= Kareldi =

Name for two Aboriginal Australian peoples

The Kareldi was a name assigned by Norman Tindale to Aboriginal Australian peoples of the state of Queensland. There were two groups that went by this name, the Garandi (Karandi), after the Garandi language, and the Gkuthaarn (Kutanda, Kuthant, Kotanda), after the Gkuthaarn language. It is not clear if they constituted a single people, but it appears that there were two dialects in the same area.

In addition, Tindale said that "Kotanda", sometimes used for both the Gkuthaarn and Garandi languages but also applied to the Kalibamu people, was also sometimes used for the Kareldi people.

== Country ==
The Kareldi held, in Tindale's estimation, some 1,500 square miles (3,900 km^{2}) of land, extending over the mouth of the Norman River and westwards from Normanton to the Flinders River. Their domain included Karumba and the Swinburne River. Their inland extension went as far as Milgarra, Maggieville, and Stirling.

W.E. Armit, Inspector of Native Police, had earlier written in Curr's 1886 volume that the land of the "Karrandee tribe" commenced at the mouth of the River Bryce, passed the mouth of the Norman River, and continued along the coast to a saltwater creek within 15 miles (24 km) of the Gilbert, and extended inland as far as Magowra Station and Walker's Creek, comprising around 2,000 square miles (5,200 km^{2}).

=== Frontier wars ===
When European settlers moved into the Gulf of Carpentaria region and established Normanton in the 1870s, there were an estimated seven Aboriginal peoples in the area, and the frontier wars blurred and confused the boundaries of traditional lands. By the 1920s, many Aboriginal people had been forcibly removed to Aboriginal reserves and missions. The Gkuthaarn and Kukatj people who remained lived in camps along the south-western side of the town, while others, such as the Kurtijar people, camped north of the Norman River.

=== Native title ===
On 29 September 2020, the Kukatj and Gkuthaarn peoples won a native title determination over more than 16,000 square kilometres (6,200 sq mi) west of the Norman River, including Normanton, as far as the Leichhardt River. Their recognition as traditional owners of the land, eight years after lodging the claim, allows the two groups to fish, hunt and practise their culture and their cultural ceremonies on pastoral land.

== Alternative names ==
- Karundi, Karunti, Kurandi, Karantee, Karrandi, Karrandee
- Gar-und-yih
- Kanin (kanin means 'scrub')
- Gooran (scrub people)
- Kotanda – a name usually used for the Kalibamu
- Kutanda
- Goothanto

== Language ==
It is not clear whether the Gkuthaarn (Kutanda) and Garandi (Karandi) were the same language, or different dialects.

=== Some words ===
According to W.E. Armit, inspector of Native Police in 1886, these were some words of the "Karrandee tribe":

- irruag (tame dog)
- nyet (father)
- mooruk (mother)
- morbuy (white man)

== Indigenous rangers ==
The Gkuthaarn Kukatj Indigenous Land & Sea Ranger group is a group of Indigenous rangers made up of Kukatj and Gkuthaarn people, help to protect the natural resources and cultural heritage of the southern Gulf of Carpentaria region. The group is managed by the Carpentaria Land Council Aboriginal Corporation.

== Sources ==
- Armit, W. E. (1886). "Mouth of the Norman" (PDF). In Curr, Edward Micklethwaite (ed.). The Australian race: its origin, languages, customs, place of landing in Australia and the routes by which it spread itself over the continent. Vol. 2. Melbourne: J. Ferres. pp. 306–309.
- Palmer, Edward (1884). "Notes on some Australian tribes". Journal of the Anthropological Institute of Great Britain and Ireland. 13: 276–347. doi:10.2307/2841896. JSTOR 2841896.
- Sharp, R. Lauriston (March 1939). "Tribes and Totemism in North-East Australia". Oceania. 9 (3). Sydney: 254–275. doi:10.1002/j.1834-4461.1939.tb00232.x. JSTOR 40327744.
- Tindale, Norman Barnett (1974). "Kareldi (QLD)". Aboriginal Tribes of Australia: Their Terrain, Environmental Controls, Distribution, Limits, and Proper Names. Australian National University Press. Archived from the original on 1 January 2018.
