= Yanga =

Yanga may refer to:

== People ==
- Yanga (singer), South African singer-songwriter
- Yanga people, an Aboriginal Australian people
- Yanga Chief, South African musician
- Gaspar Yanga, leader of a slave revolt in Spanish colonial Mexico
- Yanga R. Fernández (born 1971), astronomer at the University of Hawaii
- Yanga Govana, South African politician

== Places ==
- Yanga, Burkina Faso, a village in Burkina Faso
- Yanga, Veracruz, a settlement in Mexico founded by Gaspar Yanga
- Yanga National Park, NSW, Australia

== Sports ==
- Yanga F.C., a football club from Nyahururu, Kenya
- Young Africans S.C., nicknamed Yanga, a football club from Dar es Salaam, Tanzania

== Other ==
- Yanga (cicada) a genus of cicadas
- Yanga (composition), a 2019 orchestral composition by Gabriela Ortiz

== See also ==
- Yangga, an Aboriginal Australian people
- Yangan (disambiguation)
- Yenga (disambiguation)
