= Mbara =

Mbara may refer to:

- Mbara people, an Australian Aboriginal group
- Mbara language (Australia), an extinct Australian Aboriginal language
- Mbara language (Chad), an Afro-Asiatic language of Chad
- Augustine Mbara, Zimbabwean footballer

== See also ==
- Mbarara, a city in the Western Region of Uganda
