= Styx River (West Central Queensland) =

Styx
- Location of Styx River mouth in Queensland

Location
- Country: Australia
- State: Queensland
- Region: Central Queensland

Physical characteristics
- Source: Gilbert Range
  - location: below Mount Lookout
  - elevation: 746 m (2,448 ft)
- Mouth: confluence with the Gilbert River
  - location: below Conical Hill
  - coordinates: 19°15′01″S 143°55′18″E
  - elevation: 625 m (2,051 ft)
- Length: 24 km (15 mi)

Basin features
- National park: Blackbraes National Park

The Styx River is a river in the western portion of Central Queensland, Australia.

The headwaters of the river rise on the Gilberton Plateau in the Einasleigh Uplands, part of the Atherton Tableland in the Great Dividing Range. The river flows generally south by southwest through the Blackbraes National Park before reaching its confluence with the Gilbert River below Conical Hill. The river descends 121 metres (397 ft) over its 24-kilometre (15 mi) course.

== See also ==
- List of rivers of Australia § Queensland
