= Gkuthaarn language =

Extinct Australian Aboriginal language

Gkuthaarn
- Kuthant
- Native to: Australia
- Region: Cape York Peninsula, Queensland
- Ethnicity: Gkuthaarn
- Extinct: (date missing)
- Language family: Pama–Nyungan: Paman; Norman; Gkuthaarn
- Dialects: Garandi?

Language codes
- ISO 639-3: xut
- Glottolog: kuth1240
- AIATSIS: G31
- ELP: Kuthant

Gkuthaarn, also rendered Kuthant, Kutanda and other variant spellings, is an extinct Paman language of the Cape York Peninsula, Queensland, Australia. It also known as Karundi/Garandi (and variant spellings), but the Garandi language may be a separate dialect.

Norman Tindale also assigned the name Kareldi, but this is not confirmed by others. Current sources refer to the Gkuthaarn people.

== Alternative names ==
Tindale

- Kotanda, also spelt Kutanda, Goothanto
- Karundi, also spelt Karunti, Kurandi, Ka-rantee, Karrandi, Karrandee, Gar-und-yih, thought to be derived from Karun-/Gooran, meaning scrublands people.

However, according to Lauriston Sharp, Kotanda was also used for the now extinct Kalibamu, and Karandi/Garandi (AUSTLANG G32) was a different local group, and AIATSIS agrees.

Other variants

Other variant spellings included in AUSTLANG are:

- Karaldi
- Gudanda
- Gudhanda
- Gudhand
- Guandhar

== Phonology ==
=== Consonants ===
	Bilabial	Dental	Alveolar	Retroflex	Palatal	Velar
Plosive	p	t̪	t	(ʈ)	c	k
Nasal	m	n̪	n	ɳ	ɲ	ŋ
Fricative						ɣ
Trill			r			
Tap			ɾ	ɻ~ɽ		
Approximant	w			ɻ~ɽ	j	
Lateral			l	ɭ		

- [ʈ] is attested only in the sequence [ɳʈ] and in Kukatj loans.

=== Vowels ===
	Front		Central	Back
	Unrounded	Rounded	Central	Back
Non-low	i iː	ø øː	ɨ ɨː	u uː
Low			a aː	

- Kuthant has two diphthongs: /ia/ and /ua/.

== Some words ==
According to W.E. Armit, inspector of Native Police, these were some words of the "Karrandee tribe":

- irruag (tame dog)
- nyet (father)
- mooruk (mother)
- morbuy (white man)
