= Mitjamba =

Mitjamba may refer to:

- Mitjamba people, or Mbara, an Aboriginal Australian people
- Mitjamba language, or Mbara, an extinct language of Australia
