= Kukatja =

Kukatja, Kukatj, Kokatja or Gugadja may refer to one of several Australian Aboriginal peoples or their languages:

- Kukatj people of Queensland
  - Kukatj language
- The two dialects of the Western Desert language which have both been named 'Kukatja'.
  - The Kukatja people found near Lake Gregory in Western Australia.
  - The Kukatja people near Haasts Bluff in the Northern Territory, who are now known as 'Luritja'.
    - Luritja language

More unusually:

- Kokatha people of South Australia (Kokatja is the Yankuntjatjarra pronunciation)
  - Kokatha language
