= Flinders River =

Flinders
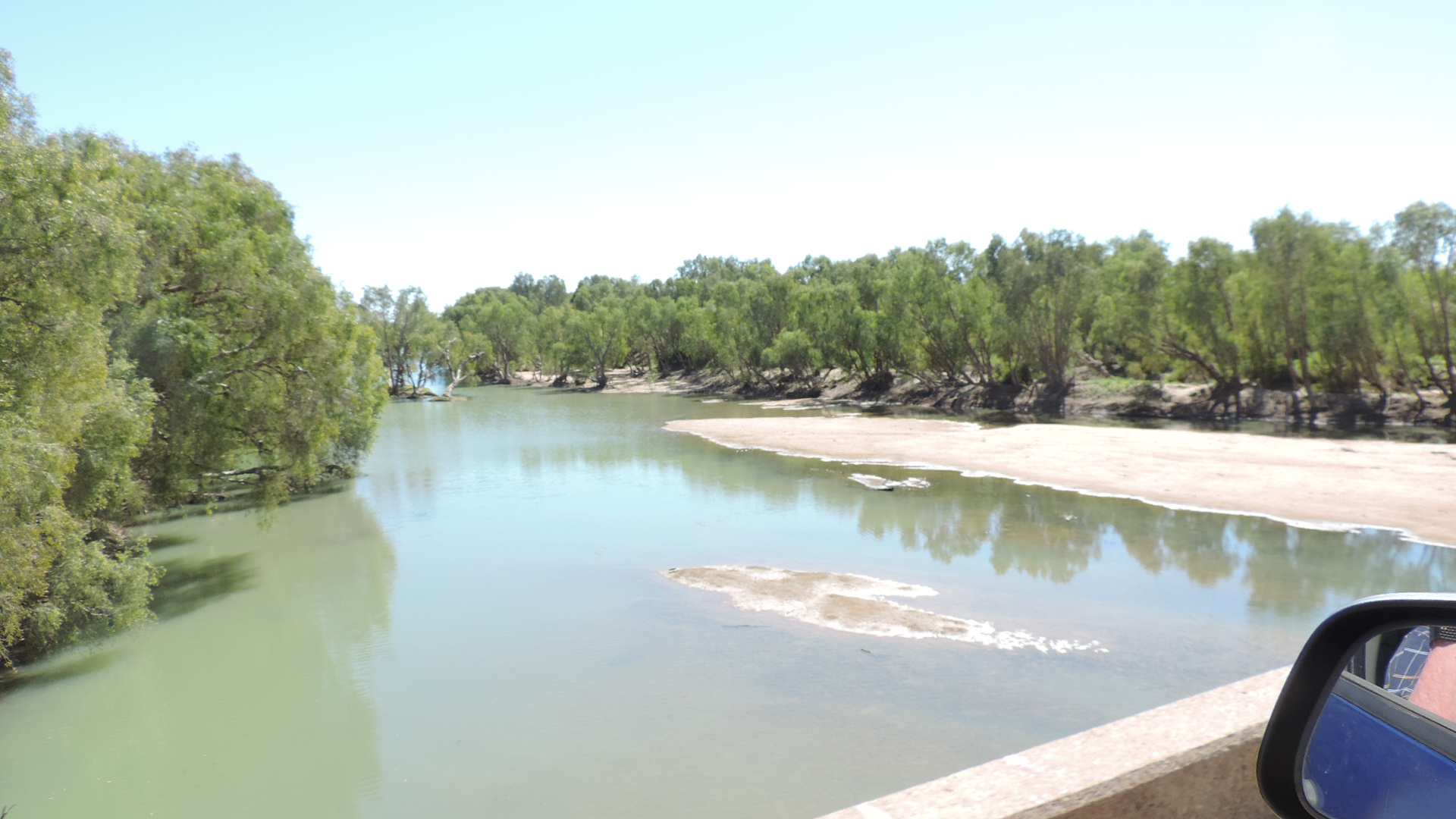
- Looking downstream along the Flinders River while crossing on the Burke Developmental Road, 2019

- Location of Flinders River mouth in Queensland
- Etymology: In honour of Matthew Flinders
- Native name: Candarace (Yirandhali language)

Location
- Country: Australia
- State: Queensland
- Region: North West Queensland, Gulf Country
- Settlements: McKinlay, Hughenden, Richmond, Julia Creek, Cloncurry, Burke and Wills Junction

Physical characteristics
- Source: Burra Range, Great Dividing Range
  - location: Reedy Springs
  - elevation: 816 m (2,677 ft)
- Mouth: Gulf of Carpentaria
  - location: west of Karumba
  - coordinates: 17°35′59″S 140°35′44″E
  - elevation: 0 m (0 ft)
- Length: 1,004 km (624 mi)
- Basin size: 109,000 km^{2} (42,000 sq mi)
- Discharge
  - average: 122.2 m^{3}/s (4,320 cu ft/s)
  - maximum: 570.2 m^{3}/s (20,140 cu ft/s)

Basin features
- Tributaries
  - left: Cloncurry River, Corella River, Bynoe River
  - right: Saxby River

The Flinders River is the longest river in Queensland, Australia, at approximately 1,004 kilometres (624 mi). It was named in honour of the explorer Matthew Flinders. The catchment is sparsely populated and mostly undeveloped. The Flinders rises on the western slopes of the Great Dividing Range in North West Queensland and flows generally north-west through the Gulf Country, across a large, flat clay pan, before entering the Gulf of Carpentaria.

== Course and features ==
The river rises in the Burra Range, part of the Great Dividing Range, 110 kilometres (68 mi) north-east of Hughenden and flows in a westerly direction past Hughenden, Richmond and Julia Creek, then north-west to the Gulf of Carpentaria 25 km (16 mi) west of Karumba. The catchment is bordered to the south by the Selwyn Range.

At 1,004 kilometres (624 mi) in length, it is the eighth-longest river in Australia. The catchment covers 109,000 square kilometres (42,000 sq mi). The primary land use in the catchment is grazing and other agriculture; the catchment covers 1.5% of the continent.

A total of 36 tributaries flow into the Flinders, the principal ones being the Cloncurry, Saxby and the Corella rivers. Another major tributary is Porcupine Creek, which has carved out a dramatic gorge located in the Porcupine Gorge National Park. While there are no dams on the Flinders River there are several on tributaries including Lake Mary Kathleen, Chinaman Creek Dam, and Corella Dam. Hughenden Irrigation Project Corporation has proposed building a diversion weir on the Flinders River downstream of Hughenden to supply a 161,000 megalitre offstream storage. Other smaller tributaries include the Range Creek, Morepork Creek, Oxley Creek, Canterbury Creek, Dutton River, Back Valley Creek, L-Tree Creek, Gorman Creek, Hazlewood Creek, Nonda Creek, Eurimpy Creek, Yambore Creek, Bynoe River and the Armstrong Creek. The river flows through one permanent waterhole, Flagstone waterhole.

Several towns are located within the catchment including: McKinlay, Burke and Wills Junction, Hughenden, Richmond, Julia Creek and Cloncurry.

The river has a mean annual discharge of 3,857 gigalitres (8.48×10^{11} imp gal; 1.02×10^{12} US gal). The maximum flow recorded is 18,000 gigalitres (3.96×10^{12} imp gal; 4.76×10^{12} US gal).

The riverbed is composed of silt with clay and sand, sand and gravel, and gravel with cobble. A large, flat clay pan is located in the area where the Flinders, Gregory and Leichhardt Rivers enter the Gulf. The mouth of the river lies in the Gulf Plains Important Bird Area.

In 2015, the population living within the catchment was 6,600.

=== Flora ===
Vegetation along the river in the upper catchment includes riparian woodlands composed of paperbarks including; Melaleuca argentea, Melaleuca bracteata and Melaleuca fluviatilis and sub-dominant eucalypts including river red gum, coolabah, with minor bauhinia. Other species found include the wattle. Infestations of weeds such as prickly acacia, Noogoora burr, rubber vine and chonky apple are also found. The understorey is dominated by a closed cover of riparian grasses including native couch on the sandy loams adjacent the stream channels.

== History ==
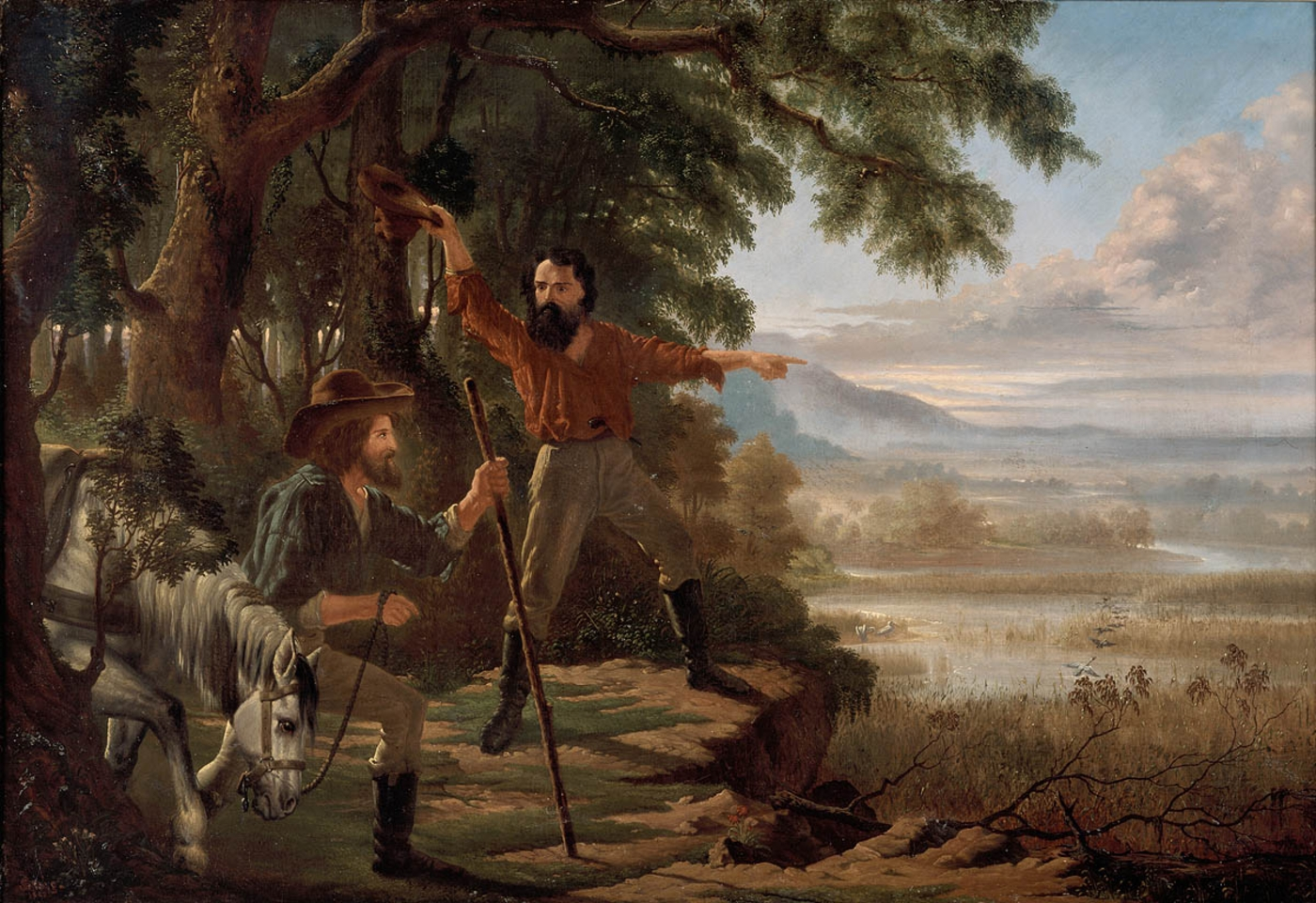
Edward Jukes Greig - Arrival of Burke & Wills at Flinders River, 1862

The traditional owners of the area are the Kalkadoon, Mitakoodi, Kukatj, Guthaarn, Mayi-Yapi, Mayi-Kulan, Mayi-Thakurti, Ngawun, Wanamara, Mbara, Yirandali and Gugu-Badhun peoples, who have inhabited the area for thousands of years.

Jirandali (also known as Yirandali, Warungu, and Yirandhali) is an Australian Aboriginal language of North-West Queensland, particularly the Hughenden area. The language region includes the local government area of the Shire of Flinders, including Dutton River, Flinders River, Mount Sturgeon, Caledonia, Richmond, Corfield, Winton, Torrens, Tower Hill, Landsborough Creek, Lammermoor, Hughenden, and Tangorin.

Wanamarra (also known as Maykulan and Wunumura) is an Australian Aboriginal language in North West Queensland. The language region includes areas within the Shire of McKinlay, Shire of Cloncurry and Shire of Richmond, including the Flinders River area, and the towns of Kynuna and Richmond.

Dalleburra (also known as Dalebura, Dal-leyburra, Yirandali) is a language of North-West Queensland, particularly Lammermoor Station via Hughenden. The Dalleburra language region includes the local government boundaries of the Flinders Shire Council.

The Flinders River was named in 1841 by Captain Wickham and Lieutenant John Lort Stokes of HMS Beagle, in honour of the explorer Matthew Flinders. Stokes charted and surveyed the estuary of the Flinders and Albert rivers, and named many other features in the area, including Disaster Inlet, Morning Inlet and the Van Diemen River.

Robert O'Hara Burke, William John Wills, Charles Gray, and John King reached the river delta in 1861, completing the goal of their expedition to cross the continent from south to north. Gray died on the journey back to Cooper Creek, and both Burke and Wills died after reaching the creek to find their depot abandoned. King survived with the help of the indigenous Yandruwandha people.

The first pastoralist to stock country along the Flinders was James Gibson who established Prairie Station in 1861. In 1864 more cattle stations were established by Gibson including Millungera and Taldora Stations.

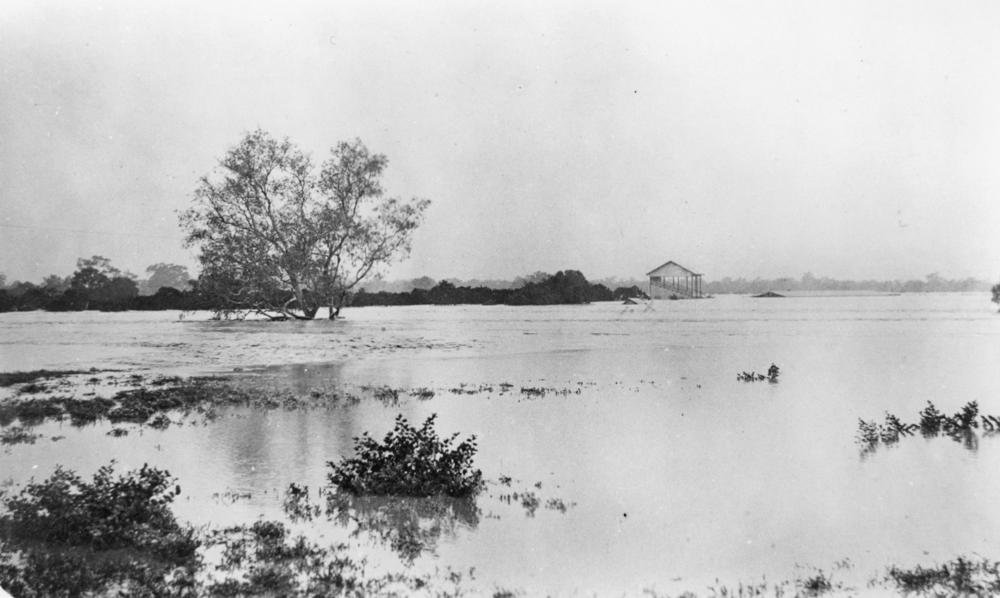
Flooding of the Flinders River at Hughenden, January 1917

Massive flooding occurred along the river in July 1870. One station lost over 4,000 sheep and roads were cut. In 1917 even larger floods were recorded, with Hughenden inundated and several people drowned. More heavy flooding occurred in 1955, 1960, 1974, 1991 and 2000.

In 2003, licences to take water from the river were first released when a pastoralist, Corbett Tritton, applied for an irrigation licence. He successfully grew crops like sorghum and cotton on his cattle station and soon other graziers were interested. A moratorium on the issuing of licences followed, but was lifted in 2013.

Heavy rainfall in Queensland in early 2019 resulted in major flooding along the Flinders, considered the worst in half a century. The broad flood plain has allowed the Flinders to stretch as wide as 60 km. The rising water also caused devastation to farmers, with heavy losses to cattle herds.

== See also ==
- List of rivers of Australia § Queensland
