= Carron River (Queensland) =

- Location of Carron River mouth in Queensland
- Etymology: In honour of William Carron

Location
- Country: Australia
- State: Queensland
- Region: Far North Queensland

Physical characteristics
- Source: Gregory Range
  - location: northeast of Croydon
  - coordinates: 17°58′S 142°30′E
  - elevation: 134 m (440 ft)
- Mouth: confluence with the Norman River
  - location: Normanton
  - coordinates: 17°42′S 141°6′E
  - elevation: 2 m (6 ft 7 in)
- Length: 255 km (158 mi)

Basin features
- River system: Norman River catchment
- Tributaries
  - left: Tabletop Creek
  - right: Telephone Creek

The Carron River is a river in Far North Queensland, Australia.

== Course and features ==
The river rises at the northern end of the Gregory Range and flows west to the north but roughly parallel with the Gulf Developmental Road until discharging into the Norman River of which it is a tributary near the town of Normanton. It flows thorough many temporary and permanent waterholes through the journey including Rope Hole.

The Carron has five tributaries including Rocky Creek, Foote Creek, Tabletop Creek, Ten Mile Creek and Telephone Creek.

The traditional owners of the area to the north of the Carron are the Walangama people and to the south are the Kurtjar people. The river is named after William Carron, second in command of the Edmund Kennedy expedition in 1848. Carron was the expedition botanist and one of the three survivors of the venture.

In 1872 the Carron and Norman Rivers were all in full flood with 14.5 inches (368 mm) of rain falling over the course of two days. Severe flooding was also experienced in 2011.

== See also ==
- List of rivers of Australia § Queensland
