= Aruba (disambiguation) =

Aruba is an island in the Caribbean Sea, that forms part of the Kingdom of the Netherlands.

Aruba may also refer to:

- Aruba (film), a 2006 Canadian film
- "Aruba" (Legends of Tomorrow), an episode of the television series Legends of Tomorrow
- Aruba Networks, a hardware and software vendor, now a subsidiary of Hewlett Packard Enterprise
- Aruba Dam, Kenya, East Africa
- Aruba S.p.A., an Italian registrar and web hosting company
- Aruba.It, motorcycle race team branding under the umbrella of Ducati Corse.
- Aruba Aubl., a synonym of the plant genus Simaba

== See also ==
- Araba (disambiguation)
- Ariba
- Arriba (disambiguation)
- Arubo
