= Ngewin (disambiguation) =

The Ngewin or Ngarnka are an indigenous people of Northern Australia.

Ngewin may also refer to:

- Ngawun, an indigenous people of Queensland
- Ngewin language

== See also ==
- Alawa people, an indigenous people of Northern Australia
