= Maikulan =

Aboriginal Australian people

The Maikulan were an indigenous Australian people of the state of Queensland. They have sometimes been confused with the Maithakari.

== Name ==
According to an earlier resident of the area, the tribal autonym referred to the native brushturkey.

== Country ==
Norman Tindale calculated that they had roughly 7,600 square miles (20,000 km^{2}) of territory, from the middle Norman, Yappar and Clara rivers northwards to Milgarra. Their eastern boundary lay near the Gregory Range, (Note: This is confused with the Gregory River by E. M. Curr in his transcription of the report by Lamond (Lamond 1886, p. 322)) while the western frontier was at Iffley and Canobie.

== History of contact ==
With the onset of white settlement, the tribe's demographic statistics suggested an original population of some 400 people. Within two decades, the numbers had been halved, with 200 remaining, as a result of what one observer stated was 'the rifle and syphilis'. A branch of the Maikulan soon shifted down the Norman River to settle around Normanton, which misled some early reports to take them to be indigenous to the latter area.

== Alternative names ==
- Maikulung, Maikolon
- Makulu
- Mygoolan, Mykoolan, Mycoolon, Micoolan, Miccoolin, Mikkoolan, Mikoolun
- Mykulau (typo)

Source: Tindale 1974, p. 180

== Some words ==
- meekoolan (white man)
- mirage (mother)
- yadoo (father)
- yalbal (wild/tame dog)

Source: Lamond 1886, p. 324

== Sources ==
- Armit, W. E. (1886). "The Mouth of the Leichardt River" (PDF). In Curr, Edward Micklethwaite (ed.). The Australian race: its origin, languages, customs, place of landing in Australia and the routes by which it spread itself over the continent. Vol. 2. Melbourne: J. Ferres. pp. 300–305.
- Howitt, Alfred William (1884). "Remarks on the Class Systems collected by Mr. Palmer". Journal of the Anthropological Institute of Great Britain and Ireland. 13: 335–347. JSTOR 2841896.
- Howitt, Alfred William (1904). The native tribes of south-east Australia (PDF). Macmillan.
- Lamond, M.S. (1886). "Between the Gregory and the Leichardt Rivers" (PDF). In Curr, Edward Micklethwaite (ed.). The Australian race: its origin, languages, customs, place of landing in Australia and the routes by which it spread itself over the continent. Vol. 2. Melbourne: J. Ferres. pp. 322–325.
- Mathews, R. H. (1898a). "Group divisions and initiation ceremonies of the Barkungee tribes". Proceedings of the Royal Society of New South Wales. 32. Sydney: 241–255. doi:10.5962/p.359301. S2CID 259756893.
- Mathews, R. H. (1898b). "Australian divisional systems". Proceedings of the Royal Society of New South Wales. 32. Sydney: 66–87. doi:10.5962/p.359289. S2CID 259614451.
- Mathews, R. H. (October–December 1900). "The Origin, Organization and Ceremonies of the Australian Aborigines". Proceedings of the American Philosophical Society. 39 (164): 556–578. JSTOR 983776.
- Palmer, Edward (1884). "Notes on some Australian tribes". Journal of the Anthropological Institute of Great Britain and Ireland. 13: 276–347. doi:10.2307/2841896. JSTOR 2841896.
- Sharp, Lauriston R. (March 1939). "Tribes and Totemism in North-East Australia". Oceania. 9 (3): 254–275. doi:10.1002/j.1834-4461.1939.tb00232.x. JSTOR 40327744.
- Tindale, Norman Barnett (1974). "Maikulan (QLD)". Aboriginal Tribes of Australia: Their Terrain, Environmental Controls, Distribution, Limits, and Proper Names. Australian National University Press.
