= Yappar River =

River in Queensland, Australia

Yappar
- Location of Yappar River mouth in Queensland

Location
- Country: Australia
- State: Queensland
- Region: Far North Queensland, Gulf Country

Physical characteristics
- Source: Gregory Range
  - location: Esmeralda
  - coordinates: 19°02′08″S 143°02′43″E
  - elevation: 391 m (1,283 ft)
- Mouth: confluence with the Norman River
  - location: Yappar Station
  - coordinates: 18°17′42″S 141°13′10″E
  - elevation: 17 m (56 ft)
- Length: 340 km (210 mi)

Basin features
- Tributaries
  - right: Esmeralda Creek

The Yappar River is a river in the Gulf Country region of Far North Queensland, Australia.

== Course and features ==
The river rises below the Gregory Range near Esmeralda in an area of ephemeral watercourses and stony sandstone ridges lightly vegetated with Eucalyptus miniata, acacia and spinifex on the ridge tops. Further down from the ridges, areas of paperbark are found. The river flows generally northwest through Esmeralda Station, floodplain and savannah county, almost parallel with the Clara River, through the channel country until it reaches Yappar Station where it reaches its confluence with the Norman River at the western boundary of Claraville. The Yappar has seven minor tributaries from source to mouth and descends 374 metres (1,227 ft) over its 340 kilometres (210 mi) course.

== See also ==
- List of rivers of Australia § Queensland
