= Ngawun language =

Extinct Australian Aboriginal language

Ngawun
- Native to: Australia
- Region: Cape York Peninsula, Queensland
- Ethnicity: Ngawun, Wanamara
- Extinct: 24 August 1977, with the death of Cherry O'Keefe (Tjapun)
- Language family: Pama–Nyungan: Mayabic; Ngawun

Language codes
- ISO 639-3: Either: nxn – Ngawun wnn – Wunumara
- Glottolog: ngaw1240 Ngawun
- AIATSIS: G17 Ngawun, G16.1 Wunumura
- ELP: Ngawun

Ngawun is an extinct Mayi language once spoken on the Cape York Peninsula of Queensland, Australia, by the Wunumara and Ngawun peoples. The last speaker of the language was Cherry O'Keefe (or Tjapun in the language) who died of pneumonia on 24 August 1977.

The etymology of the name Ngawun is unknown.

Wanamarra (also known as Maykulan and Wunumura) was spoken in North West Queensland. The language region includes areas within the Shire of McKinlay, Shire of Cloncurry and Shire of Richmond, including the Flinders River area, and the towns of Kynuna and Richmond.

== Phonology ==
=== Consonants ===
| | Peripheral | | Laminal | | Apical | |
| | Labial | Velar | Dental | Alveolo- palatal | Alveolar | Retroflex |
|---|---|---|---|---|---|---|
| Plosive | p | k | t̪ | t̠ʲ | t | ʈ |
| Nasal | m | ŋ | n̪ | n̠ʲ | n | ɳ |
| Rhotic | | | | | ɾ | |
| Lateral | | | | (l̠ʲ) | l | ɭ |
| Approximant | w | | | j | | ɻ |

- /t̪/ can be heard as fricatives [θ] in intervocalic positions, and as [ð] when in between a nasal and a vowel.
- /ɾ/ can be heard as a trill [r] when in word-final position.
- /ɭ/ can be heard as an alveolo-palatal [l̠ʲ] when before /t̠ʲ/.

=== Vowels ===
| | Front | Back |
|---|---|---|
| Close | i, iː | u, uː |
| Open | a, aː | |

- /i/ can be heard as [ɪ] when before /j/ or any other alveolo-palatal laminal sounds.
- /u/ can also be heard as [ʊ], and as [o] when in word-final positions.
