= Esmeralda Station =

Pastoral lease in Queensland

Coordinates: 18.85191°S 142.57388°E

Location in Queensland

Esmeralda Station is a pastoral lease that currently operates as a cattle station in Queensland.

It is located approximately 77 kilometres (48 mi) south east of Croydon and 120 kilometres (75 mi) south west of Georgetown. The property is mostly composed of level country fronting the Yappar, Clara Rivers and Esmeralda Creek and their tributaries.

Established at some time prior to 1884, the property was owned by De Mestre and Rowe who were trading in cattle at the time. By 1887 the property was on the market and stocked with 5,000 head of cattle and an area of 1,275 square miles (3,302 km^{2}) with two fully enclosed paddocks. In 1899 the property was owned by the Trust and Agency Company of Australasia Limited. Placed on the market for private sale in late 1902 the station occupied an area of 682 square miles (1,766 km^{2}) leasehold with 816 square miles (2,113 km^{2}) leasehold occupation licence and was stocked with 8,000 cattle and 150 horses. In 1905 the property was sold with no stock to John Hendry. By 1913 the property was owned by Frank Duncombe when he sold it for close to £12,000 to Bourke and Co. from Hughenden.

In 1934 the Esmeralda Pastoral Company placed the property up for auction. At the time the station occupied an area of 1,017 square miles (2,634 km^{2}) and stocked with 7,000 cattle.

The entire Gulf Country was ravaged by bushfires in 2013. The homestead at Esmeralda, constructed in the 1880s, was burnt to the ground during the fires during which thousands of hectares of feed was also lost. The Sheahan family owned the 3,986-square-kilometre (1,539 sq mi) property worth approximately A$40 million at the time.

== See also ==
- List of ranches and stations
