= Mbara-Yanga language =

Extinct Australian Aboriginal language

Mbara-Yanga
- Midjamba, Jangaa
- Native to: Australia
- Region: Queensland
- Ethnicity: Mbara, Yanga
- Extinct: 1960s
- Language family: Pama–Nyungan: Southern Paman; Mbara-Yanga
- Dialects: Mbara, Yanga

Language codes
- ISO 639-3: mvl
- Glottolog: mbar1261 yang1308
- AIATSIS: G21 Mbara, Y131 Yanga

Mbara (also known as Midjamba, Mitjamba, Ambara, Balgalu, or Bargal), and Yanga (also known as Jangaa, Janggal, Janga, Yangaa, Purkaburra) are mutually intelligible but separate Aboriginal language of Queensland, both now extinct. Glottolog assigns a code to a group level as Mbara-Yanga (mbar1254). Yanga is not to be confused with the Yangga language, a dialect of Biri.

The Mbara and Yanga people were traditionally neighbours, along with the Gugu-Badhun, Yirandali, Wunumara and Ngawun peoples. The expansion of cattle farming and gold rushes in the second half of the nineteenth century affected the habitat of these groups.

According to AUSTLANG, Yanga may be the same as Nyangga language and Ganggalida.

== Phonology ==
The following is of the Mbara dialect:

=== Consonants ===
	Labial	Dental	Alveolar	Palatal	Retroflex	Velar
Plosive	p	t̪	t	c		k
Nasal	m	n̪	n	ɲ		ŋ
Fricative		(ð)	z̻			
Trill			r			
Lateral			l			
Approximant	w			j	ɻ	

- /z̻/ is a rare sound.
- [ð] is either a rare sound or a possible allophone of /z̻/.

=== Vowels ===
	Front	Central	Back
High	i		u
Mid	e		o
Low		a	

- Vowel length is also distributed.
