= Goodenia minutiflora =

Scientific classification
- Kingdom: Plantae
- Clade: Tracheophytes
- Clade: Angiosperms
- Clade: Eudicots
- Clade: Asterids
- Order: Asterales
- Family: Goodeniaceae
- Genus: Goodenia
- Species: G. minutiflora

Binomial name
- Goodenia minutiflora F.Muell.

Species of plant

Goodenia minutiflora is a species of flowering plant in the family Goodeniaceae and is endemic to northern Australia. It is an annual herb with linear to lance-shaped leaves, and loose groups of tiny white or purplish flowers.

== Description ==
Goodenia minutiflora is an annual herb that typically grows to a height of up to 20 cm (7.9 in) and has adventitious roots. The leaves are mostly arranged at the base of the plant, linear to lance-shaped with the narrower end towards the base, 25–100 mm (0.98–3.94 in) long and 2–5 mm (0.079–0.197 in) wide. The flowers are arranged in loose groups up to 150 mm (5.9 in) long near the ends of the stems on peduncles 4–10 mm (0.16–0.39 in) long. Each flower is on a pedicel 5–7 mm (0.20–0.28 in) long with linear bracts up to 15 mm (0.59 in) long and bracteoles up to 1.5 mm (0.059 in) long. The sepals are lance-shaped, about 1 mm (0.039 in) long, the corolla white to purplish, 2–3 mm (0.079–0.118 in) long. The lower lobes of the corolla are about 0.5 mm (0.020 in) long with wings absent or very narrow. Flowering mainly occurs from March to May and the fruit is a more or less spherical capsule about 3 mm (0.12 in) in diameter.

== Taxonomy and naming ==
Goodenia minutiflora was first formally described in 1874 by Ferdinand von Mueller in Fragmenta Phytographiae Australiae from specimens collected by Thomas Gulliver between the Norman and Gilbert Rivers in Queensland. The specific epithet (minutiflora) means "very small-flowered".

== Distribution and habitat ==
This goodenia mainly grows on the southern shores of the Gulf of Carpentaria in Queensland and the Northern Territory.

== Conservation status ==
Goodenia minutiflora is classified as of "least concern" under the Queensland Government Nature Conservation Act 1992 and as "data deficient" under the Northern Territory Government Territory Parks and Wildlife Conservation Act 1976.
