= GGD =

GGD may refer to:

- Generalized Gaussian distribution
- Gugadj language, spoken in Australia
- Goo Goo Dolls, an American rock band
- Municipal Health Service (GGD), decentralized public health agencies in the Netherlands
