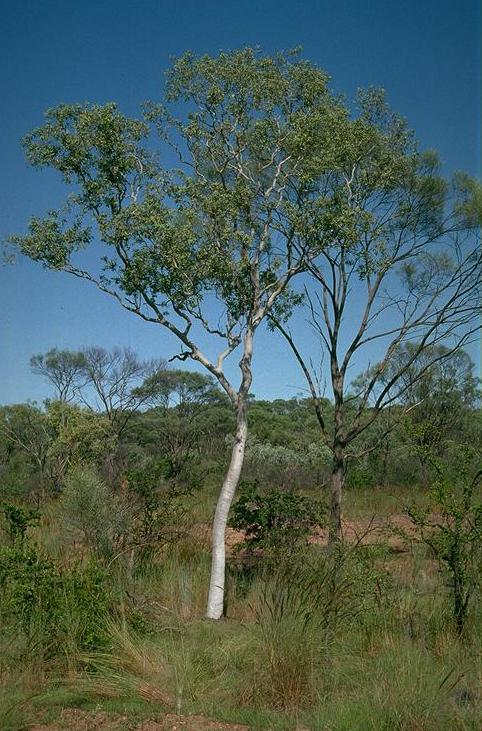
- Corymbia gilbertensis west of the Gilbert River

Scientific classification
- Kingdom: Plantae
- Clade: Embryophytes
- Clade: Tracheophytes
- Clade: Spermatophytes
- Clade: Angiosperms
- Clade: Eudicots
- Clade: Rosids
- Order: Myrtales
- Family: Myrtaceae
- Genus: Corymbia
- Species: C. gilbertensis

Binomial name
- Corymbia gilbertensis (Maiden & Blakely) K.D.Hill & L.A.S.Johnson

Synonyms
- Eucalyptus clavigera var. gilbertensis Maiden & Blakely; Eucalyptus gilbertensis (Maiden & Blakely) S.T.Blake

= Corymbia gilbertensis =

Gilbert River ghost gum

Species of plant

Corymbia gilbertensis, commonly known as Gilbert River ghost gum or Gilbert River box, is a species of tree that is endemic to tropical far north Queensland. It has rough, tessellated bark on the lower part of the trunk, smooth bark above, a crown of juvenile, intermediate and adult leaves, flower buds mostly in groups of seven, creamy white flowers and cup-shaped to barrel-shaped fruit.

== Description ==
Corymbia gilbertensis is a tree that typically grows to a height 10–12 m (33–39 ft) and forms a lignotuber. There is up to 1 m (3 ft 3 in) of rough, tessellated grey bark at the base of the trunk, smooth white to coppery or pale grey bark that is shed in small polygonal flakes or short ribbons above. Young plants and coppice regrowth have green to greyish green, egg-shaped to elliptical leaves that are 50–135 mm (2.0–5.3 in) long and 25–53 mm (0.98–2.09 in) wide on a petiole 3–10 mm (0.12–0.39 in) long. The crown of the tree has a mixture of juvenile, intermediate and adult leaves. The leaves are the same shade of green on both sides, dull or glossy, 50–130 mm (2.0–5.1 in) long and 7–46 mm (0.28–1.81 in) wide on a petiole 3–16 mm (0.12–0.63 in) long. The flower buds are arranged in leaf axils on a branched peduncle 1–7 mm (0.039–0.276 in) long, each branch of the peduncle usually with seven buds on pedicels 2–11 mm (0.079–0.433 in) long. Mature buds are pear-shaped, 5–7 mm (0.20–0.28 in) long and 4–5 mm (0.16–0.20 in) wide with a rounded operculum. The flowers are creamy white and the fruit is a woody cup-shaped to barrel-shaped capsule 5–10 mm (0.20–0.39 in) long and 5–8 mm (0.20–0.31 in) wide with the valves enclosed in the fruit.

== Taxonomy and naming ==
The Gilbert River ghost gum was first formally described in 1928 by Joseph Maiden and William Blakely in Maiden's book A Critical Revision of the Genus Eucalyptus and was given the name Eucalyptus clavigera var. gilbertensis. The type specimens were collected near the Gilbert River by Cyril Tenison White in 1922. In 1995 Ken Hill and Lawrie Johnson raised the variety to species status as Corymbia gilbertensis. The specific epithet is a reference to the type location.

== Distribution and habitat ==
Corymbia gilbertensis grows on stony ridges and hills in woodland in isolated populations in tropical north Queensland in the Croydon and Einasleigh River districts and north of Hughenden.

== Conservation status ==
This eucalypt is classified as of "least concern" under the Queensland Government Nature Conservation Act 1992.

== See also ==
- List of Corymbia species
