= Yanga people =

Aboriginal Australian people of northern Queensland

The Yanga people, also spelt Jangaa, Janggal, Janga, and Yangaa, are an Aboriginal Australian people of the state of Queensland. They may be the same as the Yukulta / Ganggalida / Nyangga group. They are not to be confused with the Yangga.

== Country ==
According to Norman Tindale, the Yanga occupied about 9,800 square kilometres (3,800 mi^{2}) of territory. Their western limits were at Glenora. Starting from the headwaters of the Gilbert River, these lands extended south of Forsayth as far as Gilberton and the Gregory Range. Their eastern boundary lay near Oak Park, Percyville, and the headwaters of the Copperfield River.

== Language ==
The Yanga people spoke the Yanga language, which is mutually intelligible with Mbara. Yanga may be the same as the same language as Ganggalida/Yukulta.

== Social organisation ==
According to Tindale, the Yanga were divided into kin groups, of which one at least is known:

- Purkaburra, resident at Percyville

== Alternative names ==
- Purkaburra

== Sources ==
- "AIATSIS map of Indigenous Australia". AIATSIS. 14 May 2024.
- Dutton, H.S. (22 March 1904a). "Aboriginal place names". Science of Man. 7 (2). Sydney: 24–27.
- Dutton, H.S. (27 June 1904b). "Aboriginal place names (Queensland)". Science of Man. 7 (5). Sydney: 72–77.
- Tindale, Norman Barnett (1974). "Jangaa (QLD)". Aboriginal Tribes of Australia: Their Terrain, Environmental Controls, Distribution, Limits, and Proper Names. Australian National University Press. ISBN 978-0-708-10741-6. Archived from the original on 19 January 2018.
