= Sahara (1983 film) =

Film by Andrew McLaglen

- Theatrical release poster by Drew Struzan
- Directed by: Andrew McLaglen
- Screenplay by: James R. Silke
- Story by: Menahem Golan
- Produced by: Menahem Golan; Yoram Globus
- Starring: Brooke Shields; Lambert Wilson; Horst Buchholz; John Rhys-Davies; Ronald Lacey; John Mills; Steve Forrest
- Cinematography: David Gurfinkel; Armando Nannuzzi
- Edited by: Michael John Bateman; Michael J. Duthie
- Music by: Ennio Morricone
- Production companies: Metro-Goldwyn-Mayer; Golan-Globus; Cannon Group
- Distributed by: Anglo-EMI Distributors (United Kingdom); MGM/UA Entertainment Co. (United States)
- Release dates: December 2, 1983 (United Kingdom); March 2, 1984 (United States)
- Running time: 111 minutes
- Countries: United States; United Kingdom
- Language: English
- Budget: $25 million or $12 million
- Box office: $1,402,962

Sahara is a 1983 adventure drama film directed by Andrew McLaglen and starring Brooke Shields, Lambert Wilson, Horst Buchholz, John Rhys-Davies and John Mills. The original music score was composed by Ennio Morricone.

== Plot ==
In 1928, R. J. Gordon dies in a practice run before he can drive his new race car in the Trans-African Auto Race through the Sahara Desert. To save her father's dream, and win the prize money, Gordon's beautiful daughter, Dale, makes plans to drive his car. To this end, Dale disguises herself as a man and, with the help of her father’s friends, takes his place in the race.

Dale is an excellent driver and has a high likelihood of winning the male-only race. Soon after crossing the start line, Dale discards her hat and mustache, thus revealing to the other racers that she is a woman. While taking a shortcut, she comes close to a tribal war between Bedouin factions. Another racer, the German Henrich Von Glessing, also takes the same shortcut in order to supply weapons to the evil leader of the two warring tribes.

Dale and her crew are captured by Rasoul, the uncle of Sheikh Ahmed Al Jaffar, the good leader of the warring tribes. Jaffar had seen Dale from afar and desired her, so he rescues her from Rasoul by claiming Dale as his bride. Dale marries Jaffar and escapes the next morning in her car to attempt to finish the race. She is captured by tribal leader Lord Beg before she can complete the race, but a stowaway Gypsy child runs back to Jaffar to tell him of Dale's capture. Meanwhile, Dale is thrown into a pit of leopards. Jaffar rallies his men, rescues her and allows her to return to drive in the race. Dale wins the race, and while celebrating, sees Jaffar's horse nearby. She bids farewell to her crew, mounts the horse, and returns to Jaffar.

== Cast ==
- Brooke Shields as Dale Gordon
- Lambert Wilson as Sheikh Ahmed Al Jaffar
- Horst Buchholz as Heinrich Von Glessing
- John Rhys-Davies as Rasoul
- John Mills as Cambridge
- Ronald Lacey as Beg
- Cliff Potts as String
- Perry Lang as Andy
- Terrence Hardiman as Captain Brownie
- Steve Forrest as R. J. Gordon
- Tuvia Tavi as Enrico Bertocelli
- David Lodge as Ewing
- Paul Maxwell as Chase
- Yosef Shiloach as Halef
- Gene Barry as Dale's Father (uncredited)

== Production ==
=== Development ===
The film was supposedly inspired by the then British Prime Minister Margaret Thatcher's son, Mark Thatcher, who became lost in North Africa in 1982 during an auto rally. It also came about due to the box office success of Raiders of the Lost Ark and Menahem Golan's fondness for the Rudolph Valentino film The Sheik (1921).

In May 1982, it was announced Guy Hamilton would direct Brooke Shields in Sahara with a $15 million budget. It was one of the biggest budgeted films from Cannon Films. Shields' fee was reportedly $1 million or $1.5 million. Her mother Teri Shields was executive producer with a fee of $25,000. Teri Shields said she wanted the film "to be cute and light and I wanted a fatherly director, who would play with her, smack her around, have fun. I don’t want anyone looking at her like a woman yet. It’s not time.” There were reportedly eight rewrites at the behest of Shields' mother and two directors quit before filming started.

Finding the male lead took over a year. “I wanted someone as handsome as could be with an unusual accent,” said Teri. Among those considered were Ted McGinley (“I darkened his hair and had him grow a beard, but he couldn’t get the accent” said Teri); Adnan Khashoggi's son Khaled (“He is a gorgeous boy, but he’s not an actor”); and John F. Kennedy Jr. (“He’s dark, handsome as hell and what a physique, but can you imagine the press if he co-starred with Brooke? The film would get lost. Besides, I didn’t think his mother would let him”). Vincent Spano, who had played a character called The Sheik in Baby It's You said he was offered the role but turned it down. "I wondered if it would be good for my career to play another sheik," he said. "Also, didn't want to be standing around in the Sahara Desert waiting for Brooke to fix her eyelashes." Eventually Lambert Wilson got the role. "Brooke is the most beautiful creature on earth," said Golan. "She is the genie of the desert and Lambert is a wildman, but educated. He wants to rape her, but he controls himself. We are not afraid here of clichés. I want a beautiful romantic blockbuster where all American kids will identify.”

=== Shooting ===
Filming began in August with Andrew McLaglen as director. Sahara was partially filmed in the Arava Desert of southern Israel near the city of Eilat. The fashions were designed by Valentino, who said 1925 was one of his favorite years: "It was a fantastic moment, full of fantasy and ideas. A time when women changed for tea, and then for dinner and then for a ball."

Shields later said, "It was fun being in Israel for four months and driving a car." She was injured during filming when she was thrown from a car she was driving, landing on her back and bruising her ribs. She stated that this incident was the closest she'd ever come to death. Filming ended in February 1983, after which Shields enrolled in Princeton University. "It was enjoyable to be in the Negev Desert and in Eilat and sort of in the Dead Sea, but the experience of it and living there for that long was definitely more memorable than the movie itself was," said Shields.

== Reception ==
The film was meant to come out in December 1983. The release was delayed until February 1984. "We couldn't get the theatres we wanted at Christmas so the decision was to wait," said an MGM/UA spokesman. Other reports said the decision to push back a release were made after poor previews. It was released only in the West Coast states. "We decided to open it in half the country to see what we had," said MGM. It made $550,848 on 344 theaters on the West Coast - a per screen average of only $1,601. The Chicago Tribune called the film "a dog". It ended up making $1.2 million.

One of the cars made for the film, a replica 1932 Hispano-Suiza H6C, was put up for auction in 2015.

=== Accolades ===
At the 5th Golden Raspberry Awards, Brooke Shields was nominated for Worst Actress and won Worst Supporting Actor as "Brooke Shields (with a moustache)", making her the first and only actress to win this award.
