= Garandi language =

Extinct Australian Aboriginal language

Garandi
- Karundi, Kotanda
- Native to: Australia
- Region: Cape York Peninsula, Queensland
- Ethnicity: Gkuthaarn
- Extinct: (date missing)
- Language family: Pama–Nyungan: Paman; Southern; Karantic language?; Garandi
- Dialects: Gkuthaarn?

Language codes
- ISO 639-3: –
- AIATSIS: G32

The Garandi language, also rendered Karundi, Garandji, Karrandee and other variants, is thought to be an extinct Paman language of the Cape York Peninsula, Queensland, Australia. It also known as Kotanda and Kutanda, names which are primarily assigned to Gkuthaarn (Khutant), and some sources view it as a dialect of this language. AIATSIS (AUSTLANG) assigns a separate code to this language (G32), but it is status is "Potential data".

There is disagreement among linguists as to whether there are one or two peoples. Lynette Oates (1975) thinks that it could be related to Gugadji, but Gavan Breen says that it belongs to the Southern Paman group and is not related to Gugadji.

Norman Tindale assigned the name Kareldi to both Garandi and Gkuthaarn (Kuthant/Kutanda) speakers, but this is not confirmed by others.

== Alternative names ==
- Karrandee, Karundi, Garandji, Karindhi, Karanti, Karunti, Kurandi, Ka rantee, Karrandi, Gar und yih, Karun, Gooran
- Kotanda, Kutanda, Goothanto
- Kareldi
