= Kukatj =

Aboriginal Australian people of Queensland

The Kukatj are an Aboriginal Australian people of the Cape York Peninsula in the state of Queensland. They are to be distinguished from the Kukatja of Western Australia and the Luritja of the Northern Territory, who have also historically been known as Kukatja.

== Country ==
In Norman Tindale's estimation, the Kukatj held about 5,700 square kilometres (2,200 sq mi) of tribal land. Their eastward extension, from Inverleigh reached the Flinders River, and running northwards from the area of the Donor Hills up to the Gulf of Carpentaria.

=== Frontier wars ===
When European settlers moved into the Gulf of Carpentaria region and established Normanton in the 1870s, there were an estimated seven Aboriginal peoples in the area, and the frontier wars blurred and confused the boundaries of traditional lands. By the 1920s, many Aboriginal people had been forcibly removed to Aboriginal reserves and missions. The Gkuthaarn and Kukatj people who remained lived in camps along the south-western side of the town, while others, such as the Kurtijar people, camped north of the Norman River.

=== Native title ===
On 29 September 2020 the Kukatj and Gkuthaarn peoples won a native title determination over more than 16,000 square kilometres (6,200 sq mi) west of the Norman River, including Normanton, as far as the Leichhardt River. Their recognition as traditional owners of the land, eight years after lodging the claim, allows the two groups to hunt, hunt and practise their culture and their cultural ceremonies on pastoral land.

== Language ==
The Kukatj people spoke the Kukatj language, which is now extinct.

== Alternative names ==
- Kukatji
- Gugadji
- Konggada (language name)

== Indigenous rangers ==
The Gkuthaarn Kukatj Indigenous Land & Sea Ranger group is a group of Indigenous rangers made up of Kukatj and Gkuthaarn people, help to protect the natural resources and cultural heritage of the southern Gulf of Carpentaria region. The group is managed by the Carpentaria Land Council Aboriginal Corporation (CLCAC).

== Sources ==
- "AIATSIS map of Indigenous Australia". AIATSIS. 14 May 2024.
- Tindale, Norman Barnett (1974). "Kukatja (QLD)". Aboriginal Tribes of Australia: Their Terrain, Environmental Controls, Distribution, Limits, and Proper Names. Australian National University Press. ISBN 978-0-708-10741-6.
