= Araba =

Araba may refer to:

== Places and jurisdictions ==
- the Ancient Arab Kingdom of Hatra, a Roman-Parthian buffer state in modern Iraq
- Basque name of Álava, a province and medieval bishopric (now Latin titular see) in the autonomous Basque Country, northern Spain
- Arabah, a section of the Great Rift Valley

== Other uses ==
- Araba (album), a 1999 album by Mustafa Sandal
- Araba (carriage), a carriage (such as a cab or coach) used in Turkey and neighbouring countries; also spelled aroba
- Araba Formation, in palaeozoic geology
- Araba people, an indigenous Australian people of Queensland, Australia
- Araba language, an Australian language
- Araba (title), a chieftaincy title that may be held by a Yoruba priest of the oracle.

== See also ==
- Arava (disambiguation)
- Arraba (disambiguation)
