= Goodenia neogoodenia =

Conservation status
- Priority Four — Rare Taxa (DEC)

Scientific classification
- Kingdom: Plantae
- Clade: Tracheophytes
- Clade: Angiosperms
- Clade: Eudicots
- Clade: Asterids
- Order: Asterales
- Family: Goodeniaceae
- Genus: Goodenia
- Species: G. neogoodenia

Binomial name
- Goodenia neogoodenia Carolin

Species of plant

Goodenia neogoodenia is a species of flowering plant in the family Goodeniaceae and is endemic to the western part of Western Australia. It is a prostrate, annual herb with round to heart-shaped or rhombic leaves and racemes or spikes of small, brownish flowers.

== Description ==
Goodenia neogoodenia is a prostrate, annual herb that has stems up to 40 cm (16 in) long. It has round to heart-shaped or rhombic leaves up to 8 mm (0.31 in) in diameter with blunt teeth on the edges. The flowers are arranged in racemes or spikes up to 30 mm (1.2 in) long, with linear bracts up to 3 mm (0.12 in) long, each flower on a pedicel up to 2 mm (0.079 in) long. The sepals are linear, about 1 mm (0.039 in) long, the petals brownish and about 1 mm (0.039 in) long. The lower lobes of the corolla are less than 1 mm (0.039 in) long and lack wings. Flowering occurs around August and the fruit is an oval capsule 3–4 mm (0.12–0.16 in) long.

== Taxonomy and naming ==
This species was first formally described in 1963 by Charles Austin Gardner and Alex George who gave it the name Neogoodenia minutiflora in the Journal of the Royal Society of Western Australia. The type specimens were collected by George 10 mi (16 km) south of Mount Magnet in 1960. In 1990 Roger Charles Carolin moved it to the genus Goodenia in the journal Telopea, but since the name Goodenia minutiflora was already used for a plant named by Ferdinand von Mueller, Carolin gave it the name Goodenia neogoodenia. The specific epithet (neogoodenia) is the name of the genus in which the species was originally placed.

== Distribution and habitat ==
This goodenia grows in red loam in shallow depressions in the Carnarvon, Geraldton Sandplains, Murchison and Yalgoo biogeographic regions in the western area of Western Australia.

== Conservation status ==
Goodenia neogoodenia is classified as "Priority Four" by the Government of Western Australia Department of Parks and Wildlife, meaning that is rare or near threatened.
