= Walangama =

Aboriginal Australian people

The Walangama were an indigenous Australian people of the state of Queensland.

== Language ==
Walangama, now extinct, was one of the Paman languages. William Armit, a local police inspector writing in the 1880s, stated that Walangama differed markedly from all of the surrounding tribal languages, stating:

It is most unusual to find a language which differs so much from its neighbours and those of Australia generally as this.' (Note: 'It is most unusual to find a language which differs so much from its neighbours and those of Australia generally as this. Except in the equivalents of fish, teeth, and you, I find no words which occur in other vocabularies. The agreement in night and dark is almost the only other Australian characteristic which I observe.' (Armit & Poigndestre 1886, pp. 310–311))

Norman Tindale says that an extensive vocabulary of Walangama was collected from informants in 1938.

== Country ==
Tindale estimated their territory as comprising some 3,200 square miles (8,300 km^{2}), around Carron River and Walker Creek. Their western borders lay around Maggieville and Normanton, while to the east, their frontier was at Croydon. To their south, their confines were around the headwaters of Belmore Creek, and their northern extension ran up to Stirling along the southern side of the Gilbert River.

== People ==
The district Police Inspector William Armit, writing in 1882, wrote that they were:

bold and hostile, fine athletic fellows, of a coppery color, with curly hair, who make frequent raids on their neighbours, and murder a White man now and then when opportunity offers.

== Alternative names ==
- Karan (scrublanders)
- Wahlongman
- Wallankammer
- Wollangama
- Wollangama
- Wollongurmee

== Some words ==
- albeyarroor ('mother')
- noughtnoommer ('tame dog')
- oinger ('white man')
- uwer ('father')

Source: Armit & Poigndestre 1886, p. 312

== Sources ==
- Armit, William E.; Poigndestre, Lyndon (1886). "Middle Norman" (PDF). In Curr, Edward Micklethwaite (ed.). The Australian race: its origin, languages, customs, place of landing in Australia and the routes by which it spread itself over the continent. Vol. 2. Melbourne: J. Ferres. pp. 310–313 – via Internet Archive.
- Roth, W. E. (1897). Ethnological Studies among the North-West-Central Queensland Aborigines (PDF). Brisbane: Edmund Gregory, Government Printer – via Internet Archive.
- Tindale, Norman Barnett (1974). "Walangama (QLD)". Aboriginal Tribes of Australia: Their Terrain, Environmental Controls, Distribution, Limits, and Proper Names. Australian National University Press. ISBN 978-0-708-10741-6.
