= Maijabi =

Aboriginal Australian people

The Maijabi (Mayi-Yapi) were an indigenous Australian people of the state of Queensland.

== Country ==
According to Norman Tindale, the Maijabi held some 4,000 square miles (10,000 km^{2}) of territory centered on the area running from the Cloncurry River south to Canobie and north to Donor Hills, at Numbera or the Cowan Downs. Their eastern boundary lay on the Flinders River and the lower Saxby, while their extension west ran to the upper Dismal Creek and the Leichhardt—Alexandra Divide.

== Social organization and practices ==
The Maijabu were a non-circumcising tribe, and subincision likewise was not practised.

== History of contact ==
One early estimate of the number of Maijabi at the time of first contact was around 1,000. By 1868, they were down to 250 'souls', and by 1879 a remnant of about 80 survived. The reasons given for this were.

'the murderous onslaughts of the mounted Native Police and to venereal diseases and measles, which were introduced by the Whites, also to prostitution and infanticide, which have enormously increased.'

Edward Palmer, who had taken over their hunting grounds on the Canobie Station in 1865, in talking of Maijabi food gathering, was the first white colonialist to discover what emerged to be the widespread practice of harvesting native purslane seeds, which the Maijabi called thukouro, by gathering the plants and threshing them in an improvised stone circle.

'The stems were eaten raw and also heated in ashes, the rest of the plant being placed on the heap to wilt. Maijabi women used freshwater mussel shells to scoop up the seed that accumulated. There it was ground between stones, pressed into cakes, and cooked in hot ashes.'

== Alternative names ==
- Maippe, Myappe
- Majabi
- Miappi
- Miubbi
- Miulbi (misprint)
- Myabi

Source: Tindale 1974, p. 180

== Some words ==
- barrago (white man)
- mecum caramra (tame dog)
- moochoo (father)
- yakoro (mother)
- yamby (wild dog)

Source: Palmer 1886, p. 338

== Sources ==
- Donner, F. (1900). "Aboriginal traditions". Science of Man. 3 (7): 115–116.
- Mathews, R. H. (1899). "Aboriginal customs in North Queensland". Science of Man. 1 (12): 262–264.
- Palmer, Edward (1884). "Notes on some Australian tribes". Journal of the Anthropological Institute of Great Britain and Ireland. 13: 276–347. doi:10.2307/2841896. JSTOR 2841896.
- Palmer, Edward (1886). "The Cloncurry River" (PDF). In Curr, Edward Micklethwaite (ed.). The Australian race: its origin, languages, customs, place of landing in Australia and the routes by which it spread itself over the continent. Vol. 2. Melbourne: J. Ferres. pp. 330–339.
- Roth, W. E. (1897). Ethnological Studies among the North-West-Central Queensland Aborigines (PDF). Brisbane: Edmund Gregory, Government Printer.
- Sharp, Lauriston R. (March 1939). "Tribes and Totemism in North-East Australia". Oceania. 9 (3): 254–275. doi:10.1002/j.1834-4461.1939.tb00232.x. JSTOR 40327744.
- Tindale, Norman Barnett (1974). "Maijabi (QLD)". Aboriginal Tribes of Australia: Their Terrain, Environmental Controls, Distribution, Limits, and Proper Names. Australian National University Press.
