= Yenga (disambiguation) =

Yenga may refer to:

== Places ==
- Yenga, Central African Republic, a village in Nana-Mambéré Prefecture, Central African Republic
- Yenga, Republic of the Congo, a village in Sangha, Republic of the Congo, 01°39′50″N 014°33′26″E
- Yenga, Sierra Leone, a village in Eastern Province, Sierra Leone
- Yenga, Uganda, a village in Bundibugyo District, Uganda

== People ==
- Biselenge Yenga, footballer (soccer player) for the Swiss FC Le Mont, q.v.
- Careca Yenga, footballer (soccer player) for the French FC Mantes and JA Drancy, q.v.
- Yannick Yenga (b. 1985), Congolese footballer (soccer player)
- Yenga Yenga Junior, band member of Zaiko Langa Langa, q.v.

== See also ==
- Yanga (disambiguation)
- Ould Yenge, a town and municipality in Mauritania
