= The Marlin Coast =

The Marlin Coast is a region of the Far North Queensland coast of Australia centered on Cairns. It extends from the town of Cardwell in the south to Cooktown in the north. This coast, on the edge of the Coral Sea and the Great Barrier Reef, is famous for the blue marlin and the prized black marlin which may be caught there. The region contains the northernmost extent of tourist development along the east coast of Australia.

The Marlin Coast is also home to the Cassowary, a unique flightless bird that lives in dense shrub and rain forest in Far North Queensland.

== See also ==
- Regions of Queensland
- Tourism in Australia
