= Ngaun =

Aboriginal Australian people

The Ngaun were an indigenous Australian people of the state of Queensland.

== Country ==
Norman Tindale calculated that the Ngaun had a territorial estate extending over 9,700 square miles (25,000 km^{2}). They were present at Iffley, and extended eastwards as far as the Gregory Range and Saxby Downs. Their southwestern limits were around Julia Creek, while their northern frontier pushed up to D Doravale, and what was formerly Maikulan land.

== History of contact ==
Before contact with whites, the Ngaun appear to have presses north to take over Maikulan territory. With the advent of western colonial settlement, a good number shifted towards the area of Conclurry. The remnant which survived the disruptions caused by the setting up of pastoral stations eventually settled around Taldora and Millungera.

== Alternative names ==
- Ngaon
- Nouun
- Naungaun

== Sources ==
- Tindale, Norman Barnett (1974). "Ngaun (QLD)". Aboriginal Tribes of Australia: Their Terrain, Environmental Controls, Distribution, Limits, and Proper Names. Australian National University Press.
