= Arava =

Arava or Aravah is the Hebrew name of a section of the Great Rift Valley between the Dead Sea and the Gulf of Aqaba/Eilat in Israel and Jordan. Its Arabic name is Arabah.

Arava may also refer to:

== Places ==
- Arava, Estonia, a village in Anija Parish, Harju County, Estonia
- Arava(h) / Araba(h) Valley-related:
  - Arava Stream, an intermittent stream
  - Sea of Arava, the Dead Sea

== Other uses ==
- Arava Valley-related:
  - Arava Institute for Environmental Studies, an Israeli study programme
  - Arava Power Company, an Israeli solar energy company
  - Arava spider, a huntsman spider found in the southern Arava Valley of Israel and Jordan
  - IAI Arava, a plane manufactured by Israel Aircraft Industries
- Arava, a brand name for the antirheumatic drug leflunomide
- Arava Shahaf (born 1990), Israeli female footballer
- Aravah (Sukkot), a willow branch, one of the four species used on the Jewish holiday of Sukkot

== See also ==
- Arraba (disambiguation)
- Araba (disambiguation)
