= Mbara people =

Aboriginal Australian people

The Mbara, also known as Kumbulmara, Mitjamba, Midjamba and Kumbulara, are or were an Aboriginal Australian people of the present-day state of Queensland. They spoke the Pama–Nyungan Mbara language.

== Country ==
Norman Tindale estimated Mitjamba lands as covering some 13,000 square kilometres (5,100 sq mi), in the area of the Woolgar and Stawell rivers. Their northern limits ran to the Gregory Range and Gledswood. The western frontier was close to Saxby Downs, while their eastern boundaries were around Chudleigh Park. They were as far south as Cambridge Downs.

== Sources ==
- Tindale, Norman Barnett (1974). "Mitjamba (QLD)". Aboriginal Tribes of Australia: Their Terrain, Environmental Controls, Distribution, Limits, and Proper Names. Australian National University Press.
