= Tropical Queensland =

Coordinates: 18°00′00.00″S 143°00′00.00″E

Tropical Queensland is a region of the state of Queensland, Australia that lies north of latitude 23.5 degrees South within the tropics.

It contains far North Queensland, North Queensland, the Mackay Region, the Gulf Country in the west and parts of Central Queensland.

Except for a few major urban centres, such as Cairns, Townsville, Mackay and Mount Isa, these large tracts of land are largely undeveloped and have a low population density typical of remote, regional Australia. Much of the land is used for grazing; sugarcane is grown in the coastal areas where high rainfall occurs. Mining and tourism are the other significant industries in the region.

The region experiences cyclones mostly between the months of November and April.

== See also ==
- Regions of Queensland
