= Gurdjar language =

Australian Aboriginal language

Gurdjar
- Kurtjar
- Native to: Australia
- Region: Cape York Peninsula, Queensland
- Ethnicity: Kunggara (Kurtjar), Araba
- Extinct: after 2007
- Language family: Pama–Nyungan: Paman; Norman; Gurdjar
- Dialects: Kurtjar (Gunggara); Rip (Ngarap, Areba)

Language codes
- ISO 639-3: Either: gdj – Gurdjar aea – Areba
- Glottolog: ribg1235
- AIATSIS: G33 Kurtjar, Y107 Areba
- ELP: Kurtjar; Kunggara
- Ariba
- Kurtjar is classified as Extinct according to the UNESCO Atlas of the World's Languages in Danger

Gurdjar (Kurtjar) is a Paman language of the Cape York Peninsula, Queensland, Australia. There are two dialects, Gurdjar proper (Gunggara, Kunggara), and Rip (Ngarap, Areba). According to the UNESCO Atlas of the World's Languages in Danger, the language is classified as extinct.

== Phonology ==
=== Consonants ===
	Bilabial	Dental	Alveolar	Retroflex	Palatal	Velar
Stop	p	t̪	t		c	k
Nasal	m	n̪	n		ɲ	ŋ
Fricative	β	ð				ɣ
Trill			r			
Flap			ɾ	ɻ~ɽ		
Approximant	w		l	ɻ~ɽ	j	

=== Vowels ===
	Front		Central	Back
	unrounded	rounded	Central	Back
Non-low	i iː	ø øː	ɨ ɨː	u uː
Low			a aː	

Kurtjar also has a diphthong /ua/.
