= Gulf Plains Important Bird Area =

Important Bird Area in Queensland, Australia

Coordinates: 17°01′50″S 140°41′37″E

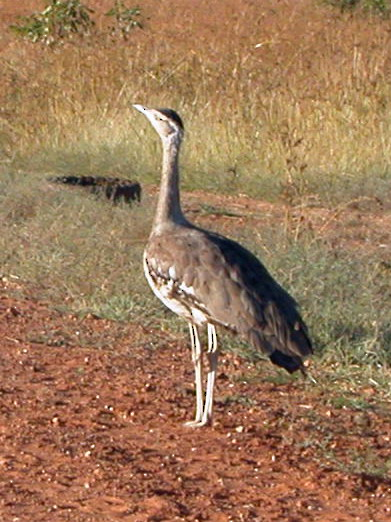
The IBA is an important site for Australian bustards

The Gulf Plains Important Bird Area comprises 8868 km^{2} of the low-lying coastal plains bordering the south-eastern corner of the Gulf of Carpentaria in north-west Queensland, Australia. It was identified by BirdLife International as an Important Bird Area (IBA) because of its importance to global populations of waders and other birds.

== Description ==
Most of the region is crown land leased for cattle grazing. There are also permanent fishing camps on the major estuaries. The IBA contains saline mudflats, grasslands, freshwater wetlands and woodlands in an area stretching along the coast from west of Burketown to north of the mouth of the Mitchell River. It is where several river systems – including the Mitchell, Gilbert, Norman, Flinders, Leichhardt and Nicholson Rivers - meet the shallow Gulf of Carpentaria.

During the wet season (December to March) much of the area is flooded when the rivers overflow their banks. The rivers are fringed with paperbark woodlands. The floodplain vegetation consists of grassy eucalypt woodlands as well as open-woodlands dominated by Eucalyptus microtheca. The freshwater grasslands are dominated by species of Dichanthium, while floodplain depressions contain Oryza grasslands that are important for birds. Along the coast, tidal inlets are fringed with mangrove forests, while the salt flats support low shrublands and patchy grasslands.

== Birds ==
The IBA supports large populations of sarus cranes and over 1% of the world populations of brolgas, Australian bustards, black-tailed godwits, great knots, eastern curlews, sharp-tailed sandpipers, lesser sand plovers, grey-tailed tattlers, little curlews, pied oystercatchers, broad-billed sandpipers, red-necked stints and black-winged stilts.
