= Walangama language =

Extinct Australian Aboriginal language

Walangama
- Native to: Australia
- Region: Cape York Peninsula, Queensland
- Ethnicity: Walangama
- Extinct: (date missing)
- Language family: Pama–Nyungan: Paman; Southern?; Walangama

Language codes
- ISO 639-3: nlw
- Glottolog: wala1263
- AIATSIS: G36

Walangama is an extinct Paman language of the Cape York Peninsula, Queensland. It may have been one of the Southern Paman languages, but is poorly attested.
