= Millungera Station =

Cattle station in Queensland, Australia

Coordinates: 19.85770°S 141.556805°E

Location in Queensland

Millungera Station is a pastoral lease that operates as a cattle station in Queensland, Australia.

== Description ==
It is located about 144 kilometres (89 mi) north east of Cloncurry and 197 kilometres (122 mi) south of Croydon in Queensland.

The station occupies an area of approximately one million acres, 1,562 square miles (4,046 km^{2}), and is the primary breeding ground for the Acton Land and Cattle Company, which is able to stock 40,000 head of cattle. The property has at least one outstation, Crowfels, which has a Santa Gertrudis stud. The station is situated in the Queensland Gulf country a generally flat tropical savannah with plains of mitchell grass. The property has some frontage along the Flinders River and is close to the Saxby River.

== History ==
The station was established in 1864 along with nearby Taldora Station by the pioneer James Gibson in 1864. Gibson had also established the first property along the Flinders River, Prairie, in 1861.

In 1880, the property was still owned by James Gibson and Company. The Melbourne Queensland Pastoral Company was set up with capital of £120,000 to purchase both Millungera and Taldora Station which had a combined area of 937,600 acres along with 20,000 head of cattle for £80,000 leaving plenty of capital left for further development, the property had been inspected by William Meredith who was to manage the station.

Meredith died in 1881 with his share of the station and stock being passed onto Salome Meredith of Brisbane.

In 1886, Millungera was owned by Meredith, Menzies and C. and the property was being managed by Mr Nutting. The homestead had been built by this stage and was described by a visitor as "the home station house a good one, built at great expense with a 12 foot verandah all around, good kitchen and stores and outbuildings with a permanent hole of water close by". Meredth's grave was also located just a short distance from the homestead.

A total area of 176,400 acres (714 km^{2}) was resumed from Millungera early in 1907 which was cut into eight separate properties in the hope of attracting immigrants to the area. Large tracts of grazing country at the station were burnt out by bushfires later the same year, other properties surrounding Millungera were similarly affected.

While some of the surrounding districts were struck by drought in 1928, Millungera was inundated by 15 inches (381 mm) of rain in 24 hours.

The herds at Millungera and surrounding properties affected by the condition known as pegleg in 1929. This condition is a phosphate deficiency and it was recommended that the cattle were provided with Nauru phosphate salts.

The station was put up for auction along with all the plant, improvements and 24,800 head of cattle in 1930. All of the pastoral holdings separate leases were listed in the sale, Millungera 735 square miles (1,904 km^{2}), Tharwan 383 square miles (992 km^{2}), Savannah Downs 354 square miles (917 km^{2}), Kuradin 293 square miles (759 km^{2}), East Creek 168 square miles (435 km^{2}) and other smaller leases. The holding, with a total area of 2,171 square miles (5,623 km^{2}), was passed in with no bids.

In 1933, an experiment was conducted to introduce Zebu cattle into the herd to make the English bred stock would give them resistance to tropical diseases and cope better with the tropical conditions. The station was still owned by Meredith Menzies Pty Ltd at this time.

In 1950, a stockman, Alan Doyle, went missing in the heavily timbered Savannah portion of the holding prompting a search party to be sent out. Doyle was the third person that had gone missing at Millungera in a period of five weeks. Doyle was found a week later after feeding himself on boiled grass and goanna.

CSR Limited auctioned off the property, which the Actons bought for A$7 million in 1985 with its 26,000 head of cattle.

== See also ==
- List of ranches and stations
- List of the largest stations in Australia
