= Arraba =

Arraba (Arabic: عرّابة) can refer to the following:

- Arraba, Israel, Israel
- Arraba, Jenin, Palestine

== Other ==
- Arabah

== See also ==
- Araba (disambiguation)
- Arriba (disambiguation)
