= Kalibamu =

Aboriginal Australian people

The Kalibamu, also known as the Kotanda, were an Aboriginal Australian people of the state of Queensland.

== Language ==
Besides the oral Kalibamu language (also known as Kukatj, although it may be a separate dialect), the Kalibamu had a sign language: puffed cheeks meant lack of water; a fist on one's forehead indicated the presence of a wallaroo; stroking one's face with splayed fingers a kangaroo, and holding the arm up and bending one's hand, that an emu was nearby.

== Country ==
The Kalibamu had an estimated (Norman Tindale) territorial range of some 1,100 square miles (2,800 km^{2}), They inhabited the coastal area running from the Leichhardt River to Morning Inlet. Their inland extension went as far as Wernadinga, Floraville, and Punchbowl.

== Social organisation ==
Male	Female	Children
Wungo	Bambi	Korgilla
Bambi	Wungoon	Koboror
Korgilla	Koboronn	Wungo
Korboron	Korgilla	Bambi

== People ==
The last survivor of the remnant of the Kalibamu died by 1963. They made damper from grass seeds called jaboola. The eating of emu meat was restricted to the aged.

== Alternative names ==
- Kotanda (also occasionally used of the Kareldi)

== Some words ==
- ngoora (tame dog)
- goombeno (wild dog)
- yabboo (father)
- younga (mother)
- mikkaloo (white man)

== Sources ==
- Tindale, Norman Barnett (1974). "Kalibamu (QLD)". Aboriginal Tribes of Australia: Their Terrain, Environmental Controls, Distribution, Limits, and Proper Names. Australian National University Press. Archived from the original on 2 January 2018.
- Middleton, T.; Noble, E. Irving (1886). "Nogoa" (PDF). In Curr, Edward Micklethwaite (ed.). The Australian race: its origin, languages, customs, place of landing in Australia and the routes by which it spread itself over the continent. Vol. 3. Melbourne: J. Ferres. pp. 90–95.
