= Arriba =

Arriba is a Spanish word meaning "up" or "above" and may refer to:

- "Ala-arriba", the motto of Póvoa de Varzim, Portugal
- Arriba!, a 1959 Spanish-language album by Caterina Valente and Silvio Francesco
- Arriba (newspaper) (1935–1979), a daily newspaper from Madrid, Spain
- "Arriba" (Babes in Toyland song), a 1990 song
- Arriba, Colorado, U.S.
- Arriba, Arriba! (2000–2003), a Filipino television show
- Arriba España (newspaper) (1936–1975), a Spanish newspaper

== See also ==
- ARIBA, Associate of the Royal Institute of British Architects
