= Robertson River =

Coordinates: 47°11′S 167°47′E

Location
- Country: New Zealand

The Robertson River is a river in Stewart Island / Rakiura, New Zealand. It rises to the east of the Tin Range and flows into the sea east of Port Pegasus.

== See also ==
- List of rivers of New Zealand
