= Gregory Range =

Mountain range in Australia

Gregory
- Location within Queensland

Highest point
- Peak: unnamed peak, in the Blackbraes National Park
- Elevation: 1,043 m (3,422 ft); AHD

Dimensions
- Length: 400 km (250 mi) east–west

Naming
- Etymology: In honour of Sir Augustus Gregory

Geography
- Country: Australia
- State: Queensland
- Region: Far North Queensland
- Rivers: Norman, Carron, Clara and Yappar
- Range coordinates: 19°00′S 143°12′E
- Parent range: Great Dividing Range

Geology
- Rock ages: Jurassic; Mesoproterozoic
- Rock types: Sandstone; Basalt and granite

The Gregory Range is a mountain range in Far North Queensland, Australia.

== Location and features ==
Part of the Great Dividing Range, the Gregory Range lies southeast of Croydon and southwest of Georgetown.

The range is located in an area of ephemeral watercourses and stony sandstone ridges lightly vegetated with Eucalyptus miniata, acacia and spinifex on the ridge tops. Further down the ridges areas of paperbark are found. The range extends approximately 400 kilometres (250 mi) in an east–west direction. The southern portion forms an undulating sandstone and basalt plateau. The sandstone is of the Jurassic age (180-160 million years) while the basalt and granite dates from the Mesoproterozoic age (1.6 - 1.0 billion years). This portion is covered in open forest of bloodwood, wattle, eucalypts and spear grass. The Stawall River flows south from the range and is a tributary of the Flinders River.

The Norman River and three of its tributaries the Carron, Clara and Yappar Rivers, also have their headwaters in the range. The flow from these rivers is westward into the Gulf of Carpentaria. The Gilbert and Robertson Rivers also have there headwaters in the range but flow northward. The highest point is in the southern half of the range with an elevation of 1,043 metres (3,422 ft) and is found within the Blackbraes National Park.

The first European to travel through the area was the explorer Augustus Charles Gregory in 1855 or 1856 as part of his expedition from Port Essington to Brisbane. The range was named by the explorer John McKinlay in 1862 while on an expedition from Adelaide in search of the lost Burke and Wills expedition.

== See also ==
- List of mountains in Queensland
