= Blackbraes National Park =

National park in Queensland, Australia

- IUCN category II (national park)
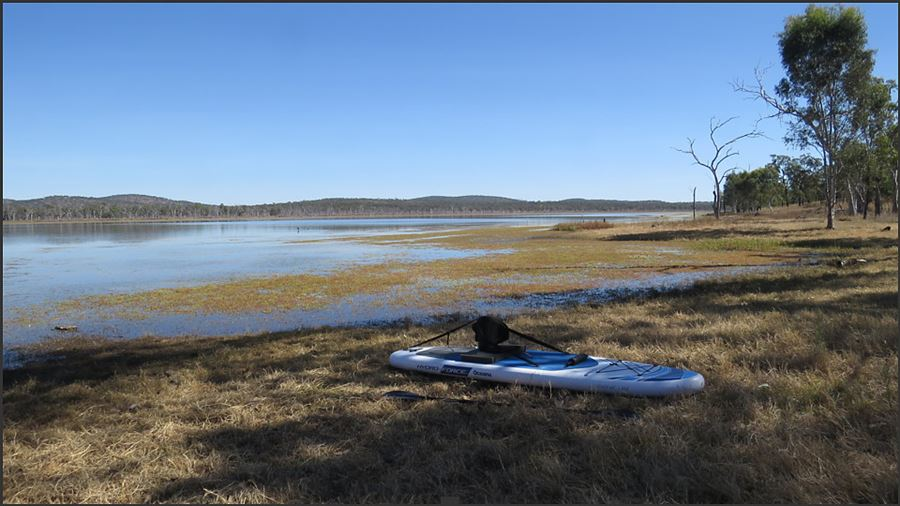
- Emu Swamp in Blackbraes National Park, 2022

- Location within Queensland
- Location: Queensland
- Coordinates: 19°28′44″S 144°10′53″E
- Area: 520 km^{2} (200 sq mi)
- Governing body: Queensland Parks and Wildlife Service

Blackbraes is a national park in Shire of Etheridge of Far North Queensland, Australia.

== Geography ==
The park is 1265 km northwest of Brisbane, 170 km north of Hughenden, and 280 km west of Townsville. Two small sections are also located in the local government areas of Shire of Flinders, considered part of North West Queensland and Charters Towers Region which is part of North Queensland. The park occupies a majority of the southern portion of Lyndhurst but also the localities of Porcupine and Basalt.

The national park includes parts of the Einasleigh Uplands and the Gulf Plains bioregions. The predominant vegetation type is ironbark woodlands, which also provides habitat for gray kangaroos, an abundance of birds and many other native animals. The highest point of the Gregory Range is found within the park. The Gilbert-Einasleigh Rivers rise in the park.

Colder and wetter climate is present in relation to the surrounding country because the park is located 900 metres above sea level.

== Amenities ==
Camping near Emu Swamp is permitted from March to November when it is mostly dry.

== See also ==
- Protected areas of Queensland
