= Yangan =

Yangan may refer to:

- Yangan, Queensland, a town in the Southern Downs Region, Queensland, Australia
  - Yangan State School, a school in Darling Downs in Yangan, Australia
- Yang'an, Shandong (杨安镇), a town in Laoling, Dezhou, Shandong, China
- Yang'an Railway (阳安铁路/陽安鐵路), a railway in Shaanxi, China
- Yang'an Manchu Ethnic Township (羊安满族乡), a township in Liaoning, China
- Yang An (born 1984), Chinese pair skater
