= Ala-arriba =

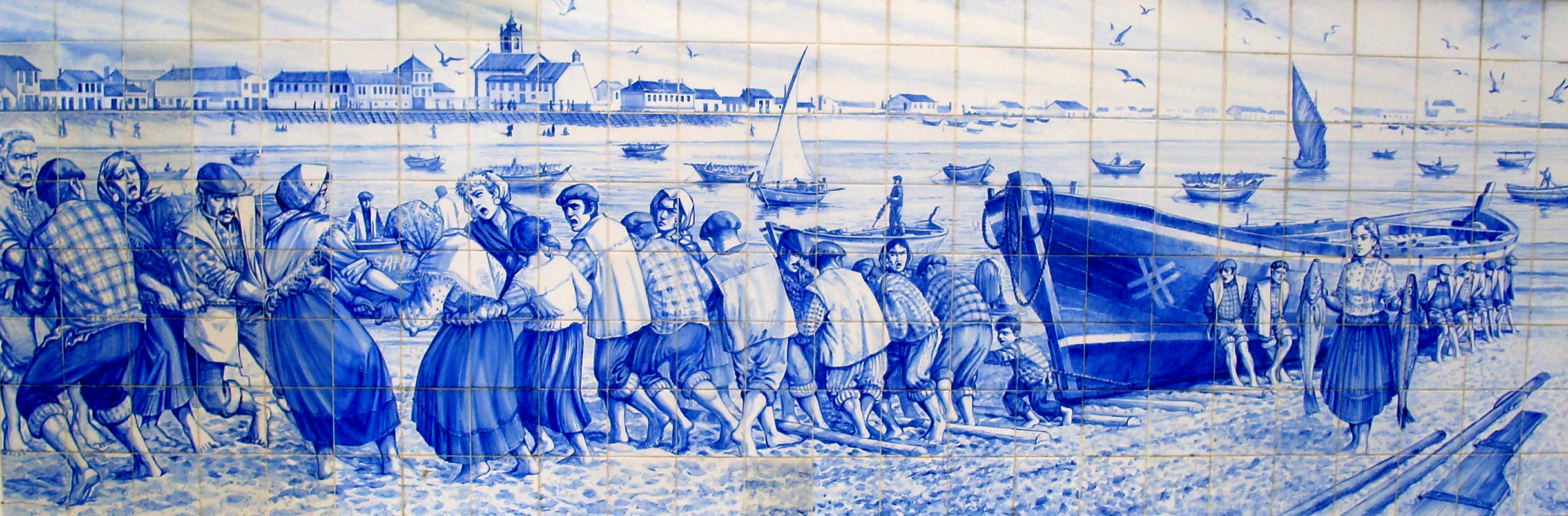
Representation of an Ala-Arriba in the old Cove of Póvoa. Even children and old people are pulling, the woman getting ownership of the fish, and Lapa Church in the background.

Ala-arriba (Portuguese pronunciation: [ɐlɐˈʁibɐ]) is an expression that means "(upwards) strength" used by the population of the Portuguese city of Póvoa de Varzim. It represents the co-operation between the inhabitants and is also the motto of Póvoa de Varzim. This expression was used when the population dragged a boat to the beach, before the harbour was built.

After the harbour of Póvoa de Varzim this practise died out. Despite that the expression continued being used to name companies, and by some politicians.

== March ==
There is also an Ala-arriba march. Lyrics by Albano Ribeiro, and music by Eduardo Correia.

note: each verse repeats twice.

Portuguese lyrics

Póvoa Terra querida
Como tu não há igual
És ainda a mais bonita
Que existe em Portugal

Ala-arriba pela Póvoa
Terra nossa bem amada
Ala-arriba pela Póvoa
Terra nossa abençoada

Póvoa Terra bendita
Nossa terra e nosso lar
Enquanto tivermos vida
Havemos de te honrar

Ala-arriba pela Póvoa
Terra nossa bem amada
Ala-arriba pela Póvoa
Terra nossa abençoada

English translation

Póvoa dear Land
Like you there is no other
You are still the most beautiful
That exists in Portugal

Ala-arriba for Póvoa
Our much-loved Land
Ala-arriba for Póvoa
Our blessed Land

Póvoa hallowed Land
Our Land and our home
While we have life
We will honour you

Ala-arriba for Póvoa
Our much-loved Land
Ala-arriba for Póvoa
Our blessed Land

== See also ==
- Mutual aid
- Bayanihan (Filipino)
- Dugnad (Norwegian)
- Gadugi (Cherokee)
- Gotong royong (Indonesia and Malaysia)
- Meitheal (Irish)
- Naffir (Sudanese Arabic)
- Talkoot (Finnish)
