= Araba people =

Indigenous Australian people of Queensland

The Araba were an indigenous Australian people of Queensland.

== Country ==
According to Norman Tindale's estimate, the Araba had some 4,000 square miles (10,000 km^{2}) of tribal land.

== Alternative names ==
- A:rap
- Aripa
- Ngariba (Walangama exonym)

== Sources ==
- Mathews, R. H. (1899). "Divisions of tribes in the Northern Territory". Journal of the Proceedings of the Royal Society of New South Wales. 33: 111–114.
- Sharp, R. Lauriston (June 1939). "Tribes and Totemism in North-East Australia (Continued)". Oceania. 9 (4): 439–461. doi:10.1002/j.1834-4461.1939.tb00248.x. JSTOR 40327762.
- Tindale, Norman Barnett (1974). "Araba (QLD)". Aboriginal Tribes of Australia: Their Terrain, Environmental Controls, Distribution, Limits, and Proper Names. Australian National University Press. ISBN 978-0-708-10741-6.
