= Yirandhali =

Aboriginal Australian people

The Yirandhali are an indigenous Australian people, who lived in the area of the present day Shire of Flinders in the state of Queensland.

== Language ==
Yirandhali may, according to Robert Dixon, belong to the Maric branch of the Pama–Nyungan language family.

According to Peter Sutton, the list of words given by an early settler, M. Armstrong, of the language of the Upper Cape River, which Norman Tindale ascribes to the Yilba, actually refers to the Yirandhali language.

== Country ==
The Yirandhali had an estimated territorial estate, according to Tindale, of around 16,000 square miles (41,000 km^{2}). The heartland of their country lay west of the Great Dividing Range, around the upper Dutton and Flinders rivers and stretched from near Mount Sturgeon southwards as far as Caledonia. Their western limits lay close to Richmond, Corfield, and the area east of Winton. The Yirandhali were the indigenous peoples of Torrens, Tower Hill, and Landsborough Creeks, of Lammermoor, Hughenden and Tangorin.

Watering on Yirandhali territory was in good part based on the resources of Towerhill Creek, which, running south, provided 12 "reaches" or watering holes: Pilmunny, Beroota, Marrikanna, Narrkooroo, Narkool, Newjenna, Turrummina, Mattamundukka, Teekalamungga, Teekaloonda, Kooroorinya and Bogunda. The wells had been dug, maintained and kept in good repair by the tribe "since time immemorial".

== Social organization ==
The Yirandhali marriage system recognized four classes:

- Ko-bro (Note: All members of this section were marked by one joint of a forefinger being excised.)
- Woonggo
- Bunberry
- Koorookill

== History of contact ==
Yirandhali lands were expropriated for running sheep and cattle, after the Scottish immigrant William Landsborough passed through their land. The main informant for the earliest period is Robert Christison, who took up an extensive tract of land for pastoral purposes between the Landsborough and Thomson rivers, and reckoned their numbers at about 300. The editor of his papers and his biographer, his daughter Mary Montgomerie Bennett, writing in 1927 states however that when Christison took up the Yirandhali lands in 1863, they numbered 500. (Note: 'Over the black-soil plains, interspersed with sand-ridges and belts of acacias and gum-trees, roamed the Dalleburra, numbering about 500, following game and the seasons.') His daughter describes his first contact in the following terms:

One day, with Gailbury, overtaking some blacks, he chose a fine-looking young fellow and rode after him, heading him back from the scrub that he was making for to the open plain. In desperation the black fellow ran up a tree. Christison dismounted and signed to him to come down, else he would cut down the tree. Thereupon the black fellow sprang to the ground and threw his arms round the horse's neck, supplicating the terrified animal that snorted and backed, broke the reins, and galloped off. Christison had a difficult task to hold the black fellow, for he was very strong, with muscle like whipcord, slippery with emu oil, and wriggled like an eel. However, he secured the black fellow and brought him home and chained him to a verandah post. He fed him, gave him a blanket, taught him to smoke, and succeeded in convincing him of his friendly intentions, while he picked up what he could of the black fellow's language and learnt the name of the tribe-Dalleburra-and of the black fellow - Ko-bro.'

In Dr. J. Beddoe's account, Christison was, uncharacteristically, for the time, much impressed by the capacities and intelligence of the people on whose lands he established his station:

Within a few years of his settlement on the lands he occupies, where he was the earliest European invader, he succeeded in establishing friendly relations with a tribe who had dwelt there, called Dalleyburra.. and by a judicious mixture of firmness, justice and kindness, established himself as their ruler. Considerable numbers of them have been employed since then, in tending herds, sheep and cattle, in sheep-washing, bark-stripping, timber- cutting, and various other occupations.

Beddoe, Christison's brother-in-law, reports from Christison that they were incentivized to work in order to obtain tobacco, consumption of which may therefore be "morally beneficial". He claims that there was also a rapid drop in their use of their native language as they adopted a variety of English, the result of mixing with the kanaka workforce which had been imported to help take on the main burden of working the station. This is contradicted by Christison's own daughter. Christison was amazed at their rapid capacity to master languages, but, his daughter adds, even after decades, they would normally converse at length only in Dalleburra, rather than the pidgin.

His daughter's account leaves little doubt that Christison greatly admired the Yirandhali, whose peaceful character, (Note: 'I have seen a camp of 300 live for three months without a quarrel-in strange contrast to the formation of a township, where, before the European popiilation reaches 50, it is necessary for the Government to send out a sergeant of police and a constable to keep order.') loyalty to their overlord, (Note: 'On an expedition into the farther west, Christison and Barney, and another black boy who went with him, nearly lost their lives, first by drought, then by flood. When the flour was nearly finished, Barney and the other black boy would not touch their share, saying that Christison stood more in need of white man's food than they did.') and humanity to the old moved him deeply. Beddoe asserted that they were unusually susceptible to the effects of thirst. (Note: 'When kindly, justly, but firmly treated, individuals become strongly attached to their white master. When accompanying him on exploring expeditions, they have been known, provisions running short, to refuse their scanity rations for successive days, rather than suffer their mnaster to want. It is noteworthy, considering the nature of the country and clinmate, that in Mr. Christison's opinion the so-called blacks are less able to bear thirst and the deprivation of water than white men, though they can go longer without solid food.' (Note: Beddoe)) Marie Bennett is skeptical of the claim, stating that her father always admired their powers of endurance under harsh conditions. With regard to the elderly, citing several cases of deep care he had had occasion to observe: a girl crippled from birth was seen, then aged 60, being born by groups of the tribe, taking turns, on a litter; another "a fragile useless old woman", was on the point of drowning, when she was saved by several men plunging into a swollen river; a mother watching over her sick child for several days while abstaining from food and drink, and refusing any consolation when it died.

== Mythology ==
According to Christison, the Yirandhali believed the landscape was also occupied by spirits (yarrabi), the most feared of which was one, Koonkoolmujja, who haunted the rocky areas. Another kind, Korribberum, would roam the downs, scrambling along on four legs, but hospitable to those whom he might encounter.

== Alternative names ==
- Yerrundulli
- Yerrunthully
- Irendely
- Dalebura, Dalleyburra
- Pooroga (language name)

== Some words ==
- kobburra (tame dog)
- koeburro (white man)
- murre (father)
- yangena (mother) (Note: Armstrong supplies marena (father), younga (mother))
- bibboo (a duelling knife, fashioned from a quartz blade in a mortised ironbark hilt and fixed with a mix of beefwood gum (tangga pandy), bees' wax (kawora) and kangaroo sinews)
- kowla (initiated male)

== Sources ==
- "AIATSIS map of Indigenous Australia". AIATSIS. 14 May 2024.
- Armstrong, M. (1886). "The Watershed and Upper Portion of the Cape River" (PDF). In Curr, Edward Micklethwaite (ed.). The Australian race: its origin, languages, customs, place of landing in Australia and the routes by which it spread itself over the continent. Vol. 2. Melbourne: J. Ferres. pp. 464–467.
- Beddoe, J. (1878). "On the Aborigines of Central Queensland". The Journal of the Anthropological Institute of Great Britain and Ireland. 7 (2): 145–148. doi:10.2307/2841381. JSTOR 2841381.
- Bennett, M. M. (July–December 1927a). "Notes on the Dalleburra Tribe of Northern Queensland". The Journal of the Anthropological Institute of Great Britain and Ireland. 57: 399–415. doi:10.2307/2843711. JSTOR 2843711.
- Bennett, Mary Montgomerie (1927b). Christison of Lammermoor. With Portraits. Alston Rivers.
- Bolton, G. C.; Gibbney, H. J. (1979). "Bennett, Mary Montgomerie (1881–1961)". Australian Dictionary of Biography. Vol. 7. Melbourne University Press.
- Christison, Robert (1887). "Upper Thomson" (PDF). In Curr, Edward Micklethwaite (ed.). The Australian race: its origin, languages, customs, place of landing in Australia and the routes by which it spread itself over the continent. Vol. 3. Melbourne: J. Ferres. pp. 10–11.
- Dixon, Robert M. W. (2002). Australian Languages: Their Nature and Development. Vol. 1. Cambridge University Press. ISBN 978-0-521-47378-1.
- Howitt, Alfred William (1904). The native tribes of south-east Australia (PDF). Macmillan. pp. 64, 227, 304, 386, 472, 709, 747, 766, 768.
- Palmer, Edward; Howitt, A. W. (1884). "Notes on some Australian tribes". The Journal of the Anthropological Institute of Great Britain and Ireland. 13: 276–334, 335–347. doi:10.2307/2841896. JSTOR 2841896.
- Sutton, Peter (November 1973). Gugu-Badshun and its neighbours: A Linguistic Salvage Study (PDF). Macquarie University M. A. honours thesis.
- Tindale, Norman Barnett (1974). "Jirandali (QLD)". Aboriginal Tribes of Australia: Their Terrain, Environmental Controls, Distribution, Limits, and Proper Names. Australian National University Press. ISBN 978-0-708-10741-6. Archived from the original on 18 January 2018.
