= Kunggara =

Aboriginal Australian people

The Kunggara, also known as Kuritjara, are an indigenous Australian people of the southern Cape York Peninsula in Queensland.

== Language ==
The Kunggara spoke Gurdjar, which had two dialects, Gunggara and Rip. Gavan Breen did a salvage study of the language, drawing on information obtained during an interview with one of the last speakers, Elsie McKillop, conducted at Bloodwood.

== Country ==
In Norman Tindale's estimation, the Kunggara's tribal territory covered some 1,900 square miles (4,900 km^{2}), centered on the Staaten River and running south to the Smithburne River and Delta Downs. The limits of their inland extension lay around Stirling and Lotus Vale.

Neighbouring tribes were the Maikulan and Maijabi.

== Alternative names ==
- Gilbert River tribe
- Gunggara
- Koonkurri
- Kuri'tjari
- Kutjar
- Ungorri

Source: Tindale 1974, p. 178

== Sources ==
- "AIATSIS map of Indigenous Australia". AIATSIS. 14 May 2024.
- Mathews, R. H. (1899). "Division of tribes in the Northern Territory". Journal and Proceedings of the Royal Society of New South Wales. 33: 111–114.
- Palmer, Edward (1884). "Notes on Some Australian Tribes". The Journal of the Anthropological Institute of Great Britain and Ireland. 13: 276–347. doi:10.2307/2841896. JSTOR 2841896.
- Palmer, Edward (1886). "The Cloncurry River" (PDF). In Curr, Edward Micklethwaite (ed.). The Australian race: its origin, languages, customs, place of landing in Australia and the routes by which it spread itself over the continent. Vol. 2. Melbourne: J. Ferres. pp. 330–335.
- Sharp, R. Lauriston (March 1939a). "Tribes and Totemism in North-East Australia". Oceania. 9 (3): 254–275. doi:10.1002/j.1834-4461.1939.tb00232.x. JSTOR 40327744.
- Sharp, R. Lauriston (June 1939b). "Tribes and Totemism in North-East Australia (Continued)". Oceania. 9 (4): 439–461. doi:10.1002/j.1834-4461.1939.tb00248.x. JSTOR 40327762.
- Tindale, Norman Barnett (1974). "Kunggara (QLD)". Aboriginal Tribes of Australia: Their Terrain, Environmental Controls, Distribution, Limits, and Proper Names. Australian National University. ISBN 978-0-708-10741-6.
