= Yangga =

Aboriginal Australian people of Queensland

The Yangga, also spelt Jangga, are an Aboriginal Australian people of the state of Queensland. They are not to be confused with the Yanga people.

== Language ==
Norman Tindale referred to the language as Jangga.

== Country ==
According to Norman Tindale's estimation, Yangga tribal lands covered roughly 4,200 square miles (11,000 km^{2}), centered on the eastern headwaters of the Suttor River. Their northern extension touched the Burdekin River, while their southern frontiers reached as far as Glenavon. The contemporary areas around Mount Coolon, Yacamunda, Mount Tindale, and Hidden Valley were all part of Yangga lands.

== Social organisation ==
The Yangga were divided into several kin groups, the name of which one at least is known:

- Durroburra (this was a northerly clan)

== Alternative names ==
- Durroburra
- Dorobura

== Sources ==
- "AIATSIS map of Indigenous Australia". AIATSIS. 28 July 2023.
- Tindale, Norman Barnett (1974). "Jangga (QLD)". Aboriginal Tribes of Australia: Their Terrain, Environmental Controls, Distribution, Limits, and Proper Names. Australian National University Press. ISBN 978-0-708-10741-6. Archived from the original on 19 January 2018.
