= Wanamara =

Aboriginal Australian people

The Wanamara (Wunumara) were an Aboriginal Australian people of the state of Queensland.

== Country ==
The Wanamara's tribal lands extended over, in Norman Tindale's calculations, some 13,000 square miles (34,000 km^{2}) from the headwaters of the Flinders River, eastwards as far as Richmond. Their western frontier was at the Williams River near Cloncurry. Their southern limits were at the Great Dividing Range and to Kynuna. They ranged north as far as Cambridge Downs and Dalgonally.

== Alternative names ==
- Wunamara
- Woonamurra, Woonomurra
- Unamara
- Oonoomurra
- ? Quippen-bura (possibly a northern horde near Richmond)

== Sources ==
- MacGillibray (1887). Curr, Edward Micklethwaite (ed.). The Australian race: its origin, languages, customs, place of landing in Australia and the routes by which it spread itself over the continent (PDF). Vol. 3. Melbourne: J. Ferres.
- Roth, W. E. (1897). Ethnological Studies among the North-West-Central Queensland Aborigines (PDF). Brisbane: Edmund Gregory, Government Printer.
- Tindale, Norman Barnett (1974). "Wanamara (QLD)". Aboriginal Tribes of Australia: Their Terrain, Environmental Controls, Distribution, Limits, and Proper Names. Australian National University Press. ISBN 978-0-708-10741-6.
