= Clara River =

Clara
- Location of Clara River mouth in Queensland

Location
- Country: Australia
- State: Queensland
- Region: North West Queensland, Gulf Country

Physical characteristics
- Source: Gregory Range
  - location: near Bellfield
  - coordinates: 19°14′40″S 143°24′04″E
  - elevation: 430 m (1,410 ft)
- Mouth: confluence with the Norman River
  - location: south of Normanton
  - coordinates: 18°27′24″S 141°18′25″E
  - elevation: 25 m (82 ft)
- Length: 385 km (239 mi)

Basin features
- River system: Norman River catchment
- Tributaries
  - right: Borer River

The Clara River is a river in the Gulf Country of northwest Queensland, Australia.

The river rises in the Gregory Range in Bellfield and flows in a westerly direction, traversing tropical savanna plains and eventually discharging into the Norman River in Claraville, south of Normanton. From source to mouth, the Clara River is joined by the Borer River, Snowy Creek and Yarraman Creek, and descends 404 metres (1,325 ft) over its 385-kilometre (239 mi) course.

The headwaters in the Gregory Range are made up of ephemeral water courses and stony ridges composed of sandstone and conglomerate. The vegetation in the area is open forest which changes to savannah and grasslands of the open floodplains. The river and stream banks support riparian vegetation dominated by red river gum and coolabah trees.

== See also ==
- List of rivers of Australia § Queensland
