= Gilbert River (Queensland) =

River in Queensland, Australia

Gilbert
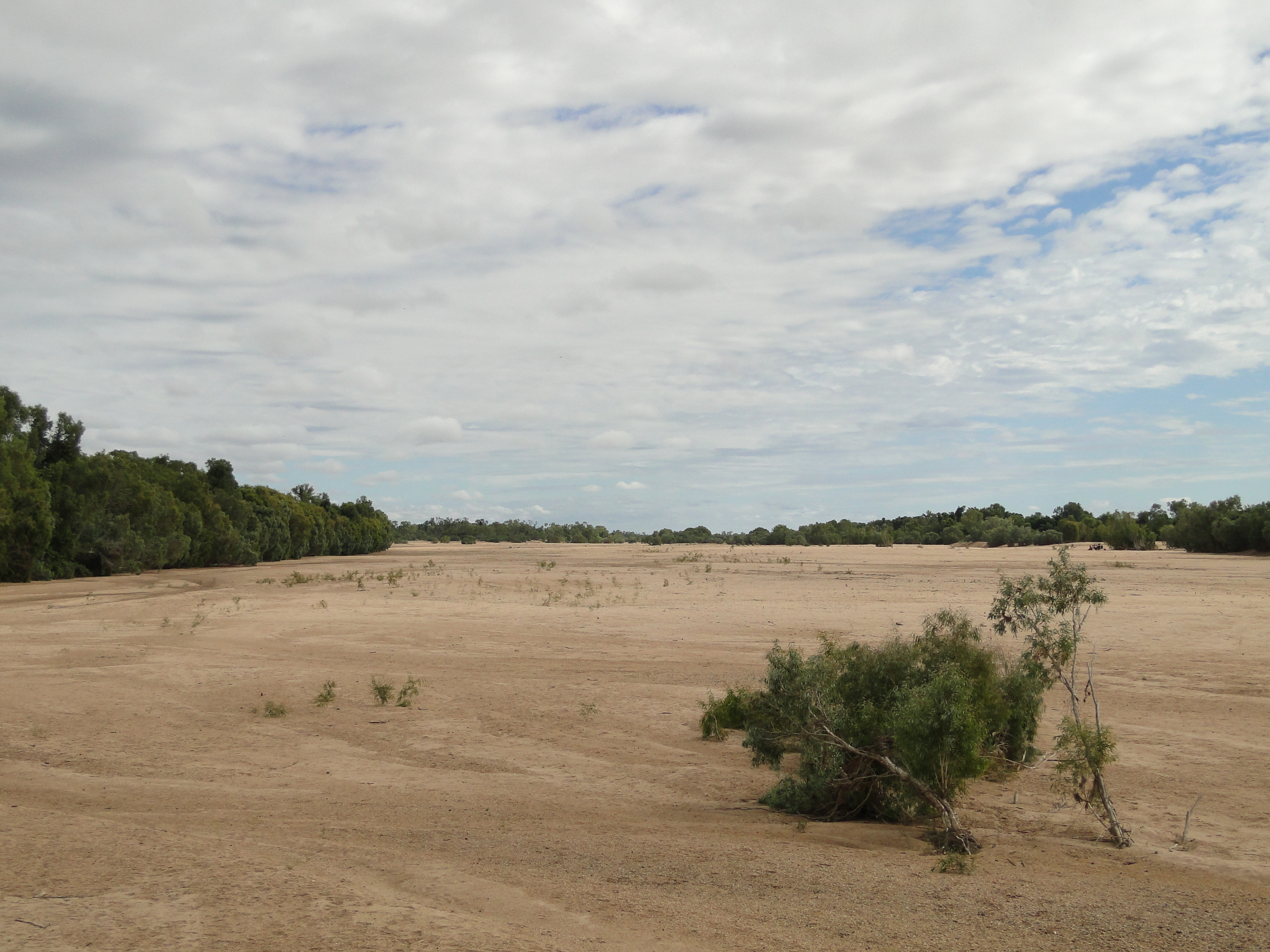
- The dry bed of the Gilbert River at the crossing on the Gulf Development Road between Croydon and Georgetown, Queensland

- Location of Gilbert River mouth in Queensland
- Etymology: In honour of John Gilbert

Location
- Country: Australia
- State: Queensland
- Region: Far North Queensland

Physical characteristics
- Source: Gregory and Newcastle Ranges, Atherton Tableland
  - location: below Conical Hill
  - elevation: 634 m (2,080 ft)
- Mouth: Gulf of Carpentaria
  - location: north of Karumba
  - coordinates: 16°32′23″S 141°16′22″E
  - elevation: 0 m (0 ft)
- Length: 887 km (551 mi)
- Basin size: 46,810 km^{2} (18,070 sq mi)
- Discharge
  - average: 280 m^{3}/s (9,900 cu ft/s)(extremely seasonal)

Basin features
- Tributaries
  - left: Langdon River, Little River (Queensland), Einasleigh River
  - right: Styx River, Percy River, Robertson River
- National park: Blackbraes National Park

The Gilbert River is located in Far North Queensland, Australia. When combined with the Einasleigh River, the river system is the largest in northern Australia.

== Features and location ==
The Gilbert River rises below Conical Hill in the Einasleigh Uplands, draining the eastern slopes of the Gregory Range and the western slopes of the Newcastle Range, north of Hughenden. The river flows generally northwest, joined by forty tributaries that drain the Blackbraes National Park including, from source to mouth, the Styx, Percy, Robertson, Langdon, Little, and Einasleigh rivers and numerous creeks. North of Karumba the Gilbert discharges into the Gulf of Carpentaria. However, northwest of Normanton an anabranch of the river forms confluence with the Smithburne River, also emptying into the Gulf. The Gilbert River has a catchment area of 22,041 square kilometres (8,510 sq mi) of which 455 square kilometres (176 sq mi), or a third of the total catchment, is a vast estuarine delta approximately 100 kilometres (62 mi) wide that largely consists of tidal flats and mangrove swamps across the Gulf Country. The river descends 635 metres (2,083 ft) over its 887-kilometre (551 mi) course.

The Gilbert River is a seasonal stream and discharge can vary greatly depending on the intensity of the monsoon. When combined with the Einasleigh River, the Gilbert River has the sixth-highest discharge of any river in Australia, slightly less than that of the Potomac in North America. In an intense wet season, however, the discharge can be as large as that of the Fraser River in Canada, and in a mild wet season like that of 1951–52, the discharge can be as little as one tenth of the long term mean. It is estimated that runoff from the combined Gilbert-Einasleigh River system totals about 2.2 percent of the total runoff from Australia. The record major flood of the Gilbert River was in January 1974 and the floods of February 1991 and in January and February 2009, caused widespread road closures and inundation of properties throughout the catchment.

== Environment ==
The climate of the basin is tropical, with annual rainfall generally around 800 millimetres (31 in). Almost all the annual rainfall occurs between December and March: the months from May to September are rainless in over 60 percent of years (over 80 percent for August). Rainfall is highly variable due to monsoon variability and occasional severe cyclones: in a wet season like 1973–74 or 1999–2000 it can exceed 1,800 millimetres (71 in), but in the almost nonexistent wet season of 1951–1952 it was as low as 300 millimetres (12 in) over much of the basin.

The river is too erratic for hydroelectricity to be viable and the soils are exceedingly infertile – generally ironstone gravels or kaolinitic clays – the combined Gilbert-Einasleigh River system is one of the relatively few completely free-flowing river systems of its size or greater in the world. Most of the basin is natural grassland used for grazing cattle at the extremely low densities permissible with the very low nutritive qualities of the feed available: the population is no more than one thousand or one person for over 40 square kilometres (15 sq mi). In the upper reaches soils are more fertile red cracking clays but erode too easily under the erratic rainfall for cropping to be a likely prospect even with groundwater available. The mouth of the river lies in the Gulf Plains Important Bird Area.

The traditional owners of the upper catchment area are the Kunjen people.

== Etymology ==
The river was named in July 1845 by Ludwig Leichhardt in honour of the naturalist John Gilbert who was killed two weeks earlier in an engagement with an Aboriginal group near the Gulf of Carpentaria coast.

== See also ==
- List of rivers of Australia § Queensland
