= Kukatj language =

Extinct Australian Aboriginal language

Kukatj
- Gugadj
- Native to: Australia
- Region: Cape York Peninsula, Queensland
- Ethnicity: Kukatj, Kalibamu
- Extinct: late 20th century
- Language family: Pama–Nyungan: Paman; Kukatj
- Dialects: Kalibamu

Language codes
- ISO 639-3: ggd
- Glottolog: guga1239
- AIATSIS: G28, G27
- ELP: Kukatj

Kukatj, also rendered Gugadj, is an extinct Paman language of the Cape York Peninsula, Queensland, Australia. The name Kalibamu has also been assigned to it, although this may be a separate dialect. It is spoken by the Kukatj people. A single speaker was last recorded in 1975.

It has also been referred to as Kukatja, but this is not to be confused with the Kukatja Western Desert Language spoken south of Balgo, Western Australia, or the Luritja dialect of the Western Desert Language, spoken in the Northern Territory also referred to as Kukatja by some.

Other synonyms for Kukatj are Marago, Gudadj, Gudadji, Gugady, Gugatj, Kokatj, Kukatji, Kukatyi, and Konggada.

== Kalibamu ==
AIATSIS assigns a separate code to Kalibamu (G27), with the synonyms Kukatj, Galimbamu, Galibamu, Golbiri, and Kotanda, although its status is listed as "unconfirmed" as of December 2024. It says that while Galibamu is reported as a separate dialect by Capell (1963) and Tindale, Breen (2006) says that Galibamu appears to be the same as what he calls Kukatj.

It was spoken by the Kalibamu people.

== Phonology ==
=== Consonants ===
		Peripheral		Laminal		Apical	
		Labial	Velar	Dental	Palatal	Alveolar	Retroflex
Plosive		p	k	t̪	c	t	(ʈ)
Nasal		m	ŋ	n̪	ɲ	n	(ɳ)
Rhotic	trill					r	
Rhotic	tap					ɾ	
Lateral						l	(ɭ)
Approximant		w			j		ɻ

- Retroflex sounds [ʈ, ɳ, ɭ] occur as a result of alveolar sounds /t, n, l/ following rhotic sounds in the following sequences /-rt-, -rn-, -rl-/.

=== Vowels ===
	Front	Central	Back
Close	i, iː		u, uː
Mid		(ə)	
Open		a, aː	

- /ə/ exists as an underlying vowel within consonant positions.
