= Norman River =

River in Queensland, Australia

Coordinates: 17°28′S 140°49′E

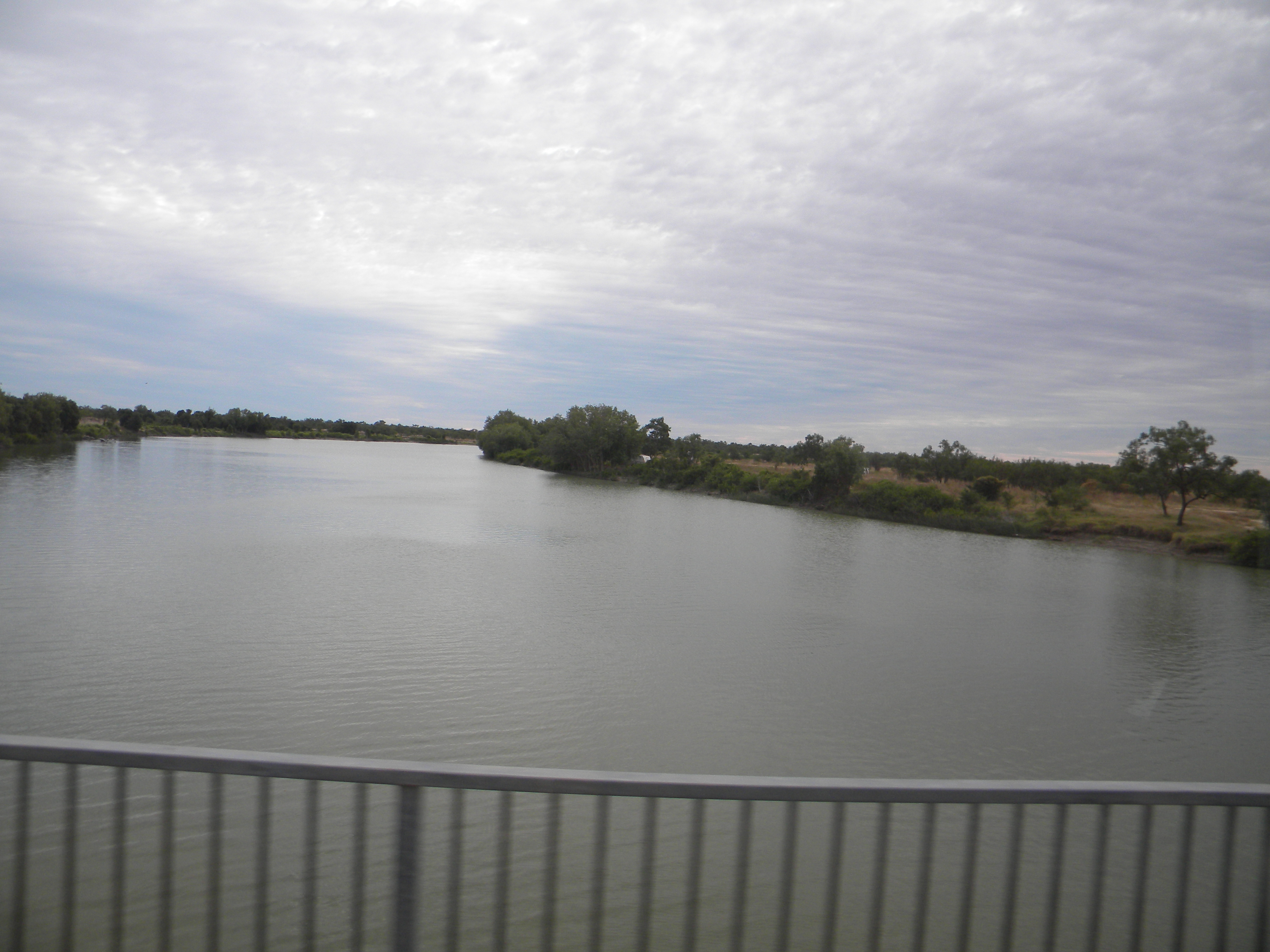
- Norman River just to the north-east of the town of Normanton, 2013

Location
- Country: Australia
- State: Queensland
- Region: North West Queensland

Physical characteristics
- Source: Gregory Range
- Mouth: Gulf of Carpentaria
  - location: Karumba
- Length: 420 km (260 mi)
- Basin size: 50,445 km^{2} (19,477 sq mi)
- Discharge
  - average: 67 m^{3}/s (2,400 cu ft/s)

The Norman River is a river in the Gulf Country, Queensland, Australia. The river originates in the Gregory Range, 200 kilometres (120 mi) southeast of Croydon and flows 420 kilometres (260 mi) northwest to the Gulf of Carpentaria. It is joined by three major tributaries, the Carron, Clara and Yappar Rivers. The river flows through Normanton before entering the Gulf of Carpentaria through the major fishing port of Karumba. The mouth of the river lies in the Gulf Plains Important Bird Area.

The record flood of the river occurred in 1974, cresting at 8.8 metres (29 ft) in Normanton and causing the inundation of the town. The river's catchment area covers 50,445 square kilometres (19,477 sq mi).

There are two water storage facilities along the river, Belmore Creek Dam and Glenore Weir, totaling 4,350 megalitres (154×10^{6} cu ft) in capacity.

== See also ==
- List of rivers of Australia
