= Saxby River =

River in Queensland, Australia

Saxby
- Location of Saxby river mouth in Queensland

Location
- Country: Australia
- State: Queensland
- Region: North West Queensland, Gulf Country

Physical characteristics
- Source
  - location: southeast of Pelham
  - elevation: 298 m (978 ft)
- Mouth: confluence with the Flinders River
  - location: Gulf Country
  - coordinates: 18°25′45″S 140°52′08″E
  - elevation: 16 m (52 ft)
- Length: 1,030 km (640 mi)

Basin features
- River system: Flinders River catchment

The Saxby River is a river in North West Queensland, Australia.

The river has a catchment area of 10,147 square kilometres (3,918 sq mi), of which an area of 139 square kilometres (54 sq mi) is composed of riverine wetlands.

== See also ==
- List of rivers of Australia § Queensland
