= Station Master's Residence, Forsayth =

- Location within Queensland Location within Australia
- 18.5864°S 143.6034°E
- Location: Fourth Street, Forsayth, Shire of Etheridge, Queensland, Australia

History
- Design period: 1900–1914 (early 20th century)
- Built: c. 1910

Queensland Heritage Register
- Official name: Station Master's Residence Forsayth (former)
- Type: state heritage (built)
- Designated: 21 October 1992
- Reference no.: 600507
- Significant period: c. 1910 (fabric) c. 1910–1920s (historical)
- Significant components: residential accommodation – station master's house/quarters, kitchen/kitchen house, fence/wall – perimeter

Station Master's Residence is a heritage-listed detached house at Fourth Street, Forsayth, Shire of Etheridge, Queensland, Australia. It was built c. 1910. It was added to the Queensland Heritage Register on 21 October 1992.

== History ==
The former Forsayth Station Master's Residence was constructed around 1910 as part of the private Etheridge railway line linking the mines and smelters of the Chillagoe Railway and Mining Company to the Queensland Government railway network. The mining company's Engineer-in-Charge, Archibald Smith Frew, designed this and two other similar residences at Almaden and at Einasleigh on the line.

The important mining entrepreneur, John Moffat, prospected for copper in the Chillagoe area from the late 1880s and in the 1890s formed a syndicate with Melbourne investors to build a private railway linking Chillagoe with the government railway network at Mareeba. The bill to approve this project was passed in Parliament in 1897 and A S Frew surveyed the line. Archibald Smith Frew was employed as an engineer by the Queensland Railways Department from 1879, was second in charge at the construction of the Croydon railway line in 1890–1891, and constructed much of the Cairns railway network in the early years of the 20th century. He also designed the structures needed to service the Chillagoe railway line. Many of the buildings, since vanished, displayed the distinctive multiple gabled roofs seen on this residence.

The Etheridge railway line was built between 1906 and 1910 and the principal towns along the line were Almaden, Einasleigh and Forsayth, which was the terminus. Forsayth was originally called Charleston, but the name was changed on 15 December 1910 to honour the Commissioner for Railways, James Forsayth Thallon. A S Frew designed Station Master's residences at each of the service towns as part of the overall provision of facilities that included a station building, cattle yards, turning fork, loading bank and goods shed.

The Station Master's houses at each town are similar in plan and all feature a distinctive roof arranged in three parallel gables, which indicate the room arrangement. The central room was a dining room flanked by pairs of bedrooms. The Einasleigh and Forsayth houses were larger than that at Almaden and were originally designed with lattice at each end of the dining room, allowing this to operate as a central breezeway. However, they may not have actually been constructed in this way and are enclosed at each end. A detached building at the rear of the house incorporated a kitchen, store and servant's room with the roof extended to the back to cover a laundry.

The Chillagoe Company experienced considerable difficulties, undergoing several financial reconstructions. Although it was not profitable, it nevertheless survived until 1923, and had an important influence on the mining and railway industries of North Queensland. There is evidence of its operations in the ruined smelter at Chillagoe, and abandoned mine sites at Mungana, Einasleigh, Mount Mulligan and elsewhere. However the railway lines built by the company from the government railhead at Mareeba to Mungana in 1901, and to Forsayth in 1910, have survived in use. When constructed, they were part of the longest privately owned railway network in Australia, but were incorporated into the Queensland Government rail system in June 1919 when most of the Chillagoe Company's assets were purchased by the Queensland Government. At this time Forsayth railway station became a Queensland Railways station. The Station Master was withdrawn after floods closed the line in early 1927. When the line reopened for rail motor traffic (hauling one or two goods wagons for freight) a Porter in Charge was appointed. This remained the position until the 1990s when the Porter was withdrawn and a local agent appointed to handle the small remaining railway business for QR. The line is now chiefly a tourist attraction running the Savannahlander from Cairns. Queensland Rail subdivided the land and sold the house as a private residence in 1991.

== Description ==
The former Station Master's Residence is a single storey timber building set on concrete stumps and has a detached kitchen. The core of the building is clad in weatherboards and has a roof comprising three parallel gables clad in corrugated iron. It is encircled by a verandah with a separate roof supported by timber posts. It has sash windows and French doors opening onto the verandah at the front and rear.

At the rear of the house is a rectangular timber building linked to it by a walkway. This building has exposed studs and a single gabled roof clad with corrugated iron. The roof is extended at the rear and supported on timber posts. A small extension has been made at the side of the building to accommodate a bathroom.

The buildings are surrounded by timber post and chain wire fence.

== Heritage listing ==
The former Station Master's Residence Forsayth was listed on the Queensland Heritage Register on 21 October 1992 having satisfied the following criteria.

The place is important in demonstrating the evolution or pattern of Queensland's history.

The former Station Master's Residence at Forsayth is one of three such residences built as part of the infrastructure servicing the private railway of a major mining company. They express the dominance of the Chillagoe Company in the economy of North Queensland, 1898–1914. The line was a vital link in the Company's operations, bringing in fuel for the smelters and taking out minerals, but it also worked as a community railway servicing the needs of those living on the line and in the service towns.

The Etheridge line is rare as a private railway and the provision of Station Master's residences demonstrates the quality and importance of the facility to the Chillagoe Company.

The place demonstrates rare, uncommon or endangered aspects of Queensland's cultural heritage.

The Etheridge line is rare as a private railway and the provision of Station Master's residences demonstrates the quality and importance of the facility to the Chillagoe Company.

The place is important because of its aesthetic significance.

The former Station Master's residence has aesthetic value as a well-executed variation of a traditional dwelling within the Queensland vernacular tradition and makes a substantial contribution to the built character of Forsayth.

The place has a special association with the life or work of a particular person, group or organisation of importance in Queensland's history.

It is important for its connection with the life and work of the prominent engineer, A S Frew, who designed both the line and the structures along it, endowing them with a personal interpretation of the established local tradition in domestic architecture.
