= Cairns railway station =

Railway station in Queensland, Australia

Cairns
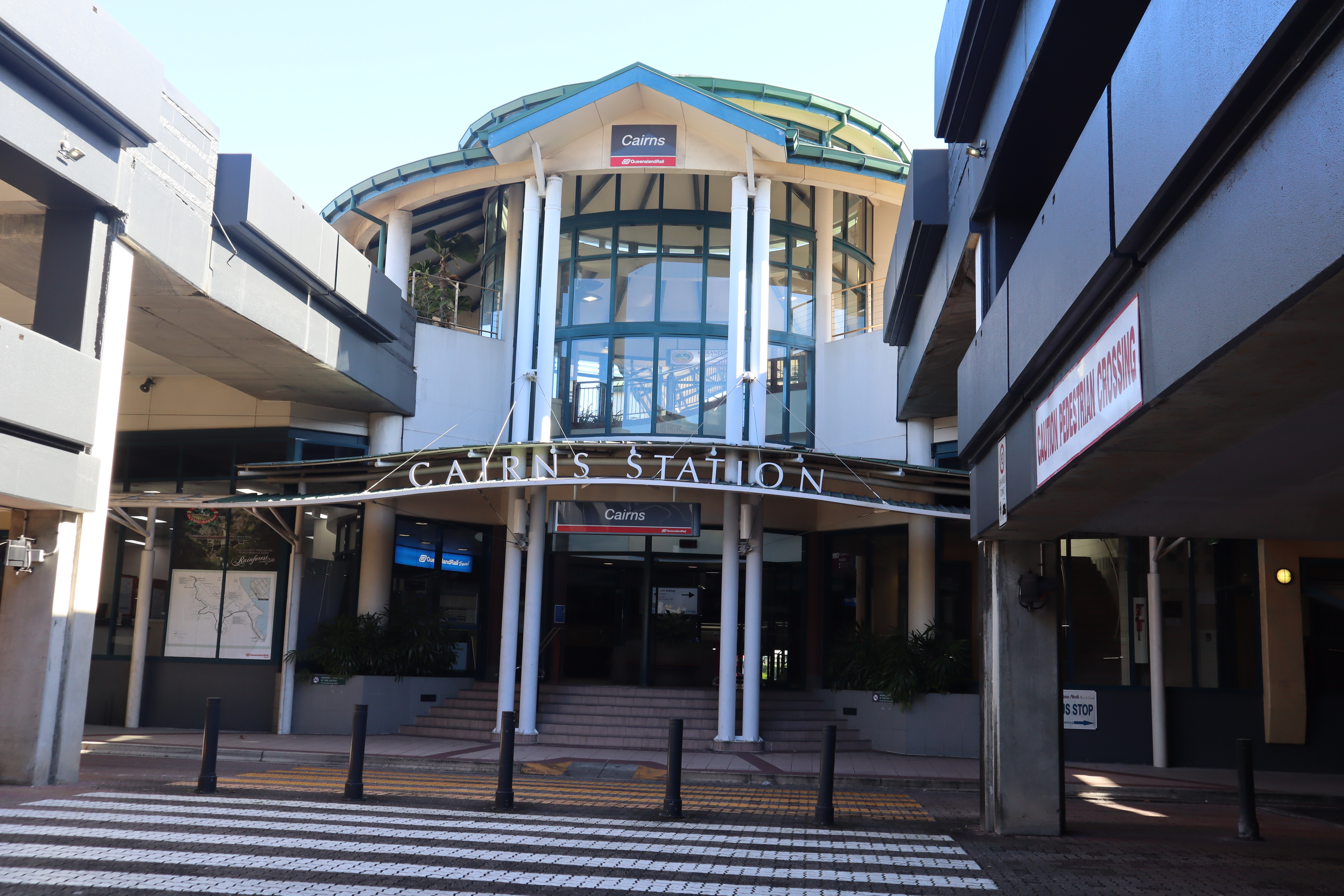
- Station Entrance in July 2021

General information
- Location: Bunda Street, Cairns
- Coordinates: 16.92528°S 145.77222°E
- Owner: Queensland Rail
- Operator: Traveltrain
- Lines: North Coast; Kuranda; Tablelands
- Distance: 1679.83 kilometres from Central
- Platforms: 2 side
- Tracks: 2

Construction
- Structure type: Ground
- Accessible: Yes

History
- Rebuilt: 7 May 1996

Services
Preceding station	Queensland Rail	Following station
Gordonvale towards Brisbane	Spirit of Queensland	Terminus
Terminus	Kuranda Scenic Railway	Freshwater towards Kuranda
Terminus	Savannahlander	Barron Falls towards Forsayth
Location
- Location within Queensland

Cairns railway station is a railway station in the Cairns CBD in the Cairns Region, Queensland, Australia, serving the city of Cairns. The station is the terminus of the North Coast railway line from Brisbane and the terminus for the Tablelands railway line to the Atherton Tableland. Two tourist railway services operate from here: the Kuranda Scenic Railway and the Savannahlander. The station has two platforms. It is integrated with the Cairns Central Shopping Centre, with the platforms being built underneath parking areas.

== History ==
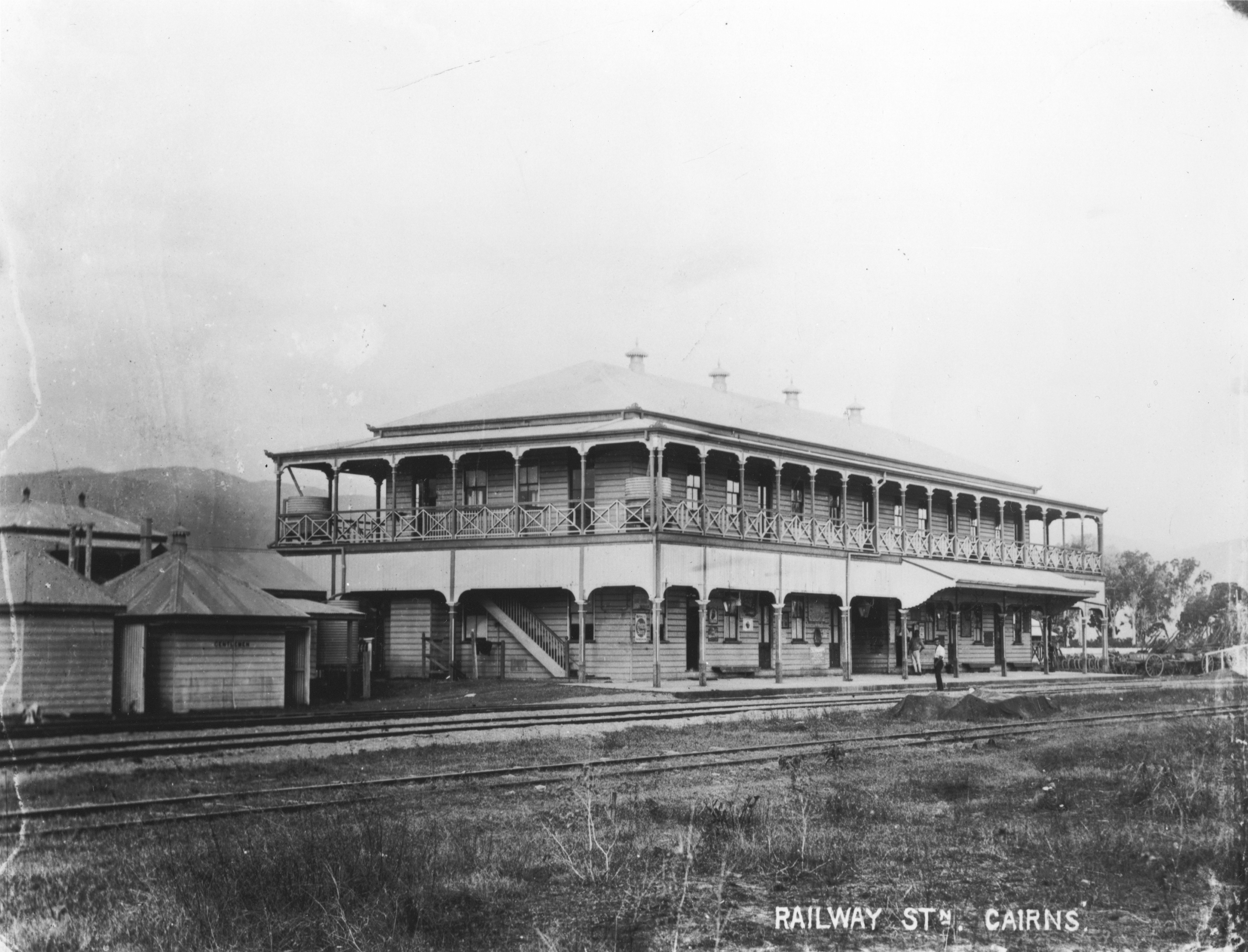
Cairns Railway Station, circa 1890s

The original station was built in 1891, as part of the opening of the first stage of the Tablelands railway to Atherton Tableland, extended over many years to many branches, serving timber, mining, pastoral and tobacco resources. The station building was two-storey timber, with ornate verandahs: typical of tropical architecture of the era.

The 1897 Mulgrave Shire Tramway headed south, was extended, then was absorbed into the North Coast Railway, connecting Brisbane to Cairns via many coastal towns which had hitherto been ports for railways to the hinterland. That route was completed in 1924, and Cairns became a major tourist destination; the line was known as the Sunshine Route; new stock was built in the 1930s for the main train, now named Sunshine Express.

After years of WWII and postwar austerity, the Queensland Railways Department embarked on improvements in the early 1950s. New airconditioned trains were added on key routes: the Brisbane - Cairns one was named The Sunlander. Cairns railway station was rebuilt in 1955 as a two-storey cream brick building of modern design in McLeod Street. As the first modern station, and serving a major destination, it featured prominently in publicity material. Unlike other main stations on the line, it didn't gain a full dining room or bar, just a snackbar kiosk.

As well as the Brisbane trains, the station served regional and commuter trains south and inland: mainly railmotors of three vintages, plus some mixed trains. These were withdrawn progressively. The extensive yards and loco facilities opposite the station were closed and dismantled to release the site for redevelopment. Surviving freight and servicing facilities were relocated to be adjacent to the cargo port. The tracks to the south were relocated out of street running and via the port too.

The current Cairns railway station was opened by the Minister for Transport Vaughan Johnson on 7 May 1996, on the side of the site opposite the August 1955 station. It was built as part of the Cairns Central Shopping Centre and is under the shopping centre's car park.

== Services ==
Cairns is the terminus of Traveltrain's Spirit of Queensland service to Brisbane Roma Street Station. From June 1953 to December 2014, Cairns was the terminus of The Sunlander service which was operated by Traveltrain (the long-distance passenger division of Queensland Rail).

It is the starting point for Kuranda Scenic Railway to Kuranda and the Savannahlander service to Forsayth.

== Platform layout and facilities ==
The station consists of two platforms, located under the car park for Cairns Central Shopping Centre. Platform 1 is used by the Spirit of Queensland service to Brisbane and the Savannahlander to Forsayth, and has a direct link to the Cairns Central Shopping Centre. Platform 2 is used for Kuranda Scenic Railway services and has a direct link to Bunda Street. There is also a Queensland Rail travel centre in the platform 1 concourse and a ticket office for the Kurada Scenic Railway in the platform 2 concourse.

== Transport links ==
Cairns station is the starting point for Premier Motor Services coach services to Brisbane.

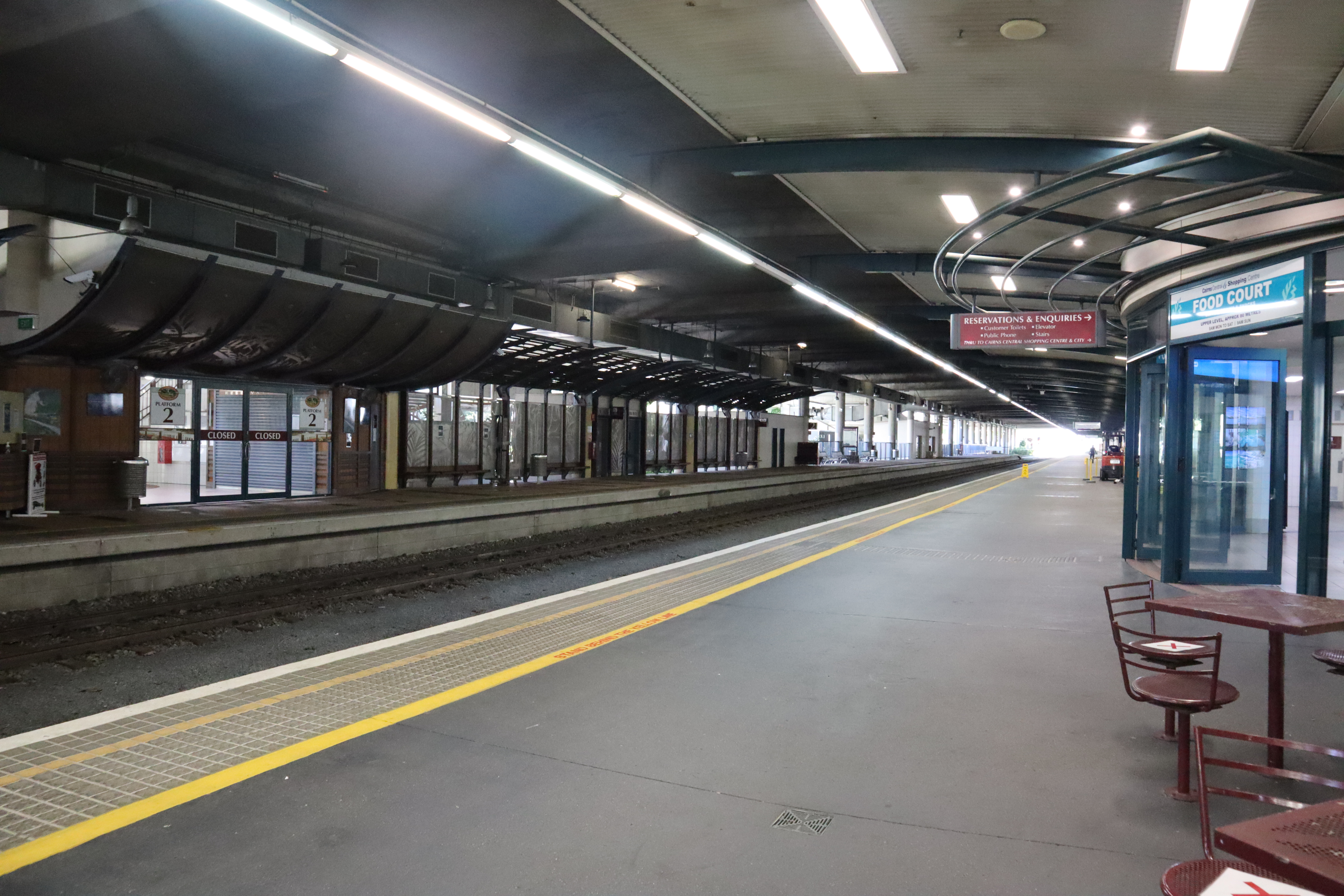
Station platforms in July 2021
