= Solanum angustum =

Conservation status
- Critically Endangered (NCA)

Scientific classification
- Kingdom: Plantae
- Clade: Tracheophytes
- Clade: Angiosperms
- Clade: Eudicots
- Clade: Asterids
- Order: Solanales
- Family: Solanaceae
- Genus: Solanum
- Species: S. angustum

Binomial name
- Solanum angustum Domin

Species of shrub

Solanum angustum is a rhizomatous resprouting herbaceous perennial which is endemic to Queensland. The above ground leaves die off and reshoot every year.

== Distribution and habitat ==
Solanum angustum range occurs from north of Cairns and south-west towards Forsayth.

== Conservation status ==
Solanum angustum is listed as "critically endangered" under the Queensland Nature Conservation Act 1992. It is not listed under the Australian Government Environment Protection and Biodiversity Conservation Act 1999.
