= Wirra Wirra railway station =

Railway station in Queensland, Australia

Coordinates: 18°36′59″S 143°46′02″E

Wirra Wirra railway station is a railway station in the Shire of Etheridge, Queensland, Australia. It is on the heritage-listed Etheridge railway line.
