= Etheridge railway line =

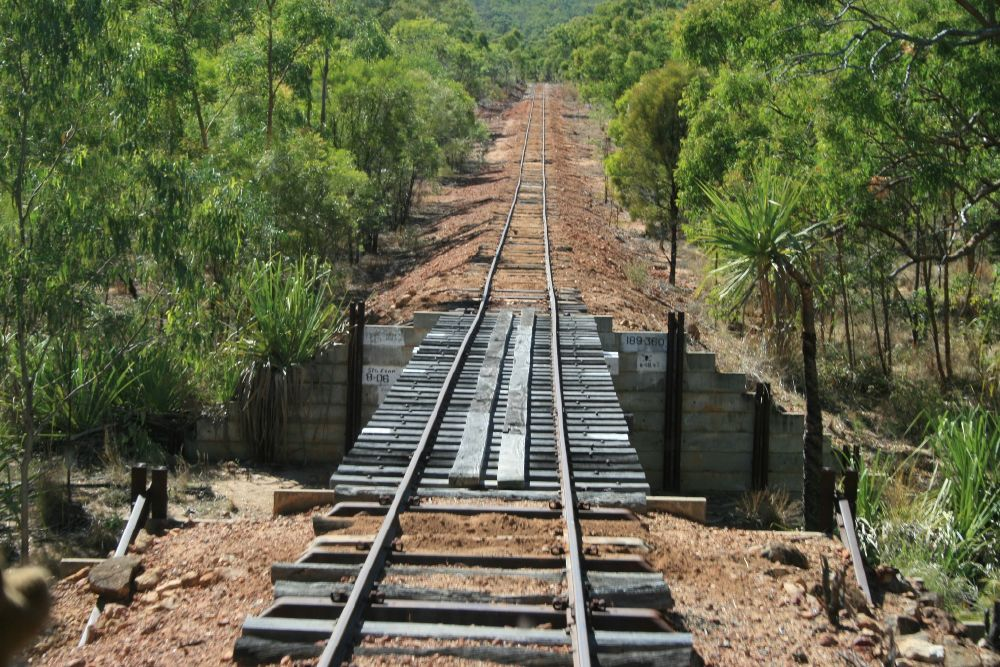
- Bridge on the Etheridge railway line in the Newcastle Range, 2008

- Location within Queensland Location within Australia
- 18.3836°S 143.9631°E
- Location: Between Mount Surprise and Forsayth, both in the Shire of Etheridge, Queensland, Australia

Queensland Heritage Register
- Official name: Etheridge Railway
- Type: state heritage (built)
- Designated: 16 February 2009
- Reference no.: 601637
- Significant period: 1907–1910 (fabric); 1907–1995 (historical use)

The Etheridge railway line is a heritage-listed railway line between Mount Surprise and Forsayth, both in the Shire of Etheridge, Queensland, Australia. It includes Mount Surprise railway station, Einasleigh railway station, Wirra Wirra railway station and Forsayth railway station. Etheridge railway line was added to the Queensland Heritage Register on 16 February 2009.

== History ==
The Etheridge railway line, which branches off the Mareeba-to-Chillagoe railway at Almaden and heads south for 142 miles (229 km) to Forsayth via Mount Surprise and Einasleigh, was built between 1907 and 1910 by the Chillagoe Railway and Mining Company as a private railway line. The same company constructed the railway line from Mareeba to Chillagoe and Mungana between 1898 and 1901. The Etheridge line was built cheaply, with lighter rails and fewer earthworks than the Chillagoe line, to supply ore to the Chillagoe Company's under-utilised Chillagoe smelters. The Chillagoe Company was part of the business empire of John Moffat, and between 1880 and 1914 much of the economic activity of North Queensland was driven by the railways and mining towns created by Moffat's enterprises. The remaining built infrastructure at stations along the Etheridge Railway provides examples of the type of buildings erected by the Chillagoe Company for its railway network.

John Moffat arrived in Brisbane from Scotland in 1862, and in 1872 he opened a general store in Stanthorpe with Robert Love, to take advantage of tin mining in the area. By 1880 Moffat decided to expand his tin-buying business to North Queensland, and that year his prospectors marked out a mineral freehold at the head of the Wild River, near Herberton. Battery machinery was erected in 1881 at "The Great Northern" mine, and the Herberton Tin Company was formed. In 1884 the Loudoun battery was established at Gibbs Creek and Irvinebank (named after Moffat's birthplace) became Moffat's permanent headquarters. A tin smelter was also erected at Irvinebank in 1884, next to Moffat's residence Loudoun House. The Loudoun mill held a pivotal position in the North Queensland economy when Irvinebank was booming in 1899, and at its peak was the largest tin battery and smelter in Australia.

As well as mining and smelting tin, Moffat was also interested in silver and copper. He opened a silver smelter at Montalbion in 1886, and silver deposits were located at Muldiva in late 1889. In 1888 Moffat sent his prospectors to William Atherton's property at Chillagoe to look for copper, and Moffat soon monopolised the new field. The first copper smelter on the Chillagoe field was erected near the Boomerang mine at Calcifer in 1894, and by 1897 there was also a copper smelter at Girofla (Mungana). However, Moffat had plans for a central ore smelter which would replace the Loudoun smelter and the small primitive mills located near individual mine groups.

To supply a central smelter, Moffat needed a network of railways to his mines. He had commissioned the survey of a railway route to Chillagoe in 1892, hoping for a land-grant railway, but the depression had stifled the proposal. The Queensland Government's railway from Cairns reached Mareeba in the early 1890s and Moffat hoped to build a railway inland from this point. However, he needed capital for such a venture, and in 1897 he went to Melbourne to find investors, where he gained the attention of Charles William Chapman and James Smith Reid. In 1897 the Chillagoe Proprietary Company was formed. Reid and Chapman accompanied Moffat to Brisbane in November 1897 to present their railway proposal to the government. The resultant Mareeba to Chillagoe Railway Act of 1897 empowered the Chillagoe Proprietary Company to build a 96-mile (154 km) railway for £431,000, subject only to a government right of purchase after 50 years. In 1898 a new company, Chillagoe Railway and Mines Limited, was formed to take over the assets of the Chillagoe Proprietary Company.

The 1897 Act also approved a central smelter site at Barron Falls, but a short-lived Labor Government quashed the project in December 1899. The Chillagoe Railway and Mines Company was forced to develop its central smelter inland, accruing high transport costs. A central smelter site was selected at Chillagoe Creek, and smelters were constructed during 1900 and 1901. From 1902 the smelters extracted gold, silver and copper from ore which was supplied from Redcap and Calcifer, and they also treated lead ore from the Girofla mine and Torpy's Crooked Creek silver lead mine. In 1901 a copper smelter was also built at Mount Garnet, where copper had been discovered in 1882, but this was not linked to the Company's rail network (at Lappa) until 1902.

Construction of a 3 ft 6 in (1,067 mm) gauge railway with 60 pounds per yard (29.8 kg/m) steel rails was supervised by Archibald Smith Frew, the Chillagoe Company's Engineer-in-Charge, who had worked as an assistant to George Phillips on the Normanton to Croydon railway line, built between 1888 and 1891. Construction of the Chillagoe line began in August 1898, and it opened to Lappa on 1 October 1900 and to Chillagoe and Mungana in 1901. Labourers were hired on piece-work, and substantial work was sub-contracted. Stone and concrete culverts and drains were inserted in all embankments over 3 feet (0.91 m) high, and steel and masonry bridges were constructed.

In an attempt to obtain more copper ore for the Chillagoe smelters, since ore reserves around Chillagoe had been overestimated, the Chillagoe Company sought to build a branch line from the Chillagoe Railway, south to the Etheridge goldfield and the Einasleigh copper mine. There had been a proposal by John Robb for a private railway to Georgetown in 1890 and in 1902 the Einasleigh Freehold Mining Company proposed a tramway from Almaden to Einasleigh, but nothing eventuated. Negotiations between the Chillagoe Company and the Queensland Government occurred from 1904, and approval was finally given to build the railway subject to the provisions of the Etheridge Railway Act 1906. The Chillagoe Company agreed to build a railway to a point near Georgetown, for a cost not exceeding £450,000. The government would operate and maintain this private line for 15 years, guaranteeing the company a profit of 2.5% on its outlay, and then purchase the line. It was the first step towards the present system under which mineral railways are government owned and operated but built with private capital repaid out of profits.

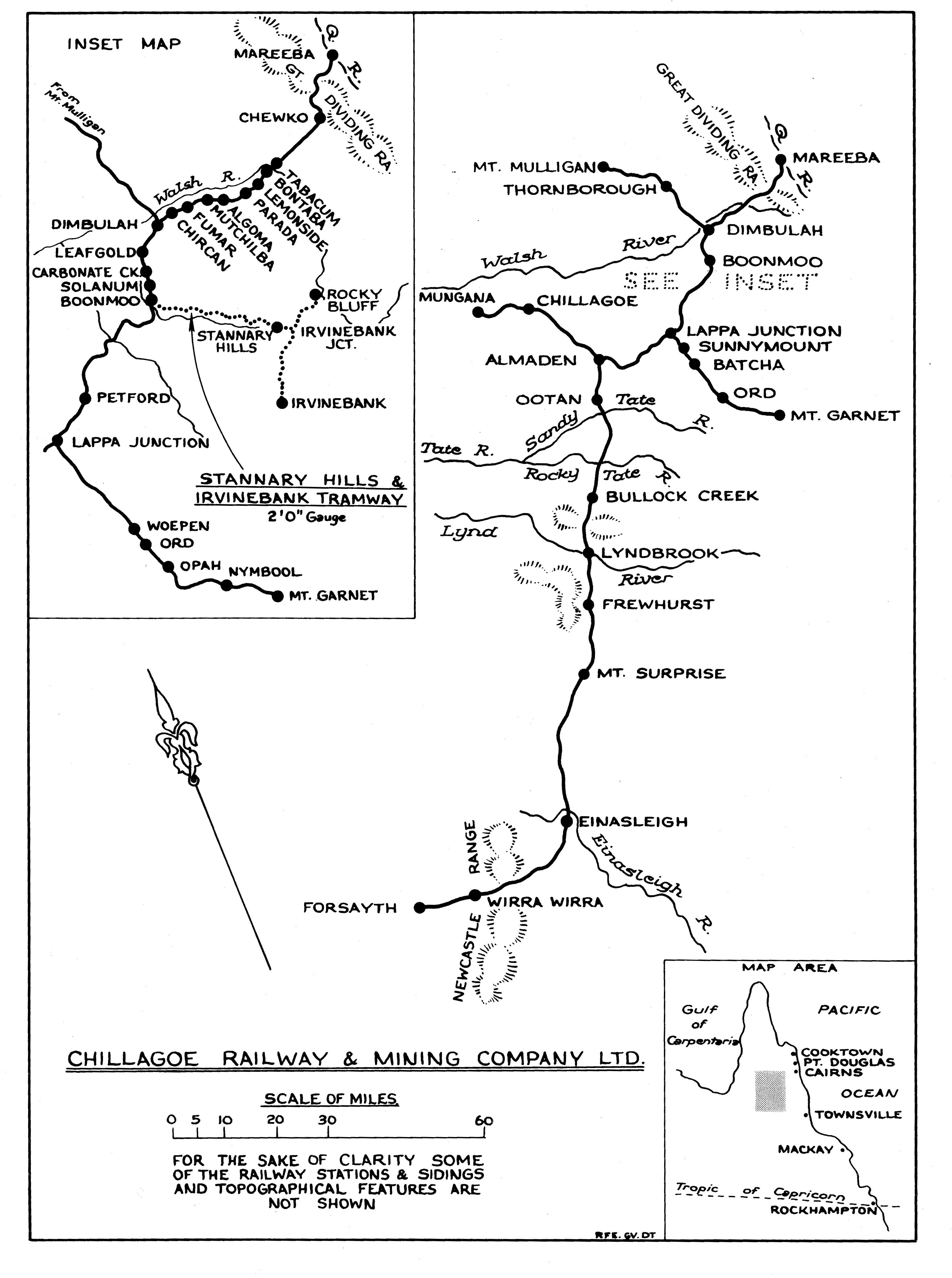
Chillagoe Railway and Mining Company railway map

The railway construction project was again overseen by Archibald Smith Frew, and began in 1907, branching off south from Almaden. The station at Almaden (not included within the heritage boundary of the Etheridge line) was opened in 1901. It became a busy centre for trucking cattle and servicing locomotives.

The Etheridge Railway was constructed in the most economical way possible using timber for the bridges, with sharp curves, steep grades and light (41 1/4 pound per yard) rails. There were fewer earthworks than on the Mareeba to Chillagoe line, and minimal ballast was used under the sleepers. Despite controversy, the Chillagoe Company changed the line terminus from Georgetown to Charleston (Forsayth) because it was thought that the mines near Charleston were more promising than those near Georgetown.

By 31 August 1907, the railhead was at 12 miles (19 km). The line was opened to Mount Surprise in May 1908, and the railway station at Mount Surprise 108.5 kilometres (67.4 mi) from Almaden) was named in December 1909. In 1916, Mount Surprise station had a gate, siding, telephone, scales, fork, cattle yards, and a horse and carriage loading bank. By 1932 it had a station building, closet, goods shed, loading bank, motor shed, camping quarters, two fettler's quarters, enginemen's quarters, coal stage, and cattle yards. Mount Surprise became an important cattle trucking centre after 1951, with the reconditioning of the line from Almaden for steam locomotives. In 1970 approval was given to erect the railway station building from Tumoulin at Mount Surprise as a cottage (removed 2008). A repair shed for the Savannahlander tourist railmotor and an interpretation centre were built in the mid-1990s.

Although construction was delayed by strikes in mid-1908 over the pay rate for railway workers, in February 1909 the line was opened to Einasleigh 165.5 kilometres (102.8 mi) from Almaden. The Einasleigh copper mine was originally discovered by Richard Daintree in the mid 1860s, but the cost of transporting ore from the site made it uneconomic and it soon closed. The location was lost until the 1890s and a renewed interest in copper on the Etheridge field. A township known as Copperfield was established on the banks of the Copperfield River to service 12 copper mining leases extant by 1899, and this was surveyed as Einasleigh in 1900. The mine was reopened that year by the Einasleigh Freehold Mining Company, in which John Moffat had acquired an interest. By 1901 copper matte from a smelter at Einasleigh was being transported to Almaden by camel train. The coming of the Etheridge Railway in 1909 allowed Einasleigh to boom, and it was the largest centre on the Etheridge between 1907 and 1910. By 1910 six ore trains a week were running from Einasleigh to the Chillagoe smelters, and in 1911 the mine was purchased by the Chillagoe Company. It closed in 1914, and was reopened by the Queensland Government between 1920 and 1922.

By 1916 Einasleigh station consisted of a station building, siding, telephone, scales, fork, cattle yards, and a horse and cart loading bank. By 1935 it also had a goods shed (not extant). As both Einasleigh and Forsayth were expected to provide substantial amounts of copper ore, the importance of the towns' railway terminals meant that station master's houses, designed by Frew, were built at both towns. A branch line to the Einasleigh copper mine forked off to the north of the station, and today the remaining section off this line leads to cattle yards.

By July 1909 a train was running from Almaden to Reedy Springs (Wirra Wirra), and by the end of August 1909 cuttings and embankments had been made to within 7 miles (11 km) of Charleston, with stone culverts and drains complete to 2 miles (3.2 km) from Charleston. More earthworks were required on the Newcastle Range and Delaney Gorge sections than elsewhere on the line. Ore trains were running to Chillagoe from a terminus just short of Charleston by January 1910, and the terminus at 229.5 kilometres (142.6 mi) from Almaden was renamed "Forsayth" in December 1910. The regular mixed train ran from Forsayth to Almaden three times a week, returning the next day, although there was only one train a week during World War I. By 1916 Forsayth railway station had a station building, siding, phone, scales, turning fork, cattle yards, and horse and cart loading bank. By 1935 it also had a gate and a goods shed. The cattle yards were rebuilt in 1970, but no cattle have been handled from the station since January 1993. The framed tent quarters date from about 1914, with 1930s additions.

The working and maintenance of the Etheridge railway was taken over by the government from 5 February 1911. From the beginning, cattle were transported from the various stations and sidings along the line, but this traffic increased in importance with the decline of mining. Apart from the main stations on the line there were a number of sidings, the majority situated between Almaden and Mount Surprise. Little survives at these sidings today, other than siding tracks, concrete slabs, some signals and points' equipment, loading banks and cattle yard remnants.

Around 1917 a lime burning business started at Ootann, 13 kilometres (8.1 mi) south of Almaden, using old kilns used during the construction of the railway, and a siding was installed about 1918. Ootann was the limit of steam operation from 1927 to 1951. It had a shelter shed by 1935, and an overhead gantry for loading lime. The present main line was originally the siding, as the main line was moved to install the gantry. Gelaro at 30 kilometres (19 mi) had a crossing loop, levers and a shelter shed by 1969. Bullock Creek at 52 kilometres (32 mi) had a siding and railway phone by 1916, and was the site of a permanent fettler's (rail line maintenance worker's) camp by 1932. There was a side loading bank and shelter by 1935, and private cattle yards by 1951. A 30,000-imperial-gallon (140,000 L) water tank was present, although this no longer exists. The loading of cattle at Bullock Creek ceased in late 1991.

In 1908 Lyndbrook at 69 kilometres (43 mi) had a goods shed, engine shed, station house and forkline. It was named Lyndbrook in December 1909, and by 1935 it consisted of a siding, telephone, fork, side loading bank, shelter, and goods shed (the latter was removed that year). Private cattle yards existed by 1954, but no cattle have been loaded since January 1993. Fossilbrook Creek at 77 kilometres (48 mi) consisted of a telephone in 1950. Nearby Fossilbrook was a busy tin-mining town in 1905, with two hotels, but nothing remains of the town. Frewhurst at 88 kilometres (55 mi) had a sawmill about 1908, and was named in 1909. By 1916 it had a gate, siding, telephone and loading bank. It had a shelter by 1935, and a private cattle yard by 1951, which was enlarged in the mid 1970s. Livestock has not been handled from Frewhurst since late 1991.

South of Einasleigh, there was a siding at 178.6 kilometres (111.0 mi) at Teasdale (Teesdale) adjacent to the Teasdale Mine. There was a hotel here in 1909, but nothing remains of this siding today, or of a sawmill siding 198 kilometres (123 mi). A siding at Reedy Springs at 208.5 kilometres (129.6 mi) was renamed Wirra Wirra in December 1910. In 1916 it consisted of a gate, siding, telephone, and fork. By 1935 it also had a side loading bank and a shelter. A new stock yard was built in 1960.

The railway extension did not make a great deal of difference to the financial stability of the Chillagoe Company. The high cost of fuel for the smelters, a lack of ore, increasing wages, low metal prices and over-capitalisation on railways and smelters all contributed to the closure of the Chillagoe smelters. The Company asked for a government loan in February 1914 and when this was refused the company shut down its smelting and ore-buying operations. Ironically, the price of metal rose during the course of World War I, while the smelters were idle.

Protracted negotiations between the government and the Chillagoe Company led to the passing of The Chillagoe and Etheridge Railways Act 1918 and the resumption of the company assets, including the Etheridge Railway, on 20 June 1919. The Almaden to Forsayth line was purchased for £225,000. The Chillagoe smelters were reopened in January 1920, and were operated by the government until 1943.

John Moffat retired in 1912, and died in June 1918. He helped develop North Queensland by bringing both public and private capital into the region, and from 1880 he had built up mining as the key foundation of the region's economy. His railway lines also assisted pastoralists, as railways resulted in cheaper rates for transporting supplies, and cattle could be sent to meatworks in better condition. Although gold mining briefly revived mining traffic on the Etheridge line in the 1930s, it was pastoralism that kept the towns of the Etheridge alive.

In January 1927 six bridges along the Etheridge line were destroyed by floods and the government sought to close the line beyond the lime works at Ootann, just south of Almaden. Due to public pressure the line was reopened in 1928, after the building of low-level bridges, but it was only maintained to standard suitable for use by railmotors. Steam trains did not operate on the line again until after the section from Almaden to Mount Surprise was reconditioned between 1949 and 1951 to allow the transport of heavier loads of cattle than could be pulled by diesel engines. This included adding 60 pounds per yard (29.8 kg/m) rails on corners, regrading in six places, and one deviation. From the 1950s diesel-mechanical locomotives operated in multiple south of Mount Surprise to allow larger loads of cattle to be moved on the section of line to Forsayth. They were followed by diesel electric locomotives. This work assisted the cattle industry but the building of a bituminized "Beef Road" from Georgetown to Cairns reduced the use of the Etheridge line for cattle from the late 1960s. The use of steam locomotives to Mount Surprise ended in 1969.

The Etheridge line was closed again after floods in 1974, but reopened in December that year. In late 1994 and early 1995 the local community protested against the proposed ending of the Cairns to Forsayth freight and passenger rail service, which would leave only the Mount Surprise to Forsayth section of the Etheridge line operating as a tourist railway (the Savannahlander). Einasleigh's population blockaded the railway for four days in late December 1994, holding the "Last Great Train Ride" hostage. During this period the locals fed and housed the train passengers and crew until the blockade was lifted after negotiation with the police. The line from Mareeba to Mount Surprise was closed and the Savannahlander tourist railmotor started operation from Mount Surprise to Forsayth in April 1995. However, after an upgrade of the line for sugar syrup trains from Cairns to Arriga, and limited restoration of the rest of the line, the Savannahlander started travelling from Cairns to Forsayth in September 1998. Over four days the Savannahlander, operated by Cairns Kuranda Steam, travels to Mareeba, then west on the Chillagoe line as far as Almaden, before heading south to Forsayth on the Etheridge line and then returning to Cairns. It uses three railmotor units, including two 2000 Class PD cars (1963) and one 2051 class PLDT car (1971). The Etheridge line is currently maintained by Queensland Rail, on a contract basis for Queensland Transport. During 2007 and 2008 many of the Etheridge line's timber sleepers have been replaced with steel sleepers, leaving a 1:1 ratio of timber to steel.

== Description ==
The Etheridge Railway line runs for about 230 kilometres (140 mi) from Almaden to Forsayth, and the section from Mount Surprise to Forsayth (included in the heritage boundary) is about 121 kilometres (75 mi) long. Built cheaply, the line rarely uses metal ballasting under the railway sleepers, and most sleepers are set directly onto the soil. Half of the sleepers are timber, and half are steel, due to a recent replacement project. Soon after heading south from Almaden, the rails change from 60 pounds per yard (30 kg/m) to 41.25 pounds per yard (20.46 kg/m), with a noticeable increase in noise and vibration. The line tends to follow the lie of the land, with small cuttings and embankments, although there are larger earth embankments and cuttings on the Newcastle Range section of the line, between Einasleigh and Forsayth. The formation of the line between Almaden and Mount Surprise (not included within the heritage boundary) does not follow its original gradient, due to its reconditioning between 1949 and 1951.

The surviving railway buildings, rails, sidings, turning forks, cattle yards, loading banks, stone pitched bridges and culverts, stone cuttings, sandboxes (for refilling the sand-dispensing units in front of train wheels), water tank, signage, and signals and points infrastructure at the Mount Surprise, Einasleigh and Forsayth railway stations and along the Etheridge Railway between Mount Surprise and Forsayth are significant.

=== Mount Surprise railway station ===
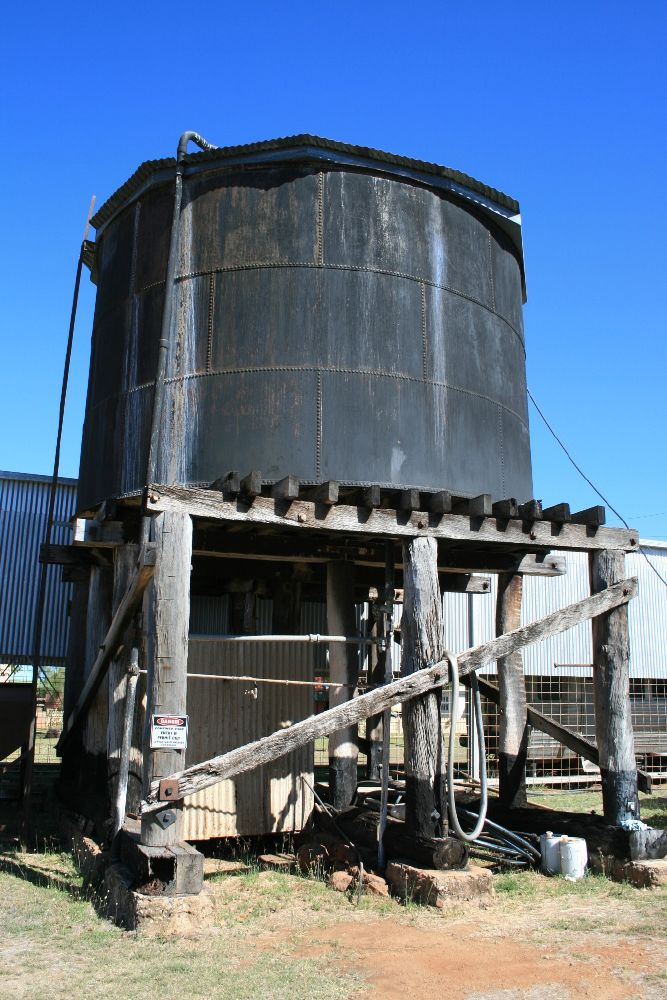
Water tank at Mount Surprise railway station, 2008

The significant elements of this station include: a steel semaphore signal frame and signal arm at the northeast end of the yards, west of the line; a turning fork southwest of the signal and to the north of the line (and associated points levers); a trolley shed south of the fork; two railway houses southwest of the fork and north of the line on Lot 73 SP127336; a metal sandbox, large water tank, tank stand and shower to the north of the modern carriage shelter built over the main line southwest of the fork; a siding south of the main line (and associated points levers); a goods shed on the south side of the siding; a station building southwest of the goods shed and north of the main line; and a timber shed southwest of the station building, on the north side of the main line. Non significant elements include: modern demountable buildings and a shelter shed at the apex of the fork; a modern highset house north of the main line on Lot 73 SP127336; the steel framed, gable roofed, corrugated zincalume-clad carriage shade over the main line, and the skillion roofed, steel framed and corrugated zincalume-clad interpretation shed northeast of the station building; a small timber shed just southwest of the water tank; and a QR telephone box southwest of the station building.

The passenger station is a lowset timber-framed building, with chamferboard-clad walls and a skillion corrugated iron roof that has been extended to form an awning supported by straight timber brackets. The central waiting area has a picket fence and gate, toilets are on the left hand side of the building, and an office with a stable style door is on the right. Some original sash windows survive. There is a modern plastic water tank to the rear of the station building (not significant). The goods shed is a lowset, timber-framed building clad in corrugated iron. Its gabled corrugated iron roof has an awning over a loading platform on the north-west elevation which is supported by curved timber brackets. The goods shed has timber doors on its north- west, south-west and south-east elevations, and narrow windows on the north-east and south-west elevations. A plastic water tank on the north-east elevation is not significant. The small, gable-roofed timber shed south-west of the station building is clad in chamferboard, with an exposed stud to the exterior. It stands on a recent timber and steel platform, has a single timber door on its south-east elevation, a double timber door on its north-west elevation, and fixed timber louvers at each end. The area between the above three buildings has been turfed, up to and between the rails, which gives the appearance that the train is running on grass.

The large riveted iron water tank on a timber stand provided water for engines and the station complex. There is an unused corrugated iron- clad shower room underneath the tank stand, which contains the remains of plumbing fittings. The five-bay trolley shed is clad in corrugated iron, with a skillion roof, and gates of timber battens. The two lowset, gable-roofed houses north of the line are timber-framed, and clad in timber and fibrous cement sheeting. Their yards have gates opening into the railway station area.

=== Einasleigh railway station ===
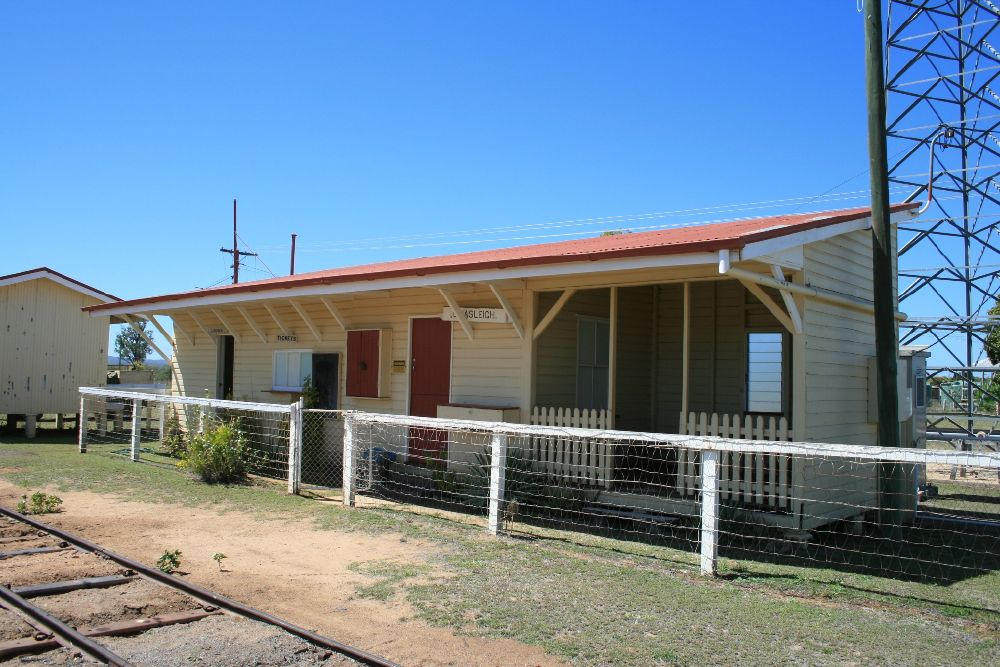
Einasleigh railway station, 2008

The significant elements of this station include semaphore signal frames (no signal arms) and sand boxes at the approaches to each end of the station; a siding north of the main line and a small siding south of the main line (and any associated points levers); the station building to the south of the main line; a small shed to the north-east of the station building; a loading bank south-west of the station building; and a loading bank on the north side of the northern siding (site of the removed goods shed), to the south-west of the station building. The fork line north of the station, and the cattle yards at the apex of the fork, are also significant, although they are outside the railway reserve. The nearby station master's residence at Einasleigh is separately listed on the Queensland Heritage Register.

The skillion-roofed passenger station is lowset, and is clad with weatherboards over a timber frame. Straight timber brackets support the awning, and there is a picket fence to the waiting shed section at the south-west end of the building. An office is at the centre of the building, with toilets at the north-east end. The small gable-roofed shed is clad in corrugated iron, and is set on concrete stumps. It has double timber doors and a small timber loading platform on its north- west elevation, which is reached by modern steel steps with a steel balustrade. The loading banks are made of earth, with retaining walls made with a combination of concrete, steel and timber.

=== Forsayth railway station ===
The significant elements of Forsayth Station include: a semaphore signal frame with signal arm at the east end of the yards, south of the main line; a trolley shed south of the line at the east end of the station; a siding north of the main line, and a turning fork north of the main line; another trolley shed south of the main line near the start of the east arm of the fork; a sandbox and a points lever to the east of the second trolley shed; loading bank and a signal lever south of the main line; a station building to the south of the main line and west of the loading bank; a goods shed north of the siding and west of the station building; cattle yards west of the fork; a loading bank east of the apex of the fork; and a framed tent quarters east of the apex of the fork. The nearby station master's residence at Forsayth is separately listed on the Queensland Heritage Register.

The station building is a lowset, chamferboard-clad, timber-framed building standing on concrete stumps. It has a skillion roof clad in corrugated steel with modern gutters and downpipes, and the building has been partly reclad in Hardiplank. The original windows have been replaced. The building has been modified internally, and now consists of a women's toilet and an office, the shelter section having been enclosed. Two plastic water tanks to the south of the building are not significant. The gable-roofed goods shed is clad with corrugated iron, and the awning over the small timber loading dock on the southern elevation is supported on curved timber brackets. There is a concrete loading dock on the east elevation of the goods shed, which has timber doors on its north, south and east elevations. The two skillion roofed, two-bay trolley sheds are clad in corrugated iron, with corrugated iron sliding doors. The loading bank near the station building is made of earth, with concrete retaining walls, as is the loading bank near the tent quarters.

The framed tent quarters consist of two gable-roofed structures and a skillion-roofed bathroom. The northern structure is clad with corrugated iron and has a skillion-roofed stove recess to the north, and the southern structure is clad with chamferboard with timber studs exposed internally. Just to the east of the northern structure is a small bathroom clad with fibrous cement sheeting. All three elements of the quarters are linked by an open timber deck. The two main structures stand on concrete stumps, while the bathroom stands on metal stumps. The roof of the southern structure used to be supported independently on freestanding timber posts and over-sailed the ceiling line in the form of a tent. This has collapsed to the ground, although the roof of the southern structure is still clad with timber boards. There are two tank stands, to the east and west of the quarters, although only the east stand still has a corrugated iron tank. A corrugated iron-clad earth closet is located to the north of the quarters. The cattle yards are steel; with a loading ramp to the fork, and the northern section of the yards is made of timber.

=== The Newcastle Range and Delaney Gorge section of line ===
The section of the Etheridge Railway over the Newcastle range and through the Delaney Gorge has more earthworks than the rest of the railway. The railway track runs along the north face of the Delaney Gorge and along the bed of the Delaney River for a short distance. The significant elements within this section of the railway include any stone pitched bridge piers and abutments, stone pitched culverts, and stone cuttings. A large stone pitched culvert is located near Native Well, east of Wirra Wirra. A bridge over Starlight Creek, just east of Delaney Gorge, has stone piers and abutments, and a small bridge just east of Wirra Wirra has stone abutments. Bridges constructed with stonework are significant due to their rarity on the Etheridge line.

There is a siding at Wirra Wirra, 208.5 kilometres (129.6 mi) from Almaden), on the tableland of the Newcastle Range. Within the rail reserve there is a remnant of the east branch of the fork; and concrete slabs and concrete water tank footings south of the main line. Outside the railway reserve, near the location of the removed western arm of the fork, there is an earth and steel loading bank and some timber cattle yard posts. The modern QR telephone box and its supporting infrastructure are not significant.

=== Timer trestle bridges ===
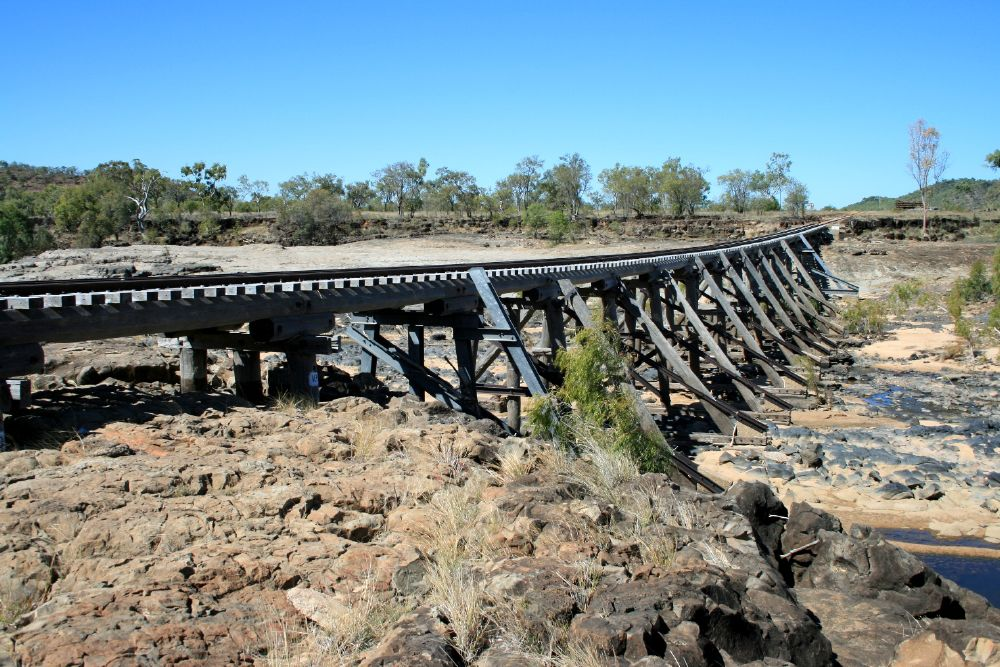
Copperfield River bridge, 2008

The line has a large number of short timber trestle bridges with concrete abutments, along with a smaller number of medium-size timber trestle bridges, such as the High Bridge in the Delaney Gorge. Longer bridges on the line include those at Junction Creek, Lighthouse Creek, the Einasleigh River and the Copperfield River. Some bridges have one or more concrete piers, and some timbers have been replaced with steel. The bridges without stonework were designed to be cheaply replaced if damaged during floods, and the larger bridges have been replaced at various times; for example the Copperfield Bridge was destroyed in 1927, 1980 and 2002.

== Heritage listing ==
Etheridge Railway was listed on the Queensland Heritage Register on 16 February 2009 having satisfied the following criteria.

The place is important in demonstrating the evolution or pattern of Queensland's history.

The Etheridge Railway, constructed by John Moffat's Chillagoe Railway and Mines Company between 1907 and 1910, was a significant component of an important, large-scale, privately built mining railway network in North Queensland and is important in demonstrating the widespread development of mining and transport infrastructure in this part of the State.

The railway stations at Mount Surprise, Einasleigh and Forsayth and the route of the Etheridge Railway between Mount Surprise and Forsayth, including surviving railway buildings, rails, sidings, turning forks, loading banks, stone pitched bridges and culverts, stone cuttings, sandboxes, water tank, signage, and signals and points infrastructure, are important surviving evidence of the efforts of the Chillagoe Railway and Mines Company to supply copper ore to its smelters at Chillagoe.

The arrangement under which the State government maintained and operated the Etheridge Railway initially as a private line – with an option to purchase after 15 years – was the first step towards the present system under which mineral railways are government owned and operated but built with private capital repaid out of profits.

The station complexes at the mining towns of Einasleigh and Forsayth demonstrate the economic importance of these locations to the Chillagoe Company. Both stations have impressive triple-gabled station master's residences designed by AS Frew.

The Mount Surprise railway station complex and other remaining evidence of cattle transportation at the main stations along the Etheridge Railway, such as cattle yards and loading banks, are important in demonstrating the role that the railway played in maintaining pastoral activity in the area before the construction of the bitumen "Beef Road" in the 1960s.

The place demonstrates rare, uncommon or endangered aspects of Queensland's cultural heritage.

The tent quarters at Forsayth is a rare surviving Queensland example of its type, and provides evidence of the amenities considered appropriate for railway workers in the early twentieth century.

The large iron water tank at Mount Surprise is an example of a type now becoming rare.

The place is important in demonstrating the principal characteristics of a particular class of cultural places.

The surviving railway buildings, rails, sidings, turning forks, cattle yards, loading banks, stone pitched bridges and culverts, stone cuttings, sandboxes, water tank, signage, and signals and points infrastructure at the Mount Surprise, Einasleigh and Forsayth railway stations and along the Etheridge Railway between Mount Surprise and Forsayth all demonstrate the principal characteristics of a railway line that was used for mining and pastoral purposes.

The route and formation of the line between Mount Surprise and Forsayth, with its steep gradients and sharp curves and accompanying lack of earthworks, along with the relative lack of steel, stone or brick bridge piers and abutments, demonstrates the nature of a railway line that was built as economically as possible. The section of the railway over the Newcastle Range and through the Delaney Gorge, although it has more earthworks and stone cuttings than any other section of the railway, also demonstrates a cheap form of railway construction, due to its sharp curves and steep gradients.

The Mount Surprise station complex has the most intact group of railway buildings, and its station building, goods shed, small timber shed and water tank are all intact examples of their type. Other elements, such as two railway houses, a trolley shed, sandbox, sidings, turning fork and signals and points levers all contribute to an understanding of how a rural railway station functioned. The shower under the water tank illustrates the past lifestyle of railway workers.

The place has a special association with the life or work of a particular person, group or organisation of importance in Queensland's history.

The Etheridge Railway was an essential element of the business empire of John Moffat and the Chillagoe Company. Between 1880 and 1914 much of the economic activity of North Queensland was driven by the railways and mining towns created by Moffat's enterprises.
