= Cairns Central =

Shopping mall in Cairns, Queensland, Australia

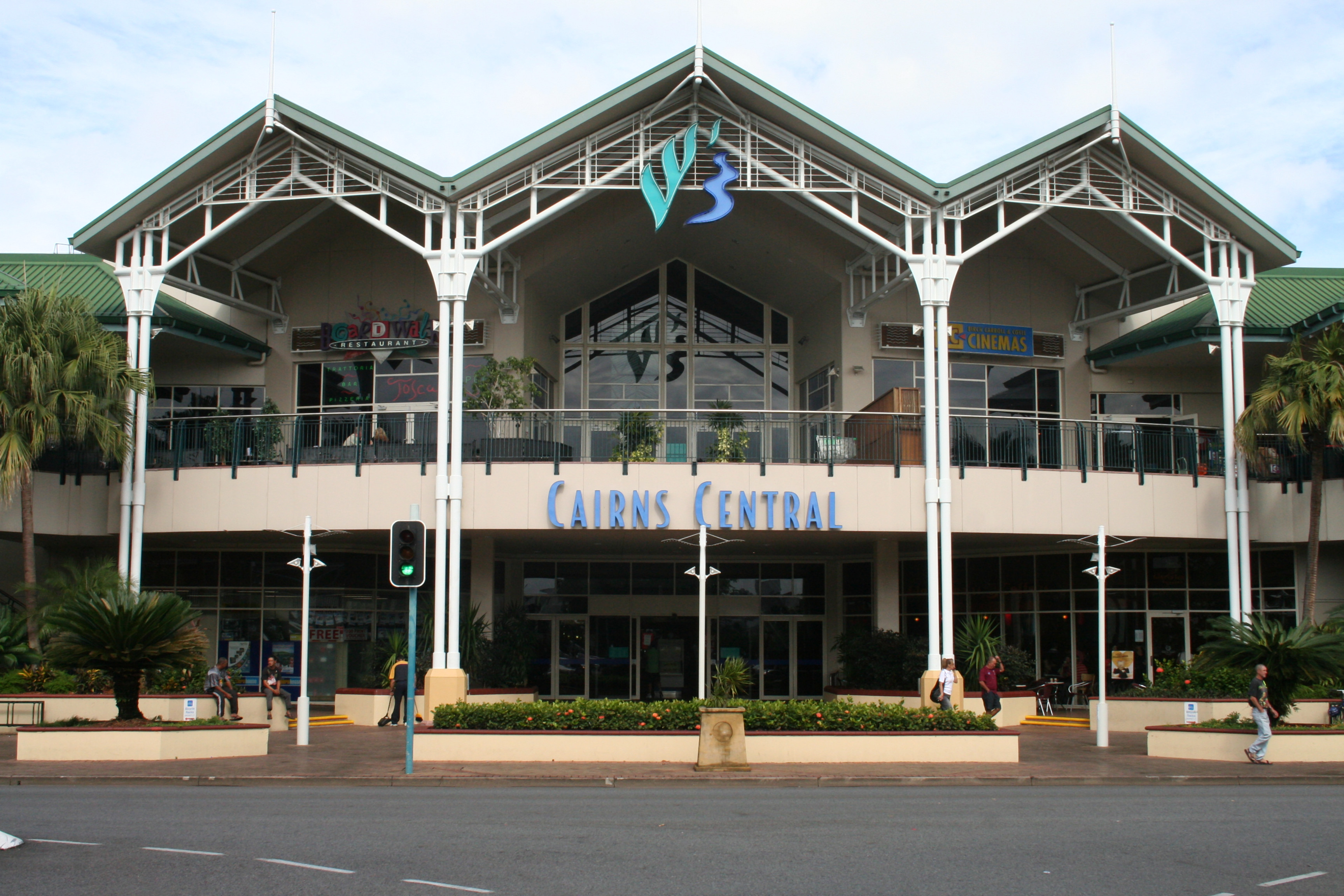
- Cairns Central from outside the main entrance on Shields Street
- Location: Cairns City, Cairns, Queensland Australia
- Coordinates: 16°55′30″S 145°46′19″E
- Opened: 1997; 29 years ago
- Num. of stores: 180
- Num. of anchor tenants: 6
- Floor area: 58,000 m^{2} (620,000 sq ft)
- Floors: 2 (Trading area)
- Parking: 2,473
- Website: cairnscentral.com.au

Cairns Central Shopping Centre is in Cairns City, Cairns, Far North Queensland, Australia. It is Cairns' biggest shopping centre. The centre was opened in late 1997 and is the second multi-story shopping centre in northern Queensland. The shopping centre is built over the Cairns railway station, which is incorporated with the centre. Pedestrian access to the station is through the car park on the bottom floor, or a pedestrian walkway on the second floor. Construction of the shopping centre was delayed temporarily due to damage suffered from Tropical Cyclone Justin in early 1997.

Cairns Central currently contains 5 anchor stores including:

- 1 Floor Myer department Store.
- Target discount department store. The store temporarily pulled out of the centre in April 2021 to swap locations with Kmart. The store opened in November 2021.
- Kmart discount department store. It originally opened in the former Bi-Lo supermarket until it was moved into the former Target space in 2021.
- Coles Supermarket.
- Woolworths Supermarket. Opened on 15 December 2020 as part of a recent redevelopment and took over the second-floor of Myer.
- Event Cinemas Cinema complex.

Cairns Central as of June 2008 recorded more than $353 million in sales and has centre visits of 10 million a year.

== Awards ==
The centre has, for the second time running, been named among the state's top shopping centres. Cairns Central on 13 February 2009 was named runner-up in the 2008 Queensland Shopping Centre of the Year Awards in the Super/Major regional centres exceeding 50,000 square metres (540,000 sq ft).

== Ownership court case ==
In August 2007, it was revealed joint owners Westfield and Australian Prime Property Fund were arguing about Westfield's insistence on managing the centre itself. APPF said it wanted current managers Lend Lease to stay in charge and Westfield took the matter to the New South Wales Supreme Court. A spokesman for APPF confirmed the matter had been referred for mediation, expected to start about 18 February 2008. Westfield bought their 50% share in 2006 from Coles Myer and put itself forward as the centre's manager but this was rejected by Lend Lease.

An attempt by Westfield in the New South Wales Supreme Court on Monday 16 June to force a public auction of the shopping centre – valued at $407 million – was rejected as was an alternative bid to appoint receivers to sell the centre. Lend Lease's contract over Cairns Central ran out on 30 June 2008 and was, and still is, uncertain who will manage the centre.

As of October 2011, Lendlease purchased Westfield's 50% share in Cairns Central, which leaves Lendlease as the primary owner of the shopping centre via Lendlease's APPF Commercial Investment arm.

== Redevelopment project ==
On 18 July 2019, Lendlease announced their $60 million redevelopment project for Cairns Central. The project includes a new Woolworths and food market, parking improvements, and other facilities. Construction of this redevelopment went on until its completion on 15 December 2020.

== Gallery ==
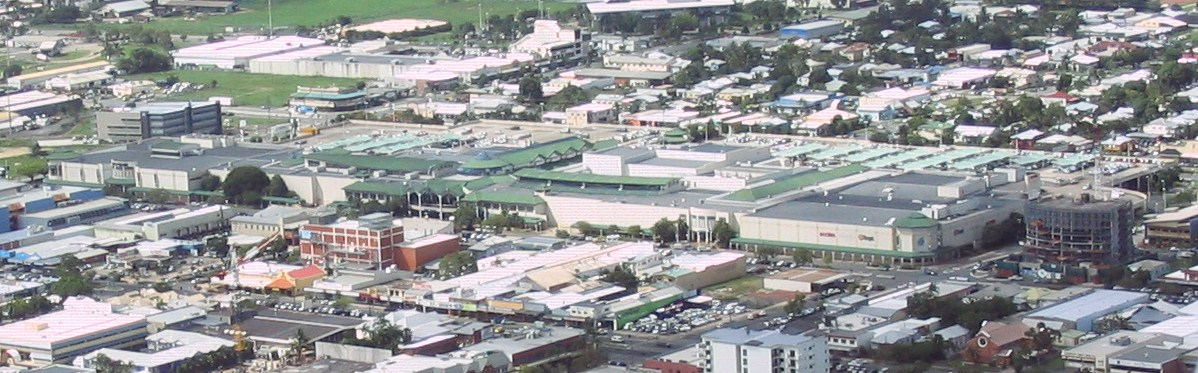
Cairns Central from the air facing south, circa 2006

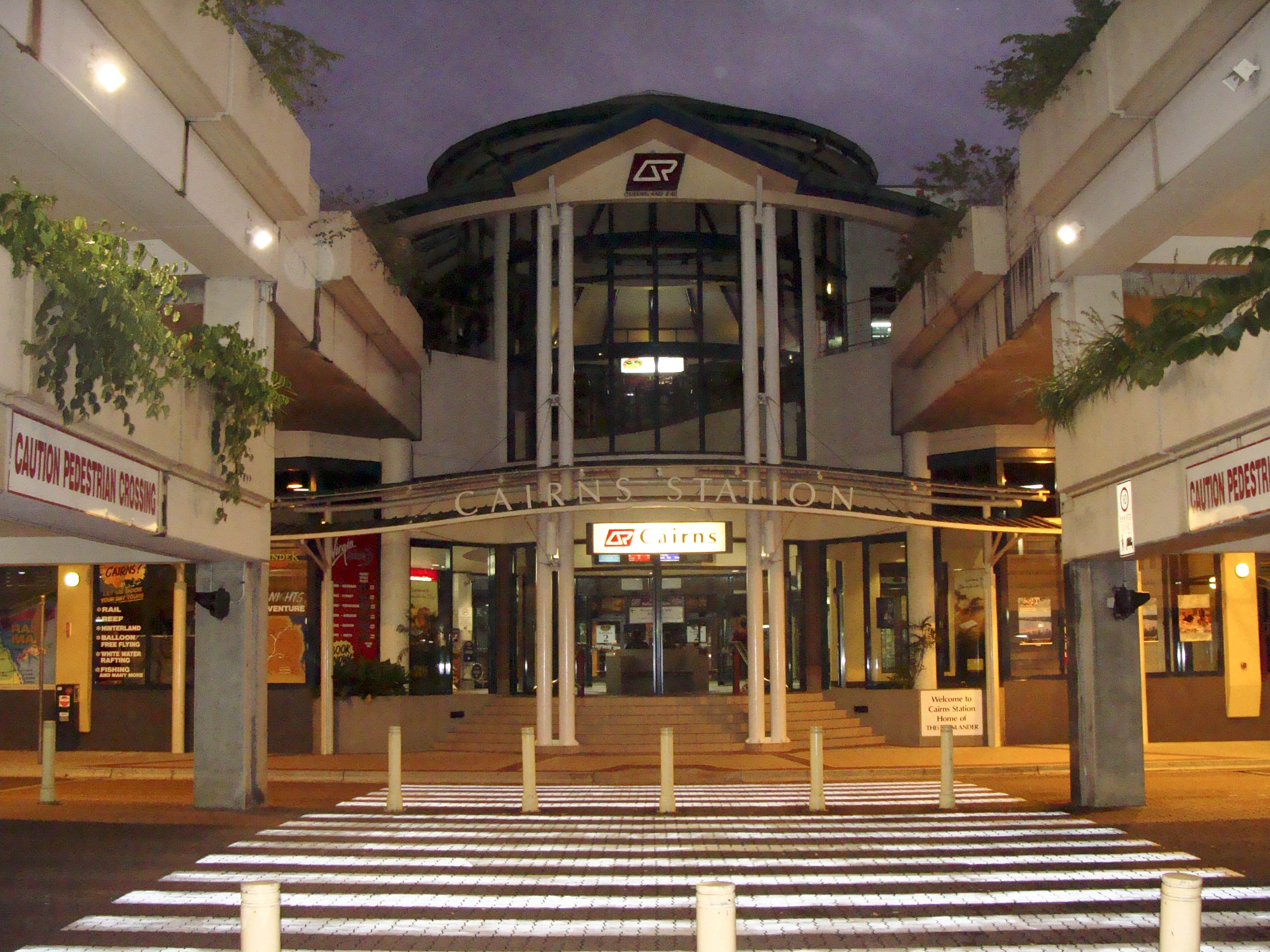
Cairns railway station at dusk

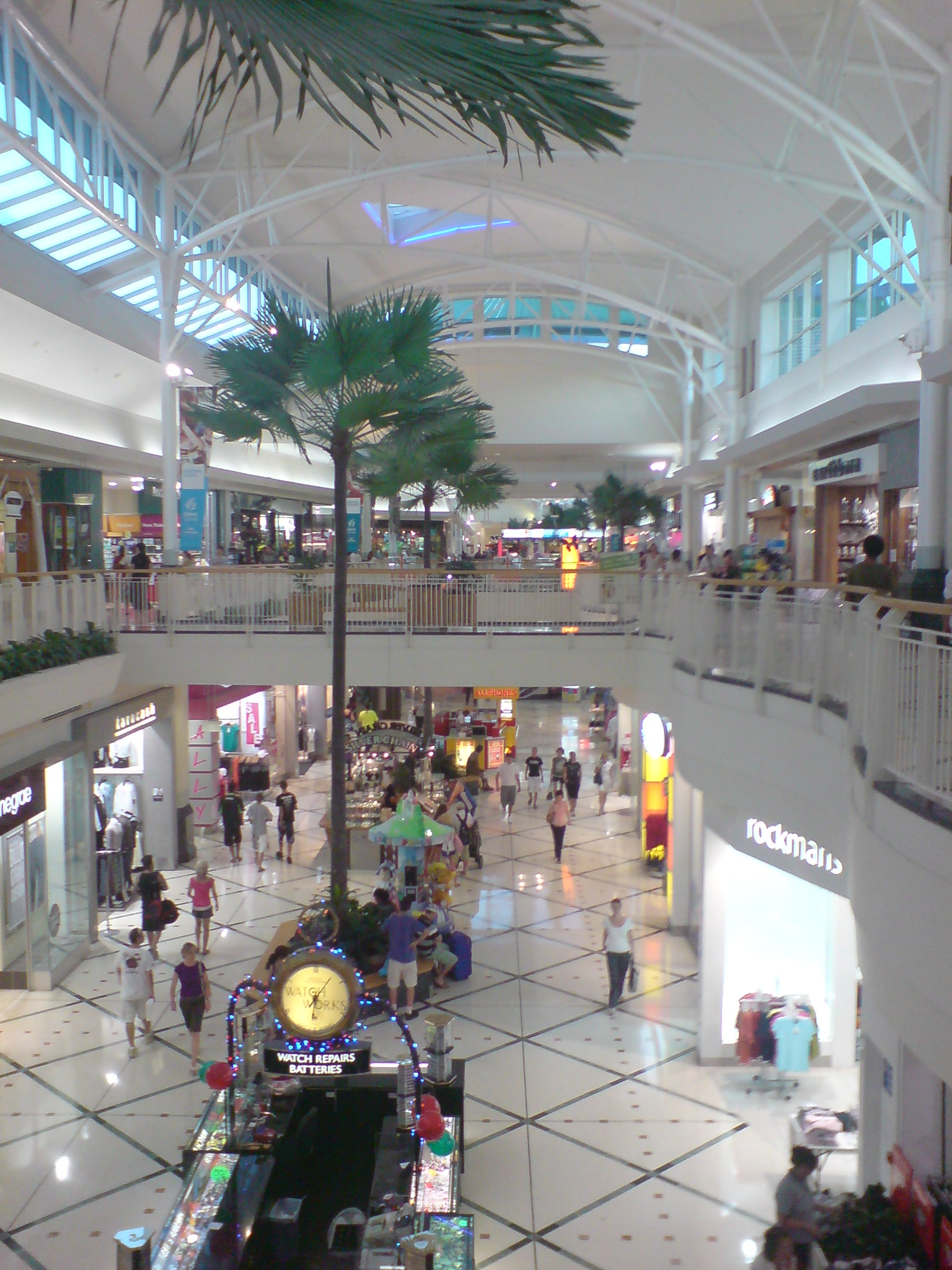
Cairns Central in the evening

== See also ==
- List of shopping centres in Australia
