= Chillagoe Railway and Mining Co. =

Australian railway and mining company

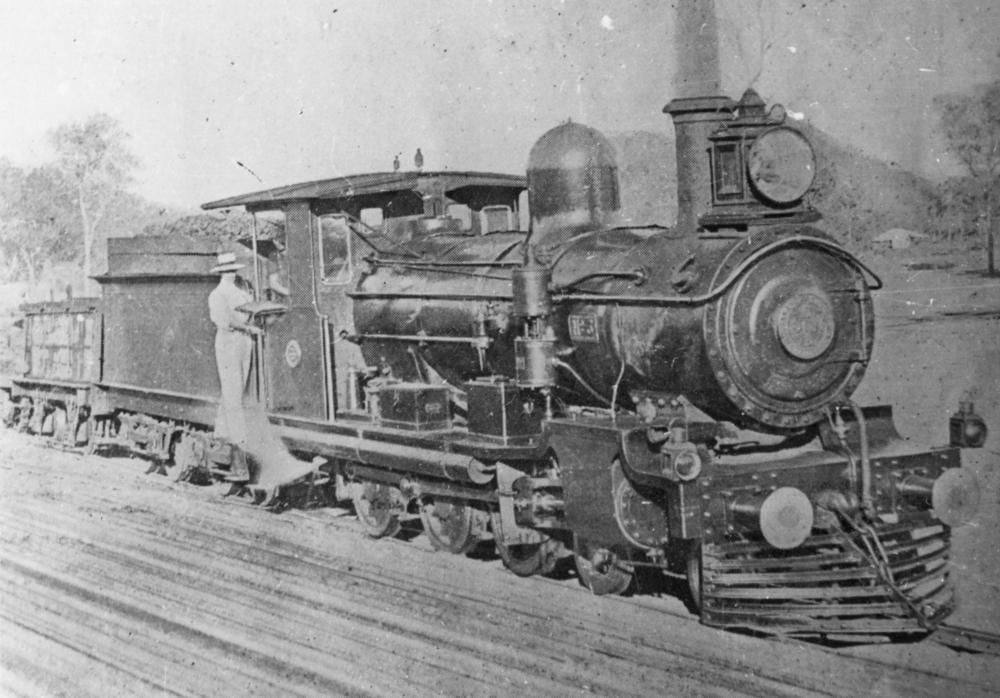
Locomotive no. 3 of the Chillagoe Railway was the first engine on the Etheridge line

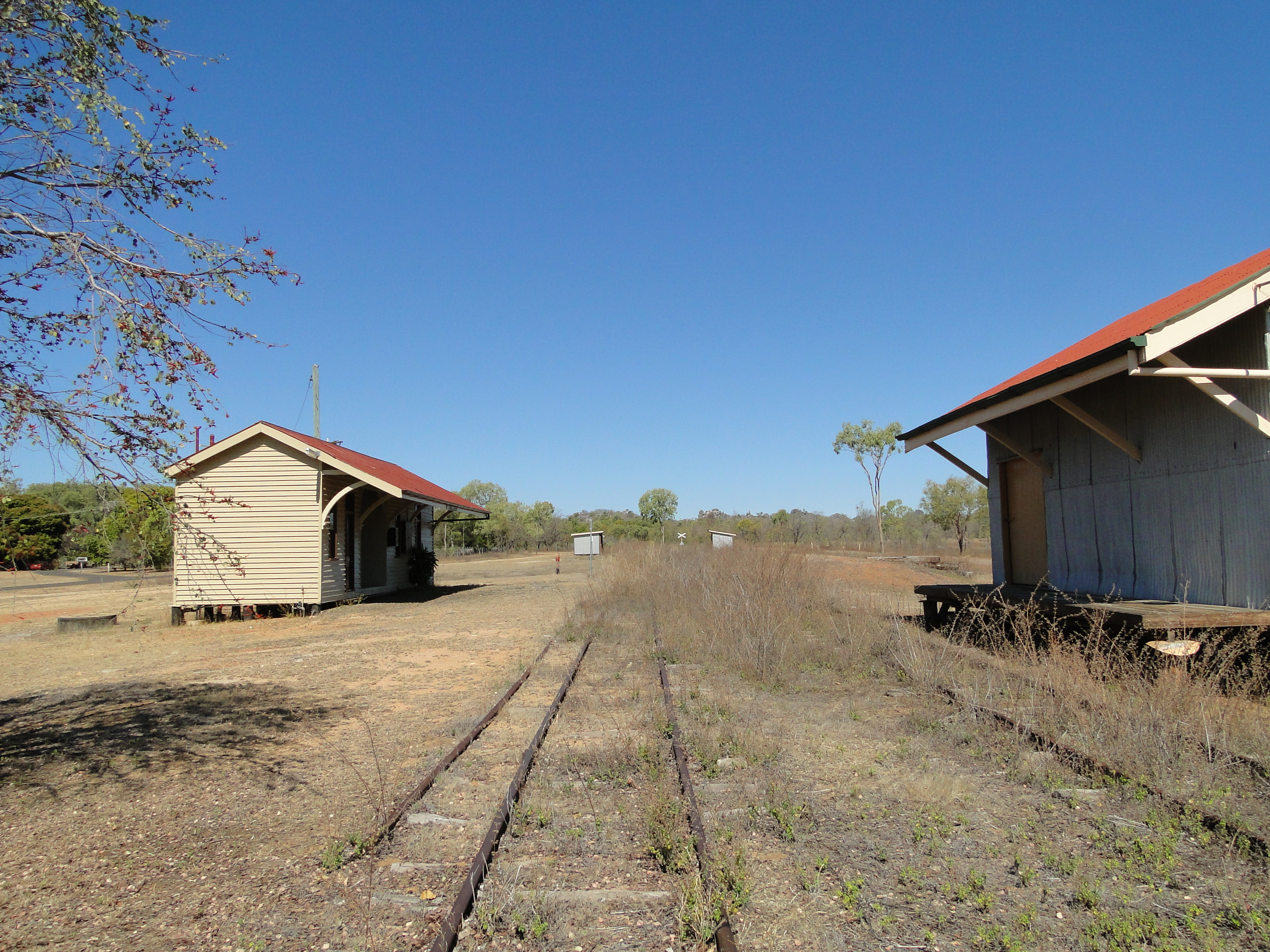
Chillago Railway Station, 2014

The Chillagoe Railway and Mining Company was an Australian business established in 1897 initially under the name Chillagoe Proprietary. Its initial purpose was to build a railway to the town of Chillagoe, Queensland to support the development of mining. In 1898, the company was recapitalised as the Chillagoe Railway and Mining Company.

== History ==
In the search and prospecting for copper outcrops in the North Queensland Tablelands area, several copper outcrops were discovered on William Atherton’s cattle property called “Chillagoe”. This was in 1887 by two prospectors acting on behalf of John Moffat, the Scotsman, who was to build a vast mining empire in the north Queensland. After investing a considerable fortune in the district, Moffat realised that he did not have sufficient capital to exploit the Chillagoe deposits and in 1893 formed a syndicate with C.W. Chapman and J. S. Reid. Together they formed the Chillagoe Proprietary Limited and approached the Queensland Government with a proposal to extend its Cairns Railway to the mining leases.

The Queensland Government however, although sympathetic, was not prepared to spend money on a mining railway in the aftermath of the financial crash of the Queensland National Bank. The proposal was declined, but the company was eventually authorised under the provisions of The Mareeba to Chillagoe Railway Act of 1897 to construct the railway line. One provision was for Chapman, Reid and Moffat to transfer all their rights and obligations in regard to the railway, and their mineral leases, to a company reformed in Melbourne, Victoria in 1899 known as The Chillagoe Railway & Mines Ltd, with a capital of £1,000,000.

== Construction of the railways ==
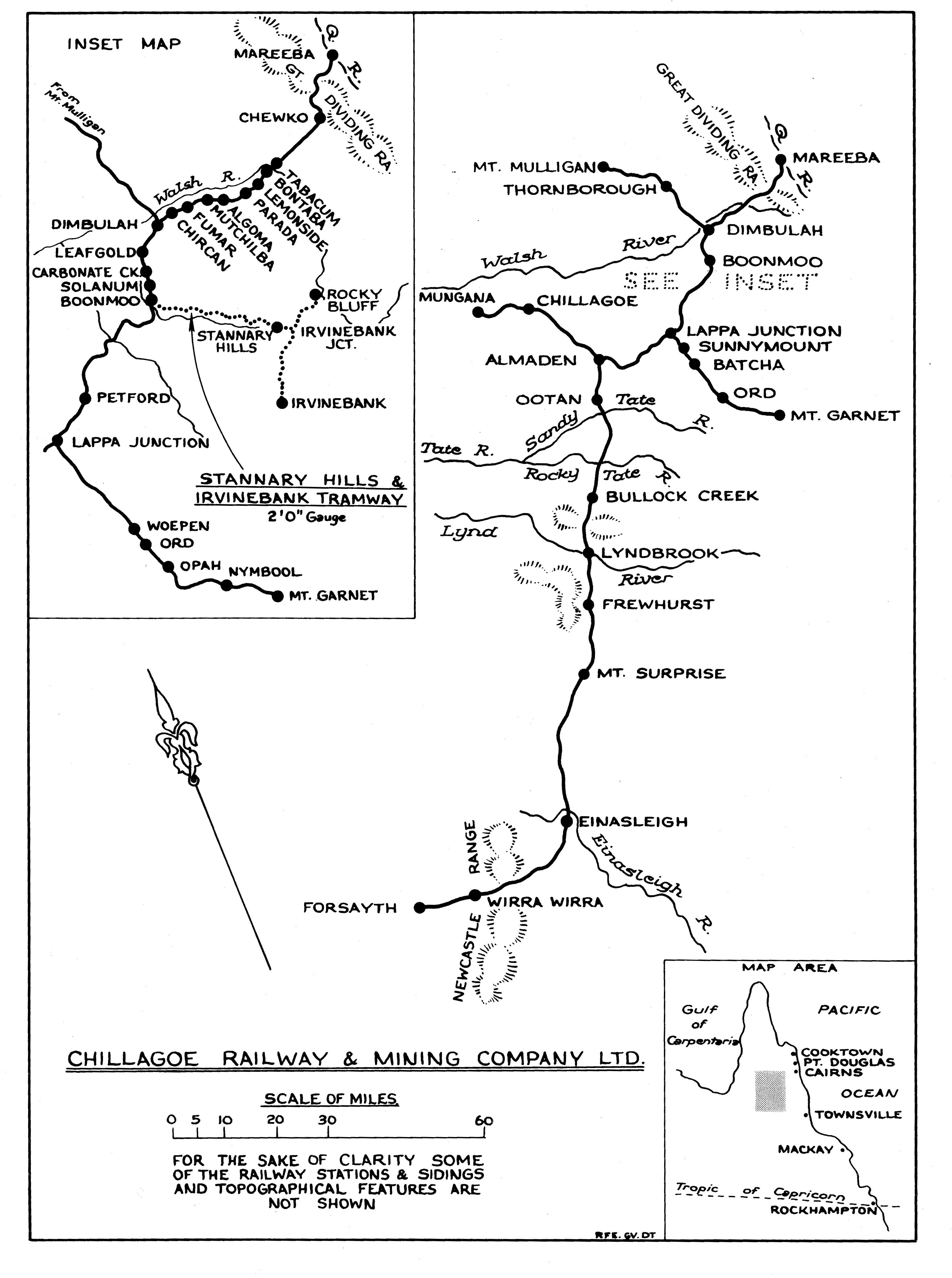
Chillagoe Railway and Mining Co railway map

Construction of the first section of the Chillagoe Railway & Mining Co (Chillagoe Co). was the main line from Mareeba to Lappa Lappa (later Lappa Junction, then simply Lappa) commenced in 1898 and the 55 miles were opened on 1 October 1900 though public traffic had been worked to Lappa prior to this date at owner's risk. The line was extended through Almaden to Chillagoe (completed about June 1901) and on to Mungana (completed in July 1901). The 47 miles from Lappa to Mungana being officially opened for traffic on 2 August 1901.

The Lappa Junction to Mount Garnet railway commenced in 1901, the first section from Lappa Junction to Ord. The 16 1/2 miles being opened for traffic by the contractors Wilcox and Overend on 16 November 1901. The remaining 16 miles from Ord to Mt. Garnet were completed and opened by the contractors on 29 April 1902, once again public traffic had been worked over the line prior to the official opening. The first 10 miles of this line were owned by Chillagoe Co. but the remaining 22 1/2 miles were the property of the Mt. Garnet Freehold Mining Co. notwithstanding that the whole line was worked by the Chillagoe Co.

After a number of proposals had been made for the route of a railway to the Etheridge field, construction of the Etheridge Railway finally commenced in 1906 from Almaden to Mount Surprise on the Mareeba to Chillagoe line. The railway was opened to Mount Surprise in May 1908, and through to Einasleigh on 8 February 1909, a total of 101 miles. The final 41 miles from Einasleigh to Forsayth were not opened until 5 February 1911, construction having proceeded slowly due to union unrest and uncertainty within the mining industry generally.

The company bought six B15 class locomotives between 1900 and 1909.

The line was taken over by the Queensland Government in 1919.

== See also ==
- List of tramways in Queensland
