= Cumberland, Queensland =

Cumberland Queensland
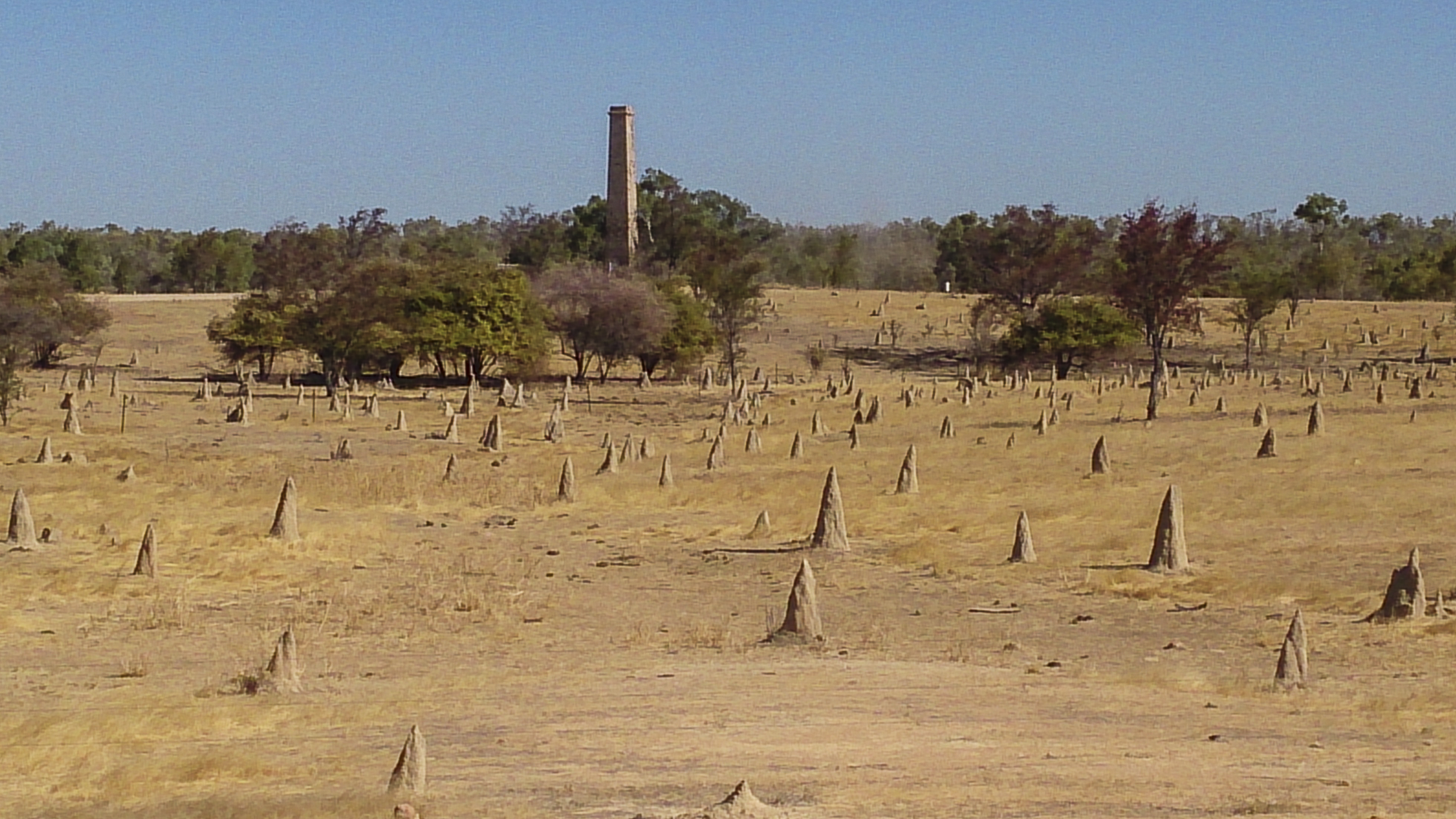
- Chimney from the Cumberland Battery, Sept 2015

- Coordinates: 18.2966°S 143.3514°E
- Postcode(s): 4871
- Location: 21.3 km (13 mi) W of Georgetown (town); 398 km (247 mi) WSW of Cairns; 564 km (350 mi) WNW of Townsville; 1,826 km (1,135 mi) NNW of Brisbane
- LGA(s): Shire of Etheridge

Cumberland is a ghost town in the rural locality of Georgetown within the Shire of Etheridge in Queensland, Australia. It is located approximately 20 kilometres (12 mi) west of the town of Georgetown on the Gulf Developmental Road.

== History ==
=== Boom ===
Cumberland was born when gold was discovered there in 1872 and the first prospecting claim was registered in that same year. By 1878, it was one of the major producers of gold in the Etheridge goldfield. The Cumberland Company dammed nearby Cumberland Creek to create a permanent water supply for the township. A battery and cyanide plant was built by the creek in 1880.

The town site was surveyed in June 1882 by T.R. Geraghty.

High levels of gold production continued through the 1880s peaking in 1886, and the town grew to a population of about 400 people. In 1885 a police station and telegraph station were established. Cumberland Post Office opened on 3 April 1885 and closed in 1929. Both the Queensland Government Savings Bank and the Bank of New South Wales opened branch offices in 1887. The township was officially declared in 1889. The school opened in 1891. In 1894 there were four hotels.

In 1891 a tramway 800 metres long was built to transport the ore from the mine to the battery. To ensure a steady gradient for the heavy ore trucks, the tramway required cutting, embanking and bridges, which made it very expensive to build.

=== Bust ===
By the 1890s, the easily obtained gold had been removed and a cyanide treatment plant was built to extract gold from the tailings.

The mine and tramway closed in 1897 and the population decreased from that time. In 1899 the telegraph station closed and only one hotel remained. By 1900 the mine had produced 2,474 kg of gold at an average of 72 grams per tonne. In 1901 only 106 people remained in the town.

In 1901, Cumberland made the headline for the "Cumberland Poisoning Case". On 20 November 1901, two men, John "Scotty" Wilson and Edward Hollywood, were drinking at the hotel and then entered one of the bedrooms where they found a beer bottle and drank from it. Unfortunately it contained muriatic acid. Both men were taken to Georgetown Hospital, where Hollywood died on 22 November and Wilson on 24 November. The police found there were no suspicious circumstances.

The school closed in 1915, while the post office and the last remaining hotel closed in 1930. John Williamson was one of the last remaining residents, continuing cyanide extraction into the 1940s.

== Present day ==
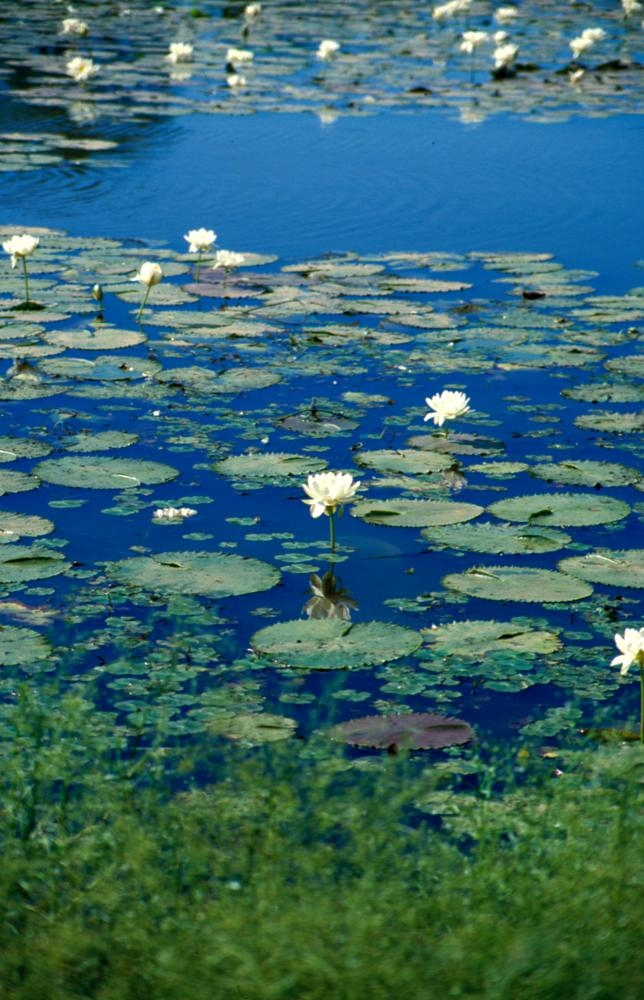
Water lilies in Cumberland Dam

Only the square brick chimney from the Cumberland Battery remains as a memory of this town.

Today there is a rest area which can be used by overnight campers. A popular activity is bird-watching on the lagoon created by the dam.

== See also ==
- List of tramways in Queensland
