= Lappa, Queensland =

Lappa
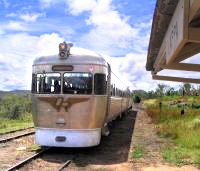
- The Savannahlander at Lappa Junction, April 2006

- Coordinates: 17°22′S 144°53′E
- Country: Australia
- State: Queensland
- LGA: Shire of Mareeba
- Location: 86 km (53 mi) SW of Mareeba; 147 km (91 mi) SW of Cairns; 1,813 km (1,127 mi) NW of Brisbane

Government
  - State electorate: Cook
  - Federal division: Kennedy
- Postcode: 4871

Lappa is a former railway town on the western side of the Atherton Tablelands near Petford in the Shire of Mareeba in Far North Queensland, Australia.

== Geography ==
Lappa is on the Burke Developmental Road which runs roughly east to west to the immediate north of the town. To the south of the town is the Lappa railway station which is on the Savannahlander route. Heading south is the road to Mount Garnet. The Lappa-Mount Garnet Road which was formerly a train line (which closed in 1961), which was built following Abdul Wade's camel track and is today a popular 4 wheel drive and mountain biking trail.

== History ==
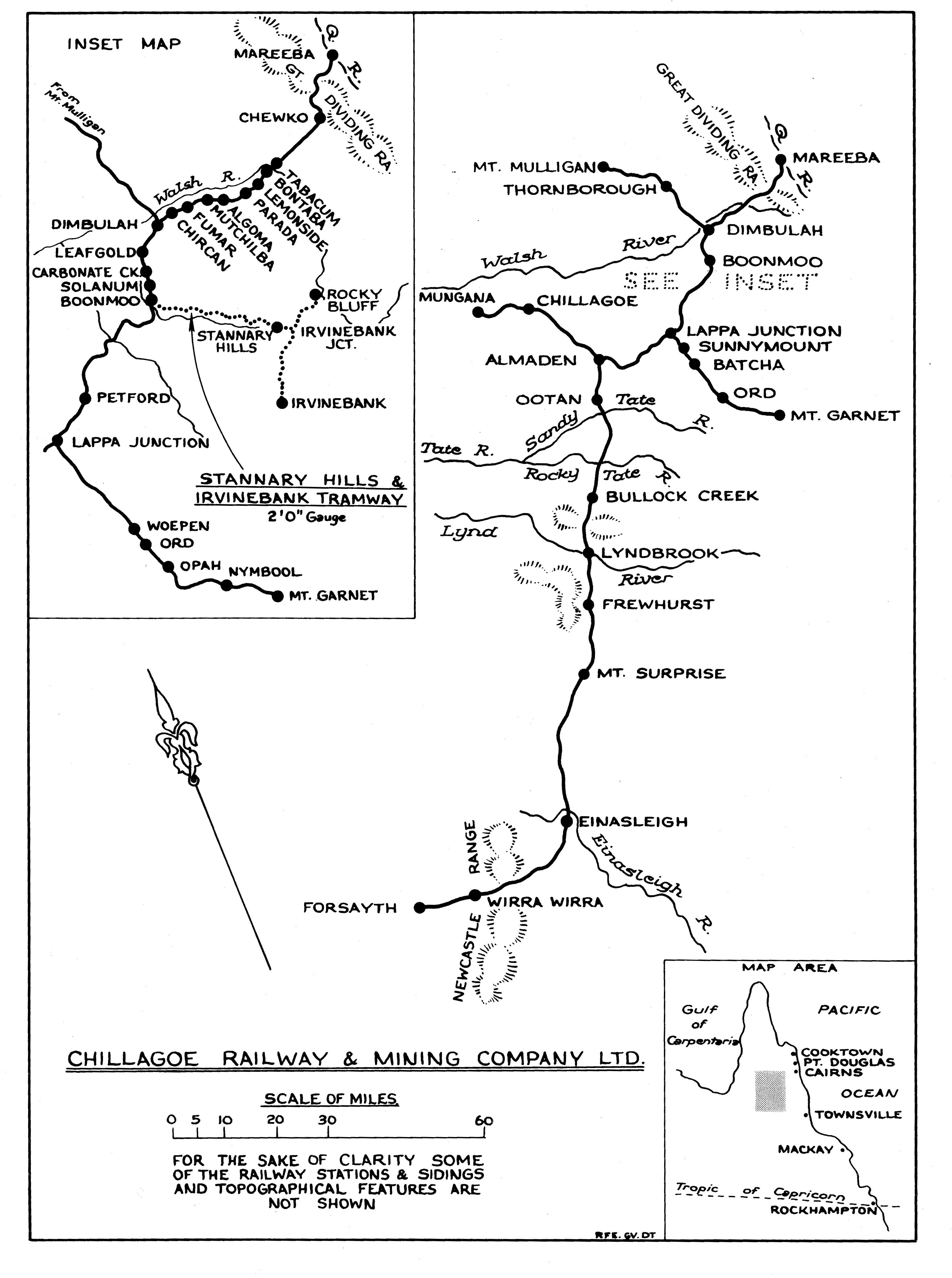
Chillagoe Railway and Mining Co. railway map

Silver was discovered in the area in 1891 by the Halpin Brothers.

The town has had several name changes in its relatively short existence. Originally named Lappa Lappa by Queensland Railways after the nearby silver, lead and zinc mines this name is the Aboriginal name for a large rock bluff there. One of the Lappa's was dropped over the years but then Lappa Junction became the local name and survived until 1943 it was shortened to Lappa once more.

The Loch Lomond State School opened on 25 July 1900 but was subsequently renamed Lappa Lappa State School. The school closed 1902.

The Chillagoe branch railway line was a private railway built for the Chillagoe Railway and Mining Company. Starting at Mareeba, the line reached Lappa Junction on 1 October 1900 and was subsequently extended to Mungana. It was taken over the Queensland Government in 1919.

In 1904, the population was 200–300 men.

== Heritage buildings ==
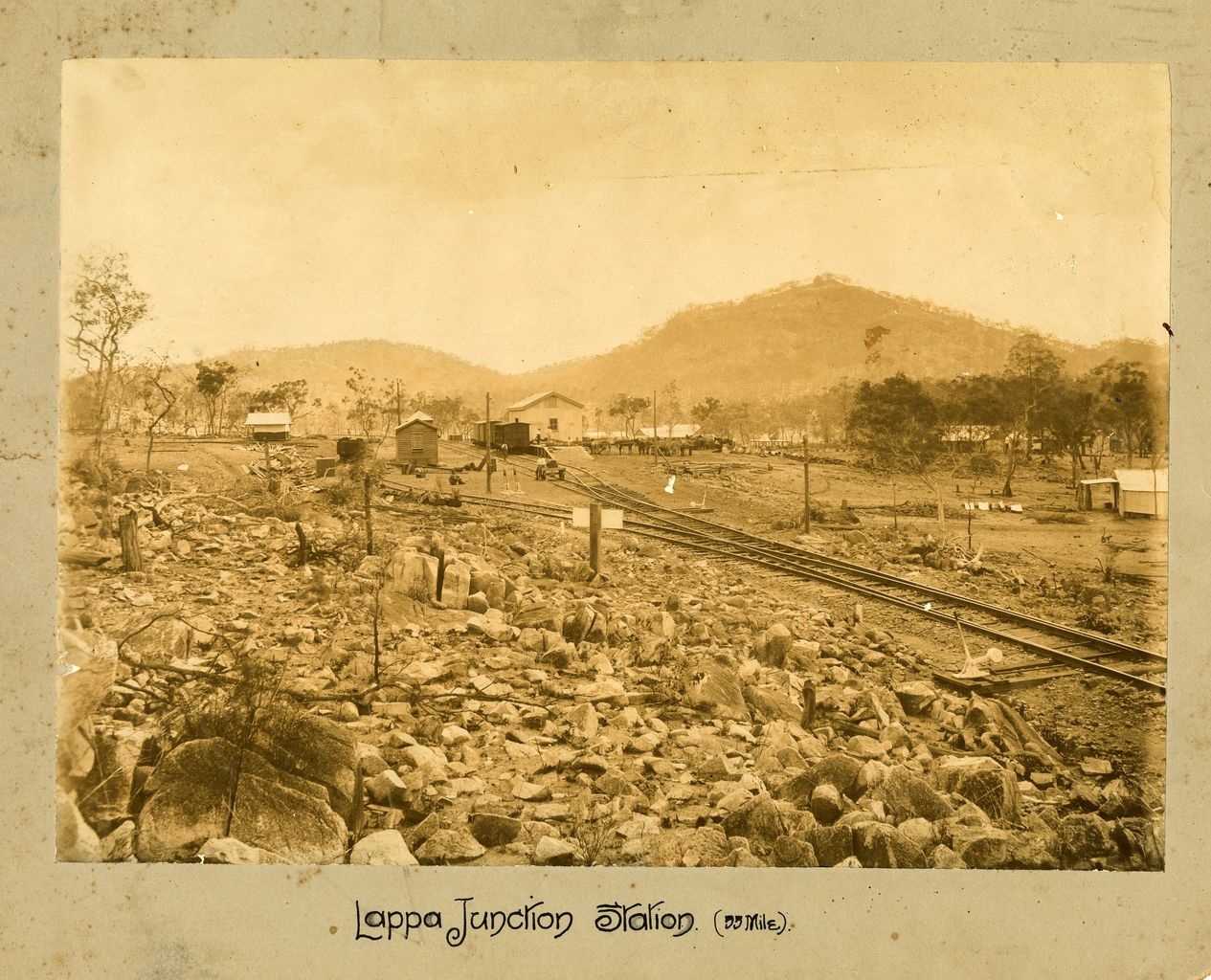
Lappa Junction railway station, circa 1900

Three main buildings remain at Lappa. The oldest is the Lappa Railway Station built by William Hastie and opened at Lappa in November 1900. By 1901 there were two hotels at Lappa, Thomas Dillon's and Isabella Waltons. Waltons is the one that survives today. It was the Family Hotel run by A E Williams in 1908/9 and by Mary Gordon 1909/10.Ysidro Barbera a Spaniard bought the hotel in 1910 and changed the name to Espanol Hotel. Fred Winters ran the hotel for four months before dying on 20 March 1921. Vida Leonard and her family ran the Espanol from 1923 until it closed in 1966. The hotel license was surrendered in December 1966. The old kitchen remains behind the hotel. The Espanol Hotel today is a BYO pub and museum. The Espanol Hotel is listed on the Mareeba Shire's local heritage register.

The third building is the Almaden Church which was built in 1900 at Almaden and moved to Lappa in the early 1940s. It was built onto and serves as the main house.
