= Savannahlander =

Australian passenger train service

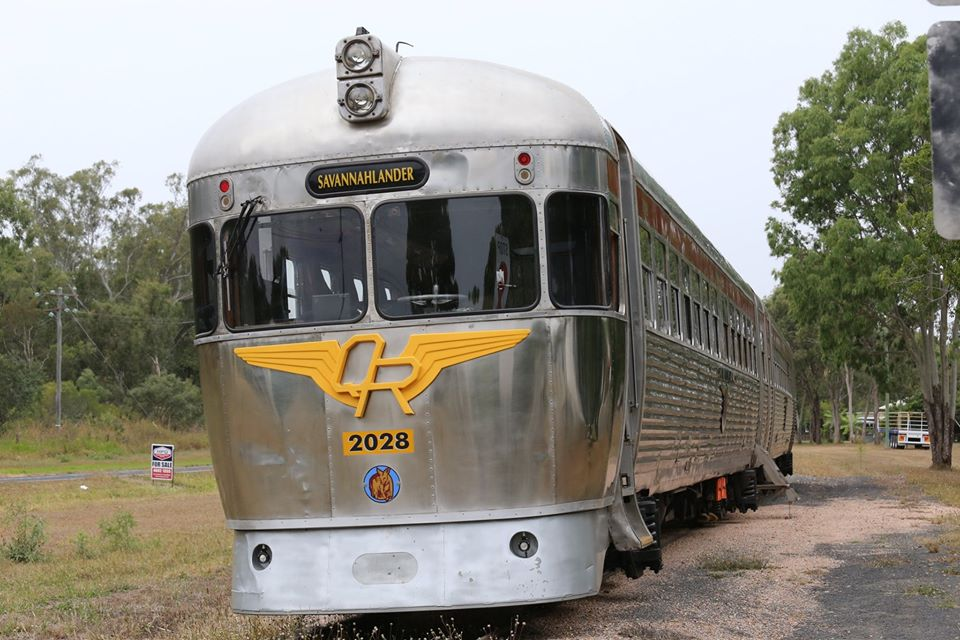
- The Savannahlander stopped at Mutchilba to pick up the staff, 2020

Overview
- Service type: Passenger train
- Predecessor: Forsayth Mixed
- First service: 3 April 1995
- Current operator: Cairns Kuranda Steam Pty Ltd.
- Former operator: Queensland Rail

Route
- Termini: Cairns; Forsayth
- Distance travelled: 424 km
- Average journey time: Four days
- Service frequency: Weekly
- Lines used: Tablelands railway, Etheridge Railway

Technical
- Rolling stock: 2000 Class Railmotors
- Track owner: Queensland Rail

The Savannahlander is an Australian passenger train service, primarily serving tourists, that operates in Far North Queensland. It travels on the Tablelands railway line (including the former Etheridge railway line) from the coastal city of Cairns to Forsayth.

== History ==
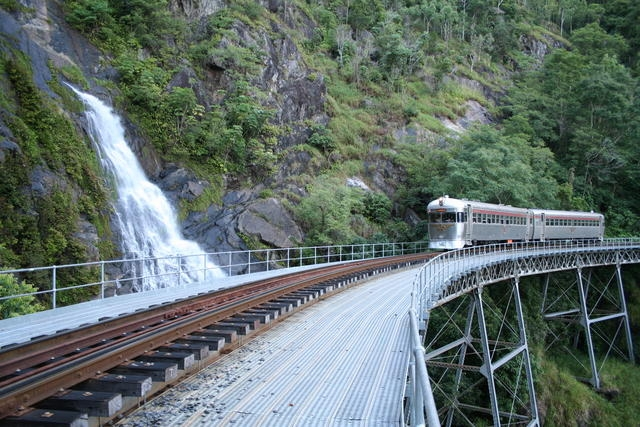
The Savannahlander at Stoney Creek Falls, April 2005

The service was introduced by Queensland Rail on 3 April 1995 to replace the Forsayth Mixed (marketed as the "Last Great Train Ride"). At the same time, the line from Mareeba to Mount Surprise was closed. The Savannahlander service was initially run with a 2000 class railmotor set that had been refurbished at the Townsville Workshops. It originally ran on the Mount Surprise to Forsayth section of the Etheridge line. However, in September 1998, after an upgrade of the line for sugar syrup trains from Cairns to Arriga, and limited restoration of the rest of the line, the service began travelling from Cairns to Forsayth.

In 2004, it was decided to contract the service out to a private operator, Cairns Kuranda Steam Pty Ltd. While primarily a passenger service between Cairns and Forsayth, the train can be chartered by large groups.

On 27 March 2019, a car collided with the Savannahlander at a level crossing in the city of Cairns. The driver of the car failed to give way at the crossing and was injured in the crash.

Since 2022, damage to the railway line and its bridges due to floods and bushfires has resulted in some sections of the route being provided by coach travel instead of rail travel.

Starting in the 2025 season, the Savannahlander has been isolated from the Queensland Rail network due to track damage between Kuranda and Koah. All services are operated from Mareeba with road coaches provided from Cairns.

== Route and timetable ==
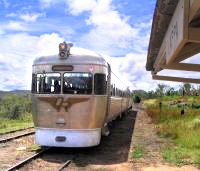
The Savannahlander at Lappa Junction, April 2006

Running for 39 weeks in the year, The Savannahlander departs Cairns railway station (16.9257°S 145.7712°E) at 06:30 Wednesday mornings and travels up the scenic Kuranda Range past the Barron Falls (16.8364°S 145.6429°E) to Kuranda (16.8191°S 145.6391°E). It then travels to the south-west on the Chillagoe-Mungana branch line. The train travels through the towns of Mareeba (16.9938°S 145.4213°E) and Dimbulah (17.1500°S 145.1106°E) before passing through Lappa Junction (17.3591°S 144.8861°E) and arriving in Almaden (17.3384°S 144.6780°E) where it stays for the night.

On Thursday mornings, the Savannahlander continues south-west on the Etheridge Railway. It passes through Mount Surprise (18.1468°S 144.3179°E) and Einasleigh (18.5140°S 144.0917°E) before terminating at Forsayth railway station (18.5869°S 143.6028°E). On Fridays, the train departs Forsayth for Mount Surprise. The train then departs for Cairns on Saturday mornings.

== Rolling stock ==
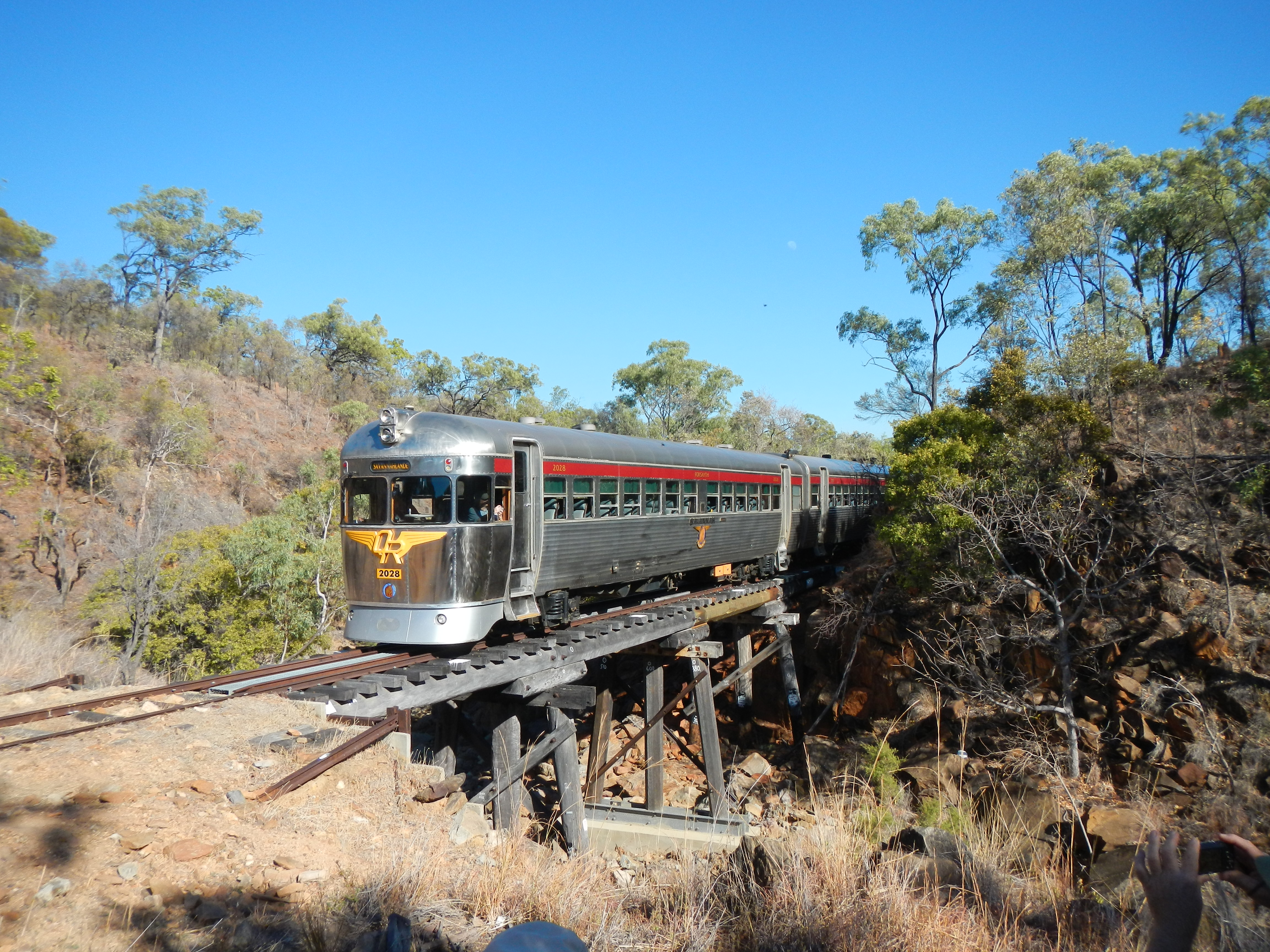
Crossing a wooden trestle bridge on the Tablelands Line, June 2013

The Savannahlander comprises three former two-car Queensland Railways 2000 class rail motors. Two (2026 and 2028) are "PD" (Passenger / Driving) cars. They were built for Queensland Rail in 1963, and have the classic 1960s-era streamlined front ends. Originally, they were fitted with 160 hp (119 kW) Rolls-Royce diesel engines.

The third (2053) is a 2051-class rail motor, built in 1971, known as a "PLDT" (Passenger & Luggage / Driving / Trailing) car. It has access doors at each end, rather than a streamlined front, which allowed it to be placed in the middle of other sets, so that sets of three or four cars could be formed. Only four of that style of car were built, and they were originally fitted with an AEC engine. It was re-engined in 2005, along with the other Savannahlander units.

All units were re-engined with 250 hp (186 kW) Cummins diesel engines. As well as the new engines, the units were fitted with new Allison gearboxes.

== See also ==
- List of named passenger trains of Australia
- Gulflander
- Kuranda Scenic Railway
