= Forsayth, Queensland =

Forsayth
- Town
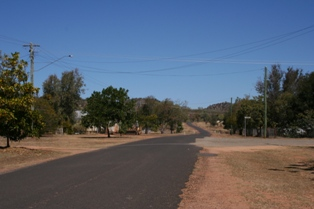
- Forsayth, outback north Queensland

- Interactive map of Forsayth
- Coordinates: 18.5891°S 143.6036°E
- Country: Australia
- State: Queensland
- LGA: Shire of Etheridge
- Location: 40.5 km (25.2 mi) S of Georgetown; 417 km (259 mi) SW of Cairns; 584 km (363 mi) NW of Townsville; 1,851 km (1,150 mi) NNW of Brisbane
- Established: 1871

Government
  - State electorate: Traeger
  - Federal division: Kennedy

Area
  - Total: 3,701.5 km^{2} (1,429.2 sq mi)

Population
  - Total: 107 (2021 census)
  - Density: 0.02891/km^{2} (0.0749/sq mi)
- Time zone: UTC+10:00 (AEST)
- Postcode: 4871
- Mean max temp: 32.6 °C (90.7 °F)
- Mean min temp: 18.4 °C (65.1 °F)
- Annual rainfall: 819.2 mm (32.25 in)
Localities around Forsayth
Georgetown	Georgetown	Einasleigh
Northhead	Forsayth	Einasleigh
Gilberton	Gilberton	Lyndhurst

Forsayth is a rural town and locality in the Shire of Etheridge, Queensland, Australia. In the 2021 census, the locality of Forsayth had a population of 107 people.

== Geography ==
Forsayth is in Far North Queensland approximately 415 kilometres (258 mi) by road from Cairns.

The town is the terminus of the Etheridge Railway.

== History ==
Jangga, also known as Yangga, is a language of Central Queensland. The Jangga language region includes the landscape within the local government boundaries of the Etheridge Shire Council.

Originally known as Finnigan's Camp after the prospector who discovered gold nearby in 1871, within a year the settlement had become Charleston township, and it continued to grow despite near desertion when its inhabitants rushed to the Palmer River Goldfield in 1874 and to the Hodgkinson in 1876. Charleston Post Office opened on 1 February 1876, was renamed Charleston West in 1910 and closed in 1915. After a slump in the mid-1880s the township was again a flourishing centre by the mid-1890s, having five hotels, a school and a court of petty sessions.

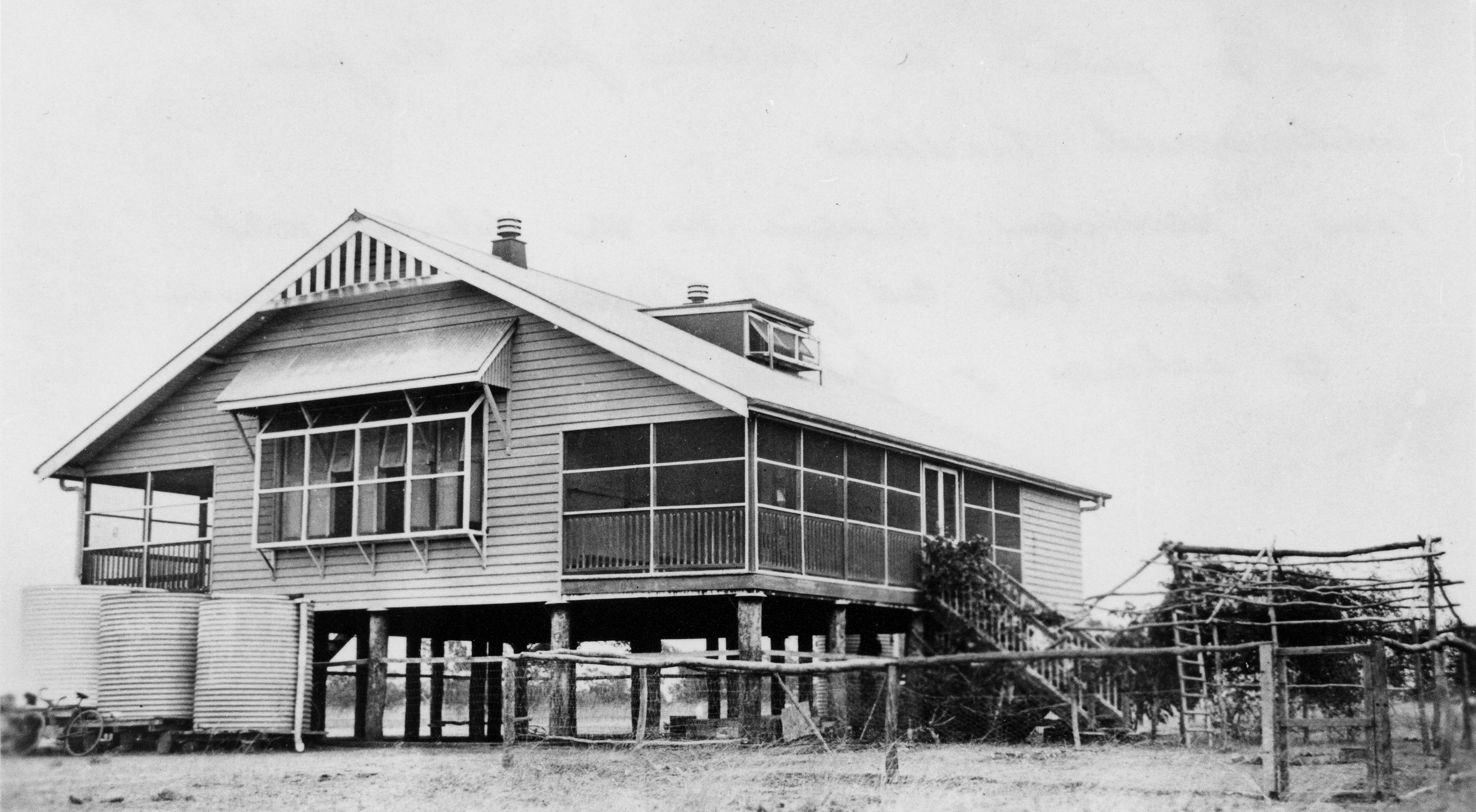
Forsayth State School, 1922

Charleston Provisional School opened on 4 March 1895. On 1 January 1909 it became Charleston State School. In 1920 it was renamed Forsayth State School.

By the late 1890s base metal prices were high: a number of promising copper deposits were opened up in the Etheridge district at Charleston, Einasleigh and Ortona, and several were acquired by a subsidiary of the Chillagoe Company. This led the company to commence a rail link in 1907 from Almaden to Einasleigh and the Charleston area, which was completed in January 1910. The Etheridge Railway terminated at a new settlement on the other side of the Delaney River. First known as New Charleston, it was renamed Forsayth after the railways commissioner, James Forsyth Thallon. During the year, all the buildings in Charleston, including the police station and the school, which had previously been at Gilberton, were moved across the Delaney River to Forsayth.

The second Charleston Post Office opened here by April 1910 and was renamed Forsayth in December 1910. New buildings and services followed the opening of the railway; these included a hospital, a new court house and a new school built in 1912, and a public hall built two years later.

In 1914 the Chillagoe smelters were shut down and the town's importance as an ore-loading facility and centre for miners and their families declined as mining activity in the area was scaled back.

Wirra Wirra Provisional School opened in 1914 as a tent school (a simple structure with canvas walls). On 1 December 1914, it became Wirra Wirra State School. It closed circa 1918. It was on a 3-acre (1.2 ha) land parcel on Wirra Wirra Road near the Wirra Wirra railway station (18.61770°S 143.76653°E).

Queensland Railways took the railway line over in 1918.

Forsayth remained the railhead for transport to the west, although plans in the 1930s to extend the railway to connect to the Normanton-Croydon railway did not proceed. From the 1980s, renewed mining activity in the area and increased livestock traffic revived the town.

The Cobbold Gorge Nature Reserve was established in 2009.

== Demographics ==
In the 2006 census, the locality of Forsayth had a population of 101 people.

In the 2011 census, the locality of Forsayth had a population of 347 people.

In the 2016 census, the locality of Forsayth had a population of 129 people.

In the 2021 census, the locality of Forsayth had a population of 107 people.

== Heritage listings ==
Forsayth has a number of heritage-listed sites, including:

- Station Master's Residence, Fourth Street
- Forsayth railway station, Etheridge railway line

== Economy ==
Forsayth is a service centre for road transport and regional tourism.

== Amenities ==
The Forsayth branch of the Queensland Country Women's Association has its QCWA Hall in Fourth Street.

St Augustine of Canterbury Church is shared by the Anglican and Catholic communities. It is on the corner of Third and Fourth Streets. It is within the Gulf Savannah Parish of the Roman Catholic Diocese of Cairns.

== Education ==
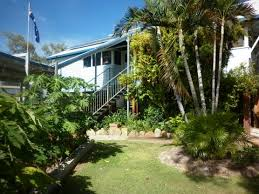
Forsayth State School, 2025

Forsayth State School is a government primary (Early Childhood to Year 6) school for boys and girls at Third Street (18.5897°S 143.6025°E). In 2014, the school had an enrolment of 8 students with 2 teachers. In 2018, the school had an enrolment of 9 students with 2 teachers and 4 non-teaching staff (2 full-time equivalent).

There are no nearby secondary schools. The alternatives are distance education and boarding school.

== Attractions ==
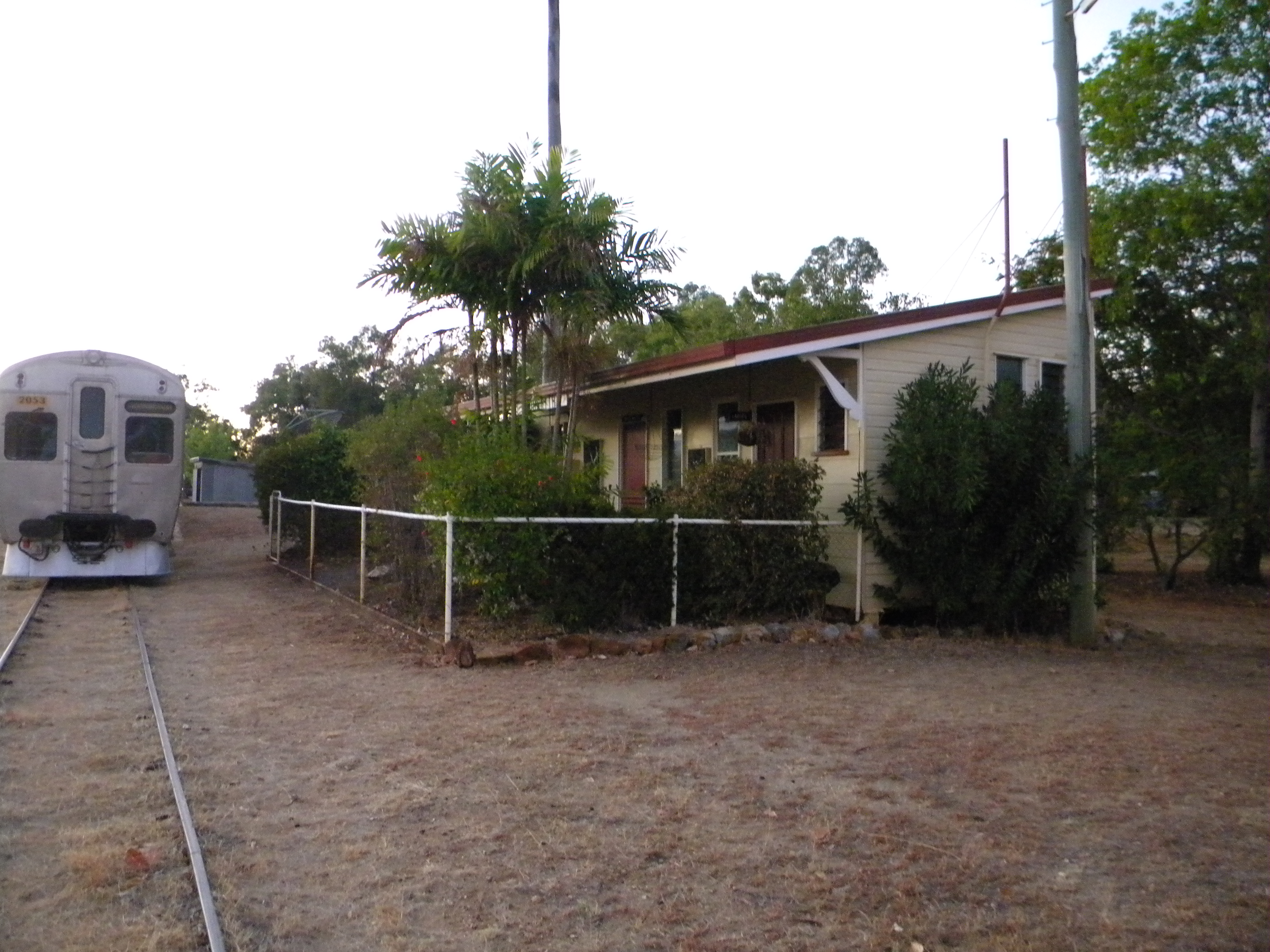
Savannahlander at Forsayth railway station, 2013

Forsayth is now serviced by a weekly, privately operated, tourist train, The Savannahlander.

Cobbold Gorge is a 4,720-hectare (47.2 km^{2}) nature reserve offering a range of ecotourism experiences.
