= Shire of Etheridge =

Coordinates: 18°17′27″S 143°32′52″E

- Local government area
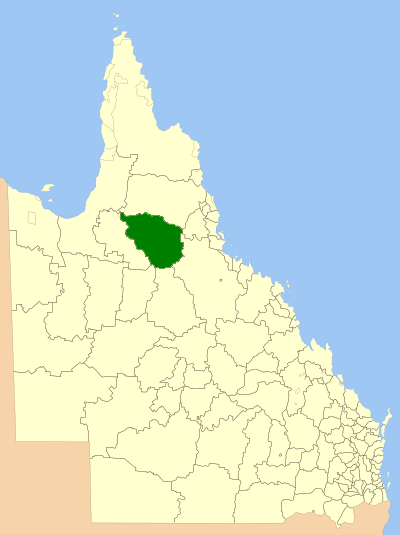
- Location within Queensland

- Interactive map of Shire of Etheridge
- Country: Australia
- State: Queensland
- Region: Far North Queensland
- Established: 1879
- Council seat: Georgetown

Government
  - Mayor: Barry Gilbert Hughes
  - State electorate: Traeger
  - Federal division: Kennedy

Area
  - Total: 39,199 km^{2} (15,135 sq mi)

Population
  - Total: 714 (2021 census)
  - Density: 0.018215/km^{2} (0.04718/sq mi)
- Website: Shire of Etheridge
LGAs around Shire of Etheridge
| Carpentaria | Mareeba | Tablelands |
| Croydon | Shire of Etheridge | Charters Towers |
| Richmond | Flinders | Charters Towers |

The Shire of Etheridge is a local government area in Far North Queensland, Australia in what is known as the Savannah Gulf region. Its economy is based on cattle grazing and mining.

It covers an area of 39,199 square kilometres (15,134.8 sq mi), and has existed as a local government entity since 1882.

In the 2021 census, the Shire of Etheridge had a population of 714 people.

== History ==
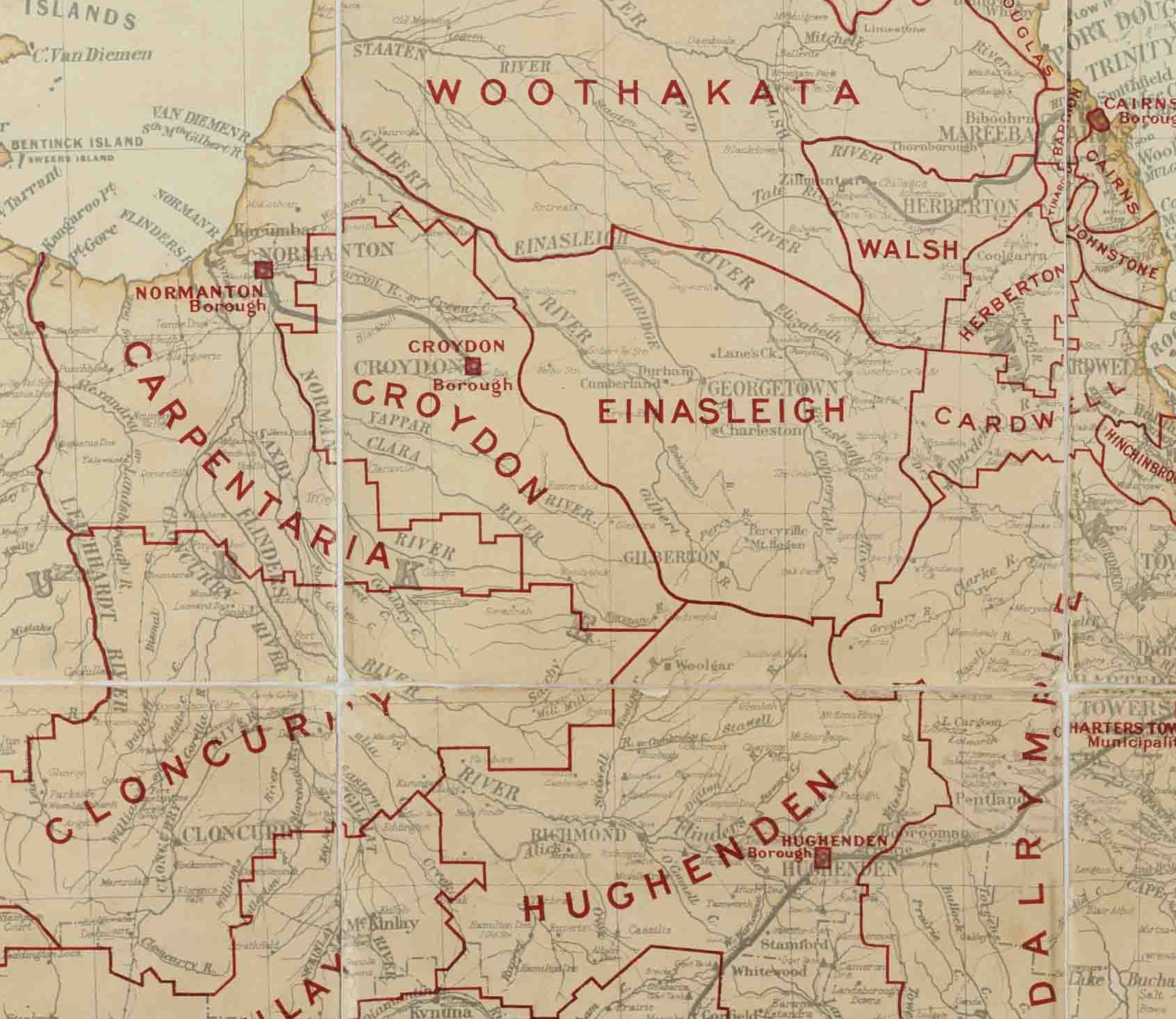
Map of Einasleigh Division and adjacent local government areas, March 1902

The Einasleigh Division was created on 11 November 1879 as one of 74 divisions around Queensland under the Divisional Boards Act 1879 with a population of 720. In 1891 it was reported that the divisional board had made no progress, perhaps because it covered a large area that was sparsely settled.

With the passage of the Local Authorities Act 1902, Einasleigh Division became the Shire of Einasleigh on 31 March 1903.

On 15 March 1919, it was renamed Shire of Etheridge.

== Towns and localities ==
The Shire of Etheridge includes the following settlements:

- Georgetown
- Einasleigh
- Forsayth
- Gilbert River
- Mount Surprise
- Abingdon Downs
- Conjuboy
- Gilberton
- Lyndhurst
- Northhead
- Strathmore
- Talaroo

=== Former towns and localities ===
The Etheridge Shire had many mines in the late 1800s. This gave rise to a number of communities that no longer exist today:

- Cumberland within the present-day locality of Georgetown
- Kidston

== Amenities ==
The Etheridge Shire Council operate a public library at Georgetown.

== Demographics ==
| Year | Population | Notes |
|---|---|---|
| 1933 | 1,085 | |
| 1947 | 860 | |
| 1954 | 815 | |
| 1961 | 828 | |
| 1966 | 936 | |
| 1971 | 974 | |
| 1976 | 940 | |
| 1981 | 1,010 | |
| 1986 | 1,210 | |
| 1991 | 1,377 | |
| 1996 | 1,273 | |
| 2001 census | 1,431 | |
| 2006 census | 851 | |
| 2011 census | 893 | |
| 2016 census | 799 | |
| 2021 census | 714 | |

== Chairmen and mayors ==
- 1888: C. Battersby
- 1927: W. H. G. Gard
- 2008–2012: Warren Devlin
- 2012–2016: William Attwood
- 2016–2020: Warren Devlin
- 2020–present: Barry Gilbert Hughes

== Current Council ==
The current council was elected in the 2024 Queensland local election:

| Name | Position |
|---|---|
| Barry Hughes | Mayor |
| Laurell Royes | Deputy Mayor |
| Ian Carroll | |
| Seven Ryan | |
| Ian Tincknell | |
