= Ortona (disambiguation) =

Ortona is a town and municipality in Chieti, Abruzzo, Italy

Ortona may also refer to:

== Geographical ==
- Ortona Lighthouse, in Ortona, Chieti, Abruzzo, Italy
- Basilica of St. Thomas the Apostle, Ortona, also known as Ortona Cathedral, in Ortona, Chieti, Abruzzo, Italy
- Ortona dei Marsi, a commune and town in L'Aquila, Abruzzo, Italy
- Ortona, Latium, a town in ancient Italy
- Ortona, Glades County, Florida, an unincorporated community in the United States
- Ortona Prehistoric Village, an archaeological site in Glades County, Florida, United States
- Ortona Mine and Battery, an historic mine in Queensland, Australia

== Historical ==
- Battle of Ortona, an assault on the town of Ortona, Italy during World War II

== Transportation ==
- SS Ortona, a ship renamed RMS Arcadian in 1910

== Games ==
- Ortona (wargame), a 1983 board wargame simulating the Battle of Ortona
