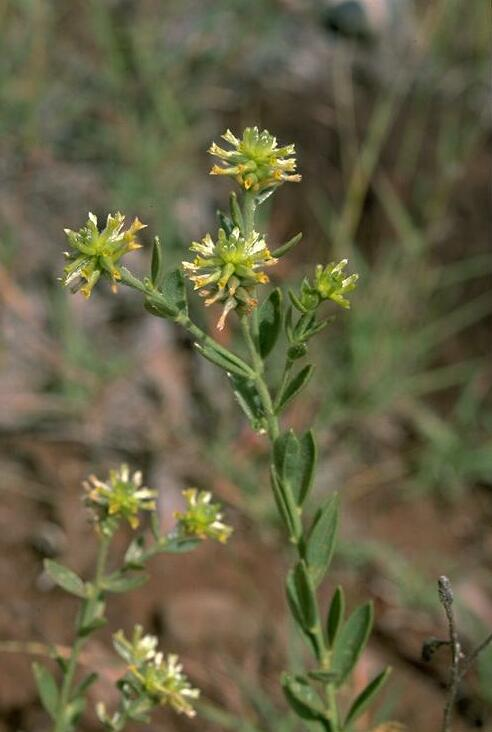

Scientific classification
- Kingdom: Plantae
- Clade: Tracheophytes
- Clade: Angiosperms
- Clade: Eudicots
- Clade: Rosids
- Order: Malvales
- Family: Thymelaeaceae
- Genus: Pimelea
- Species: P. confertiflora

Binomial name
- Pimelea confertiflora A.R.Bean

= Pimelea confertiflora =

Species of shrub

Pimelea confertiflora is a species of flowering plant in the family Thymelaeaceae and is endemic to north Queensland. It is a shrub with densely hairy young stems, elliptic or narrowly elliptic leaves and spikes of yellowish-green or yellow, tube-shaped flowers.

== Description ==
Pimelea confertiflora is a perennial shrub that typically grows to a height of 0.4–1.5 m (1 ft 4 in – 4 ft 11 in) and has young stems densely covered with transparent hairs pressed against the surface. The leaves are arranged more or less in opposite pairs, elliptic or narrowly elliptic, 13–29 mm (0.51–1.14 in) long and 2–6 mm (0.079–0.236 in) wide, on a petiole 0.5–1.2 mm (0.020–0.047 in) long. The leaves are hairy, the hairs on the lower surface longer than those on the upper surface. The flowers are borne in spikes on the ends of branches in clusters of 52 to 130 on a densely hairy rachis 18–55 mm (0.71–2.17 in) long, the peduncle 2–30 mm (0.079–1.181 in) long, each flower on a pedicel 0.3–1 mm (0.012–0.039 in) long. The floral tube is 4.5–6.6 mm (0.18–0.26 in) long and yellowish-green or yellow, the sepals 0.7–1.6 mm (0.028–0.063 in) long and densely hairy on the outside. Flowering occurs in most months.

== Taxonomy ==
Pimelea confertiflora was first formally described in 2017 by Anthony Bean in the journal Austrobaileya from specimens collected by Paul Irwin Forster near Mount Misery in 1990. The specific epithet (confertiflora) means "crowded flowers".

== Distribution and habitat ==
This pimelea grows on hillsides with rocky outcrops between the Windsor Tableland, Undara Volcanic National Park and Mareeba in north Queensland.
