= Quartz Hill Coach Change Station =

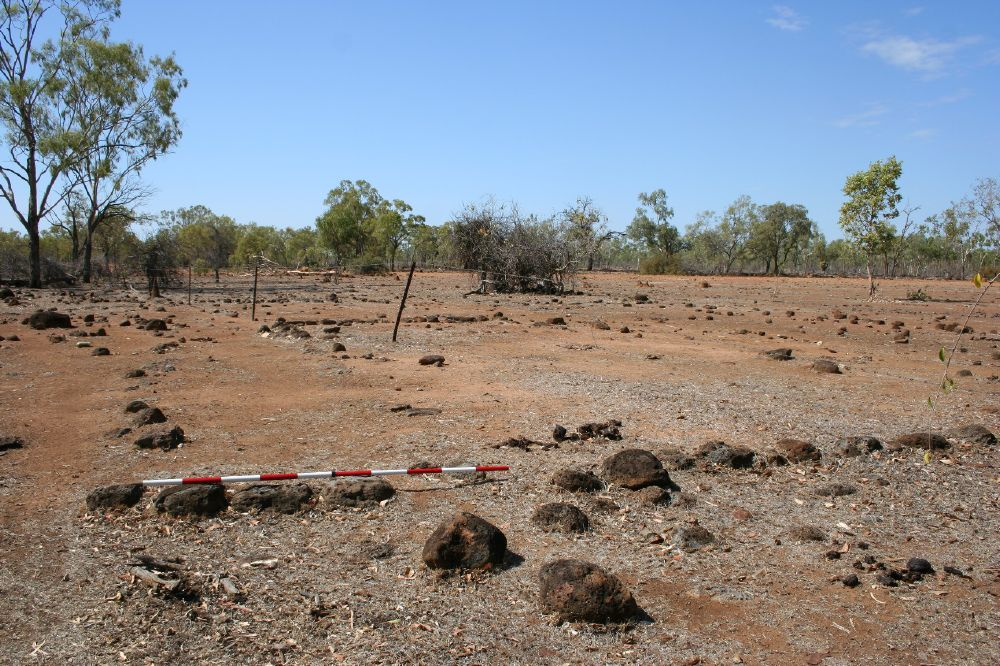
- Remains of the Quartz Hill Coach Change Station

- Location within Queensland Location within Australia
- 18.0938°S 144.2306°E
- Location: Mount Surprise, Shire of Etheridge, Queensland, Australia

History
- Design period: 1870s–1890s (late 19th century)
- Built: 1888–1908

Queensland Heritage Register
- Official name: Quartz Hill Coach Change Station Site and Cemetery
- Type: state heritage (archaeological)
- Designated: 4 July 2006
- Reference no.: 602232
- Significant period: 1888–1908 (historical)
- Significant components: burial site, blazed tree/dig tree/marker tree, dump – bottle, grave surrounds/railings, dump – rubbish, cemetery, headstone, hotel / inn, cairn, track

Quartz Hill Coach Change Station Site and Cemetery is a heritage-listed coach station in Mount Surprise, Shire of Etheridge, Queensland, Australia. It was built from 1888 to 1908. It was added to the Queensland Heritage Register on 4 July 2006.

== History ==
The Quartz Hill Coach Change Station was a product of the development of pastoralism and the discovery of gold, tin, and copper in North Queensland. In 1888 Quartz Hill became an overnight stop on the "coast to coast" coach transport and mail routes from the east coast (via Herberton and later Almaden) to Georgetown on the Etheridge goldfield, and on through Croydon to Normanton and the Gulf of Carpentaria. Despite the later construction of railways to cover sections of the route (such as the Croydon to Normanton railway in 1891), Quartz Hill remained a coach station until 1908.

In the 1860s Ezra Firth, in partnership with James Atkinson, took up the Mount Surprise Station on the banks of Elizabeth Creek, while the Collins Brothers took up Brooklands Station to the west, on the banks of Junction Creek. The topographical feature of Quartz Hill is located on the east bank of Elizabeth Creek, about 10 kilometres (6.2 mi) downstream (northwest) from Mount Surprise. Gem quality beryl (aquamarine) and garnet were found in the area. Early twentieth century maps of the various runs of Mount Surprise Station shows that whilst Quartz Hill lay within the boundary of the Albert Downs run of Firth's Station, the location of the Quartz Hill Change Station, west of Elizabeth Creek, was in the Fixby Run of the Collins' Station. The whole area is now part of a much larger Mount Surprise Station.

Copper was discovered in the area in the mid-1860s. Geologist Richard Daintree, in partnership with William Hann, established an open-cut copper mine on what was then thought to be the Lynd River but which later proved to be a separate watercourse and was named the Einasleigh River. Ore was excavated and carted in bullock drays to Townsville, but despite good returns, the costly freight made the mine unprofitable. The partners ceased work and the mine entrance was sealed. For some years after the death of Daintree in 1878 the location was lost. Renewed mining interest in the Einasleigh River district was stimulated by the 1890s boom in copper and railways, resulting in 12 copper leases being developed in the area by 1899.

To the west of Mount Surprise Station, Georgetown was established following the discovery of gold near the Etheridge River in 1870. Initially it was just one of several shanty towns which mushroomed on the huge Etheridge goldfield. By late 1871, the (unproclaimed) township had a population of 600, and emerged as the field's administrative centre. The population and fortunes of Georgetown fluctuated in the 1870s, following the discovery in 1873 of the rich Palmer River Goldfield, and the Hodgkinson rush of 1876. However, by mid 1878 miners were returning to the Etheridge. The overland telegraph from Cardwell to Normanton reached Junction Creek, south of Mount Surprise Station, in 1871, and Ezra Firth supplied meat to the small settlement that developed there. In the 1881 Queensland Census, the Etheridge District had a population of 1042 and the towns of Charleston (later Forsayth), Georgetown, and Gilberton.

An 1886 census map of the Etheridge District shows a road from Georgetown passing through Brooklands Station, and crossing Elizabeth Creek near Quartz Hill. One branch of the road then heads south through Mount Surprise to Junction Creek, while the other branch heads north, to the Lynd River, alongside the telegraph line from Junction Creek to Palmerville.

In the late 1880s, due to the development of the Croydon goldfield and a government desire for coast-to coast mail delivery, Cobb and Co extended its Normanton to Georgetown two-day coach run and cut a rough track from Georgetown to Herberton; a distance of around 160 miles (260 km). There was already a service from Port Douglas to Herberton, but the Georgetown to Herberton "gap" was not bridged until 1888. This route was the busiest in Queensland during the Etheridge and Croydon booms, according to William Lees, writing in 1920.

The change station at Elizabeth Creek near Quartz Hill appears to have been established in 1888 to service the new Cobb & Co. route between Georgetown and Herberton. Change stations were always built near water, and a groom would feed and water the tired horses and harness a fresh team while the driver and passengers ate. Stations were generally placed about 20–30 kilometres (12–19 mi) apart. According to Cobb and Co records, the route from Herberton to Georgetown ran through Watsonville, Orient Camp, Montalbion, California Creek, Emmerson's Cobb and Co stables, Fossilbrook, and Quartz Hill, a distance of 167 miles (269 km).

A postal receiving office was opened at Quartz Hill on 13 December 1888, the first keeper being Mrs Hutson (likely the wife of Alfred Hutson, Quartz Hill Hotel). Alf Hutson was granted a Victualler's License in mid 1889 (Georgetown district), and he is listed at Quartz Hill in the February 1890 Queensland Government Gazette.

Sometime between 1890 and 1895 Arthur C Bicknell travelled from Herberton to Georgetown on a coach that was carrying mailbags. On the third night he recorded that "we arrived at a little place called Quartz Hill, where there was a fairly good hut kept by an Englishman and his wife". The coach continued with the mail to Georgetown the next day.

Between 1892 and 1903 Cobb and Co held the contract for Mail Service No. 210, running between Herberton and Georgetown. In 1898 a coach left Georgetown for Herberton every Wednesday, and left Herberton for Georgetown on Fridays. Quartz Hill was noted as a "parcel office", (i.e. a postal receiving office). By 1900 coaches left Herberton for Georgetown on Sundays and Thursdays, and left Georgetown for Herberton on Fridays and Tuesdays.

The license for the Quartz Hill Hotel was transferred to Patrick Brophy in 1900, and then to Robert Neary that same year. J Geraghty was keeper of the receiving office in 1901, the year in which at least one traveller complained about the poor food and basic bedding arrangements, and in February 1902 Margaret Geraghty was listed as the licensee at Quartz Hill.

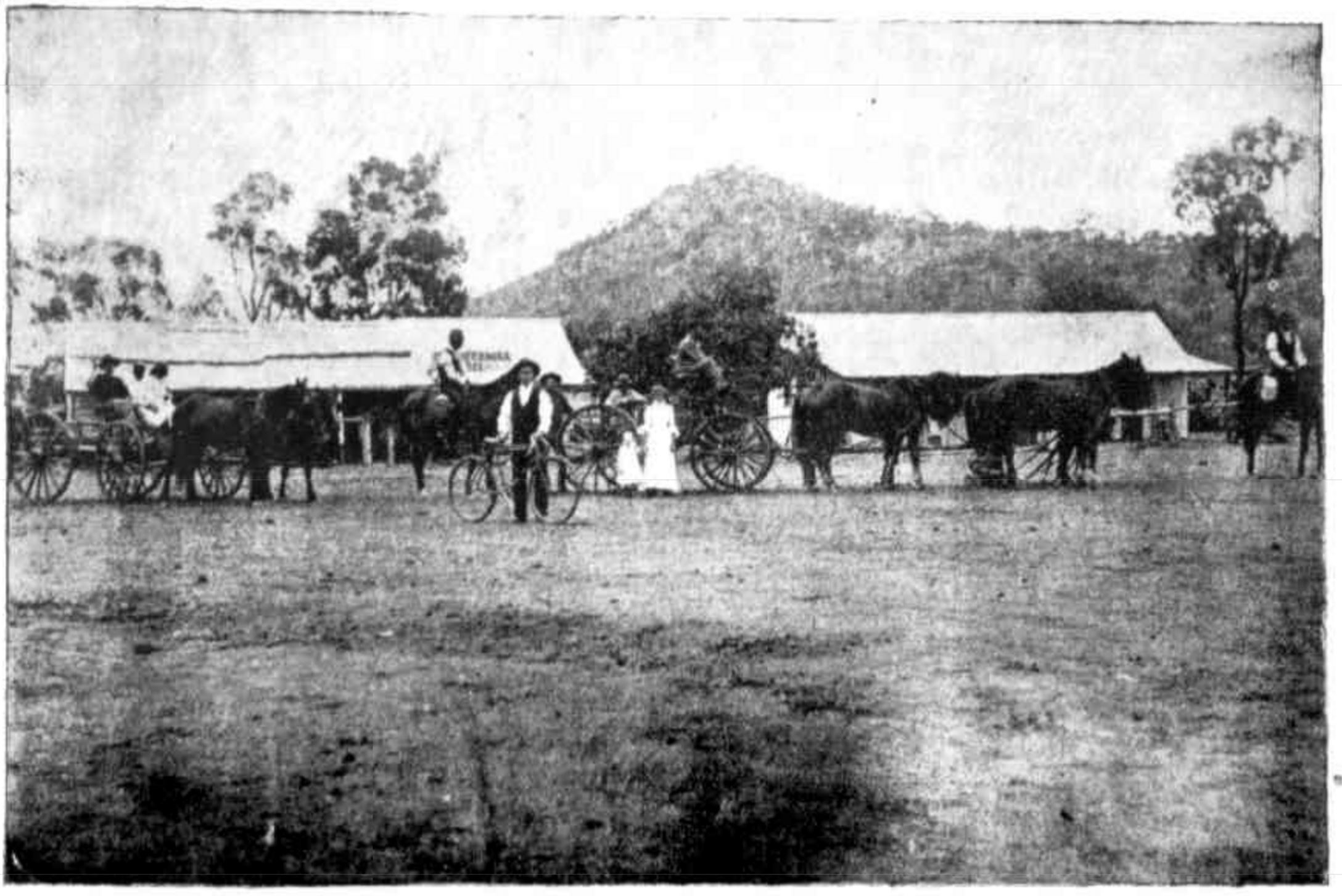
Quartz Hill "where the Georgetown and Almaden coaches meet weekly", North Queensland Register, 7 August 1905

The construction of the Chillagoe railway line meant that in 1904 Cobb and Co obtained the contract for Mail Service No. 210(a), from Almaden on the railway to Georgetown twice a week, via Sandy Tate, Rocky Tate, Petty's Change, Fossilbrook, Black Springs, Quartz Hill, and White Springs, a distance of 150 miles (240 km). John Dutton was the receiving office keeper in 1905, while in January 1906 Bridget Dutton held the license at Quartz Hill. A photograph in The North Queensland Register in 1905 shows two buildings, two local horse-buggy teams, and one bicycle, at Quartz Hill, "Where the Georgetown and Almaden Coaches meet weekly".

However, changes in transportation were threatening the existence of the Change Station at Quartz Hill. In 1900 John Moffat of the Chillagoe Railway and Mining Company acquired an interest in the Einasleigh Copper Mine, which was to prove the premier base metal producer on the Etheridge. By 1901 the copper matte was being transported by camel to Almaden via Quartz Hill. Gold from the Etheridge gold field was also transported in this manner through Quartz Hill. This mode of transportation proved unsatisfactory and by 1902 the construction of a railway line was suggested between Georgetown and Almaden to join with the Chillagoe Railway. The potential route passed through Quartz Creek, but instead the Etheridge railway line was constructed further south, through Mount Surprise and Einasleigh, terminating at Forsayth (previously Charleston). The railhead reached Mount Surprise from Almaden in 1908, and opened at Forsayth in January 1910.

In January 1907 Cobb and Co sold its interest in the Almaden to Georgetown run to JS Love, and John Dutton died the following month, aged 49. His headstone still stands in the small cemetery near the site of the Change Station. A map in the 1908 Annual Report of the Department of Mines still shows a hotel at Quartz Hill, and Bridget Dutton was the licensee for the year ending June 1908. However, by March 1909 Quartz Hill was no longer mentioned under Licensed Victuallers in the Georgetown district, and Bridget Dutton had taken on the license at the Australian Hotel in Einasleigh. The receiving office at Quartz Hill seems to have closed in July 1908, the same month that a post office opened in Mount Surprise, no doubt due to the railway having reached the latter location.

== Description ==
The site is on the western bank of Elizabeth Creek, approximately 10 kilometres (6.2 mi) downstream from Mount Surprise. On the opposite bank of the creek stands the natural feature called Quartz Hill. Apart from the trees alongside the creek bed, the site is sparsely vegetated, and the bare soil is scattered with basalt stones.

The significant remnants of the Quartz Hill Change Station include the cemetery, the rectangular stone foundations of the hotel, a large bottle dump, several stone formations of unknown purpose, two small cleared areas, and an old road to the crossing of Elizabeth Creek, which is marked by a blazed tree. There is also a scattering of metal artefacts, including horseshoes. All of these components can be found between the existing roads and Elizabeth Creek.

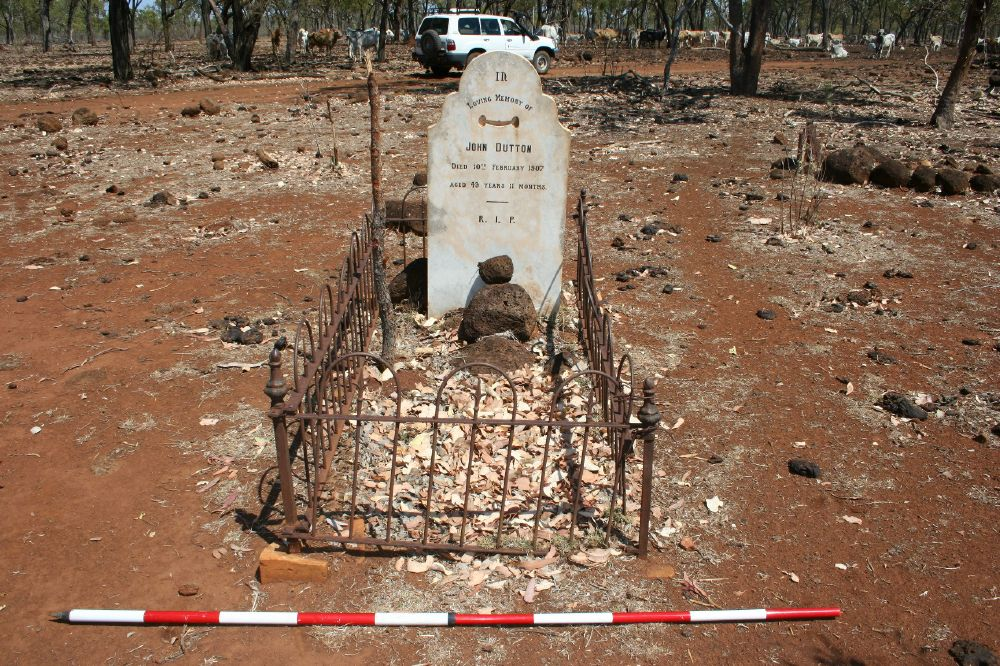
John Dutton's grave

When the main road from Mount Surprise turns west towards the O'Briens Creek Gemfields, a secondary track continues northwest, and passes close to the four graves in the cemetery. The southernmost grave is that of John Dutton. It faces east and has a marble headstone. A cast-iron fence, set into stone corner plinths, surrounds the grave. The other three graves face southwest; the grave just north of John Dutton's grave consists of a cast-iron headstone with no inscription and a rectangular arrangement of stones. The next grave has a rectangular cairn of basalt stones, stacked on top of a plinth of quartz rocks. The northernmost grave has the least intact stone arrangement.

About 190 metres (620 ft) southeast of the cemetery are the foundations of what was probably the hotel. The foundation stones enclose an area about 5 metres (16 ft) wide by 13 metres (43 ft) long, and seem to have an internal partition towards the southern end and a 2 metres (6 ft 7 in) extension to the east. A line of stones also extends north from the northwestern corner. South of the foundations is a cleared rectangular earth pad.

To the northeast of the hotel foundations is a three-sided linear formation of stones, and to the north of this is a cleared area of about 30 by 20 metres (98 by 66 ft). Southeast of the hotel is a group of flat stones around a small tree, and further southeast is an overgrown, horseshoe shaped arrangement of stones that could be a hearth or a shelter. East of the hotel, near the creek, is a large artefact scatter, mostly of green beer bottles with some tin, spread over an area of about 5 by 15 metres (16 by 49 ft). North of this bottle dump is an extensive scatter of tin, glass, ceramics and metal. Some distance to the south is a small depression containing a bottle and metal scatter.

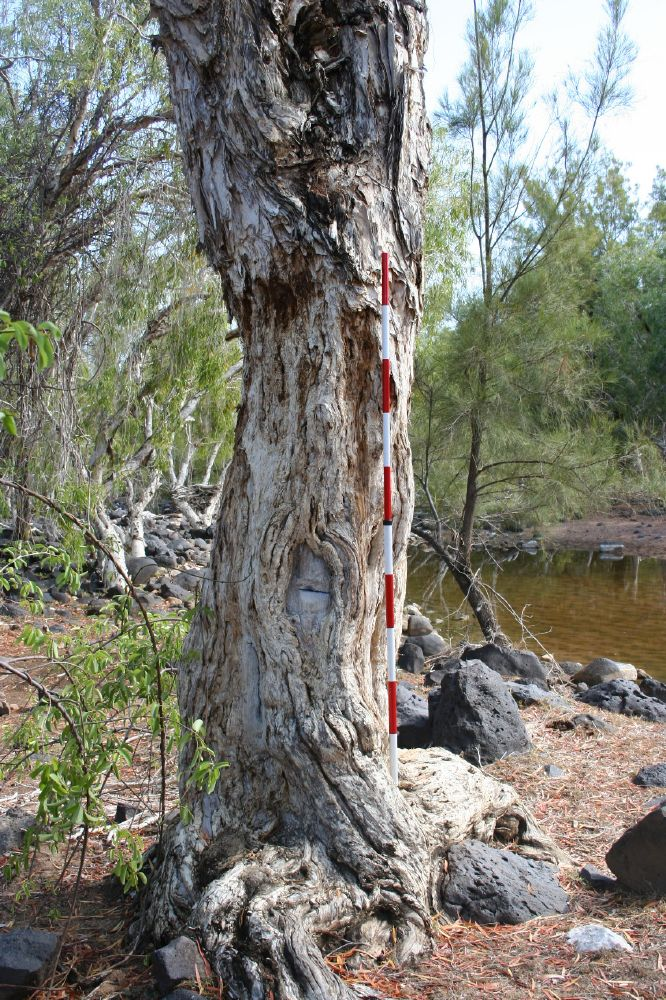
Blazed tree

At some distance to the southeast of the hotel is a section of the coach road. The road originally headed south after crossing the creek, before swinging to the northwest to head past the hotel. The modern road now obscures the section towards the hotel, and a modern cattle track exists just to the west of the coach road's approach to the creek. On the western bank of the crossing stands a blazed melaleuca tree. Further southeast is a horseshoe shaped stone structure, 2 by 1.5 metres (6 ft 7 in by 4 ft 11 in), which stands at one end of an L-shaped stone arrangement. This structure and the graves are the most obvious features of the change station site, and can easily be seen from the road.

== Heritage listing ==
Quartz Hill Coach Change Station Site and Cemetery was listed on the Queensland Heritage Register on 4 July 2006 having satisfied the following criteria.

The place is important in demonstrating the evolution or pattern of Queensland's history.

The development of a Coach Change Station at Quartz Hill demonstrates how the development of North Queensland's mining and pastoral industries required the establishment of transport routes to service those industries. The exploitation of the Etheridge Goldfield led to the 1888 development of a Cobb and Co coach route from Herberton, and later Almaden, to Georgetown, with an overnight stop at Quartz Hill. The building foundation remnants at Quartz Hill, along with a bottle dump, evidence of the coach road, and a small cemetery, mark the location of an important early transport route in Northern Queensland, and demonstrate the functional arrangement of a class of places that, due to changes in technology, is no longer in use.

The place has potential to yield information that will contribute to an understanding of Queensland's history.

The remains of the Coach Change Station have the potential to provide new information about construction methods in rural North Queensland during the late nineteenth century. Analysis of the Change Station's surviving infrastructure, including the building foundation remnants, bottle dump, evidence of the coach road, and a small cemetery, and the spatial arrangement of its components (including the proximity of this remnant evidence to water), would also aid understanding in how late 19th century and early 20th century coach change stations functioned, and how people lived and worked in these places.
