= Mount Surprise, Queensland =

Mount Surprise
- Town
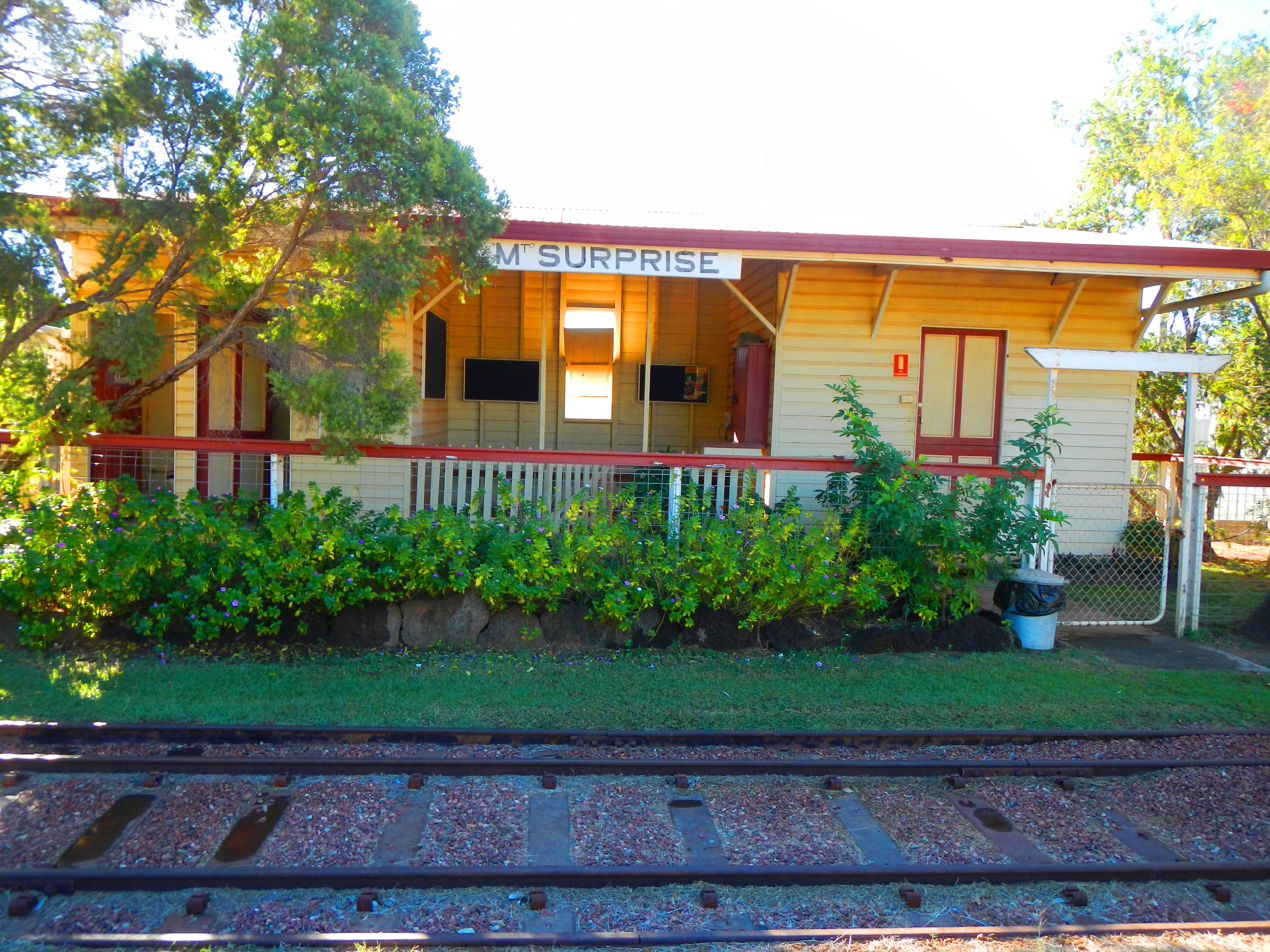
- Mount Surprise railway station

- Interactive map of Mount Surprise
- Coordinates: 18.1455°S 144.3175°E
- Country: Australia
- State: Queensland
- LGA: Shire of Etheridge
- Location: 99.9 km (62.1 mi) W of Georgetown; 124 km (77 mi) SW of Mount Garnet; 219 km (136 mi) SW of Atherton; 285 km (177 mi) SW of Cairns; 1,717 km (1,067 mi) NNW of Brisbane

Government
  - State electorate: Traeger
  - Federal division: Kennedy

Area
  - Total: 3,613.4 km^{2} (1,395.1 sq mi)
- Elevation: 453 m (1,486 ft)

Population
  - Total: 138 (2021 census)
  - Density: 0.03819/km^{2} (0.0989/sq mi)
- Time zone: UTC+10:00 (AEST)
- Postcode: 4871
- Mean max temp: 31.1 °C (88.0 °F)
- Mean min temp: 16.1 °C (61.0 °F)
- Annual rainfall: 790.3 mm (31.11 in)
Localities around Mount Surprise
Abingdon Downs	Fossilbrook; Springfield	Forty Mile
Talaroo	Mount Surprise	Minnamoolka
Einasleigh	Conjuboy	Greenvale

Mount Surprise is a rural town and locality in the Shire of Etheridge, Queensland, Australia. In the 2021 census, the locality of Mount Surprise had a population of 138 people.

== Geography ==
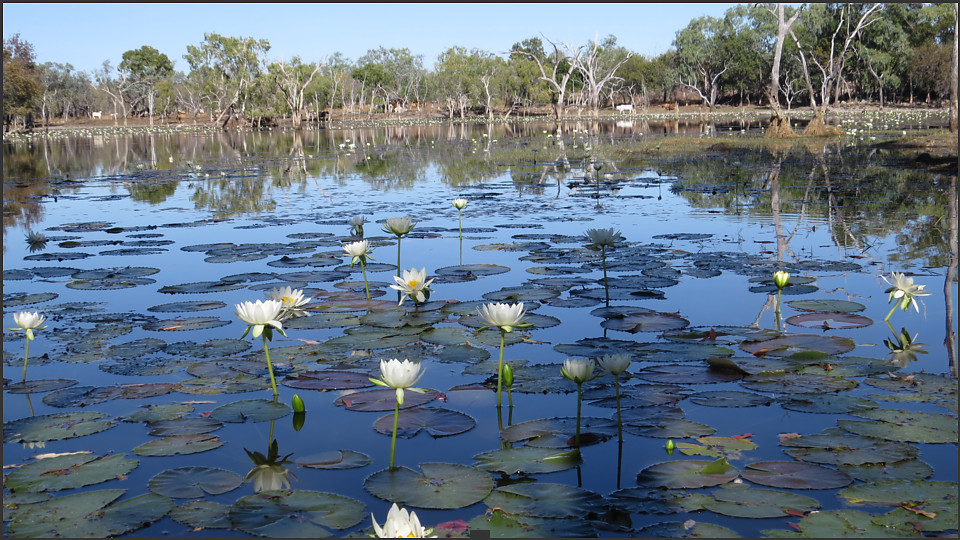
Waterlily dam, 2022

The town is located in the Gulf Savannah in Far North Queensland on the Gulf Developmental Road, 1,722 kilometres (1,070 mi) north west of the state capital, Brisbane and 285 kilometres (177 mi) west of the regional centre of Cairns.

== History ==
The town was founded by Ezra Firth, from the English county of Yorkshire, who along with his family settled in the area in 1864. The property struggled at first; relations with the indigenous inhabitants of the country were hostile and the country was not suited for wool growing. The discovery of gold in the 1880s and the subsequent gold rush allowed Firth to sell his sheep to the miners, convert his holding to cattle and become wealthy selling goods to the miners. In 1908, the Etheridge railway line reached Mount Surprise.

Mount Surprise Post Office opened by July 1908.

Mount Surprise State School opened on 12 February 1917.

In October 1942, detachments of 16 Australian Field Company, Royal Australian Engineers travelled to Cooktown, Mount Surprise and Coen to build Repeater Huts.

== Demographics ==
In the 2006 census, the locality of Mount Surprise and the surrounding area had a population of 162 people.

In the 2011 census, the locality of Mount Surprise had a population of 306 people.

In the 2016 census, the locality of Mount Surprise had a population of 169 people.

In the 2021 census, the locality of Mount Surprise had a population of 138 people.

== Heritage listings ==
Mount Surprise has a number of heritage-listed sites, including:

- Gulf Developmental Road: Radar Hill
- Via Mount Surprise: Quartz Hill Coach Change Station
- Etheridge railway line: Mount Surprise railway station

== Education ==
Mount Surprise State School is a government primary (Early Childhood to Year 6) school for boys and girls at Garland Street (18.1465°S 144.3199°E). In 2018, the school had an enrolment of 23 students with 3 teachers and 5 non-teaching staff (2 full-time equivalent).

There are no secondary schools in Mount Surprise, nor nearby. Distance education and boarding school are the alternatives.

== Amenities ==
The town has a pub, one cafe, two petrol stations with a small store, a post office, a train station, a gem-shop, a police station and two trailer parks or caravan parks. One park, Bedrock Village Caravan Park & Tours, has camp sites, cabins and a pool. It is one of the tour operators for guided tours to the lava tubes at Undara Volcanic National Park. At the Mount Surprise Tourist Park, a large bird aviary is open to the public.

== Attractions ==
Some of the Savannahlander tourist rail services start from, passes through, or stop at Mount Surprise.

Collins Lookout is in the north of the locality (18.0389°S 144.4886°E). It is within the Byrimine cattle station.

The town is near the Undara Volcanic National Park and Forty Mile Scrub National Park. Other activities in the area include gem fossicking.

== Gallery ==
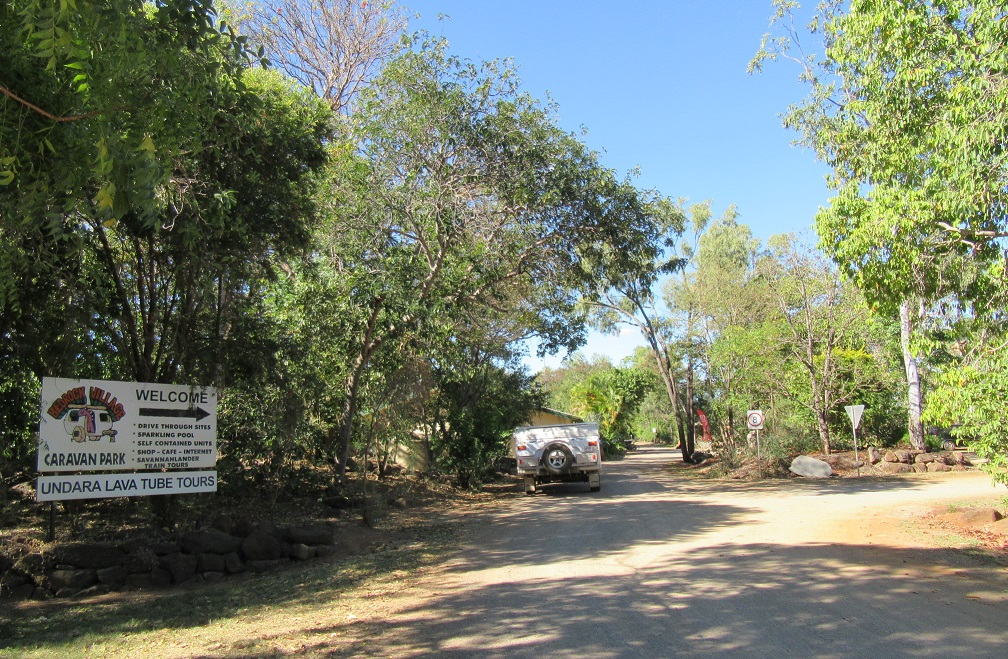
Bedrock Village Caravan Park

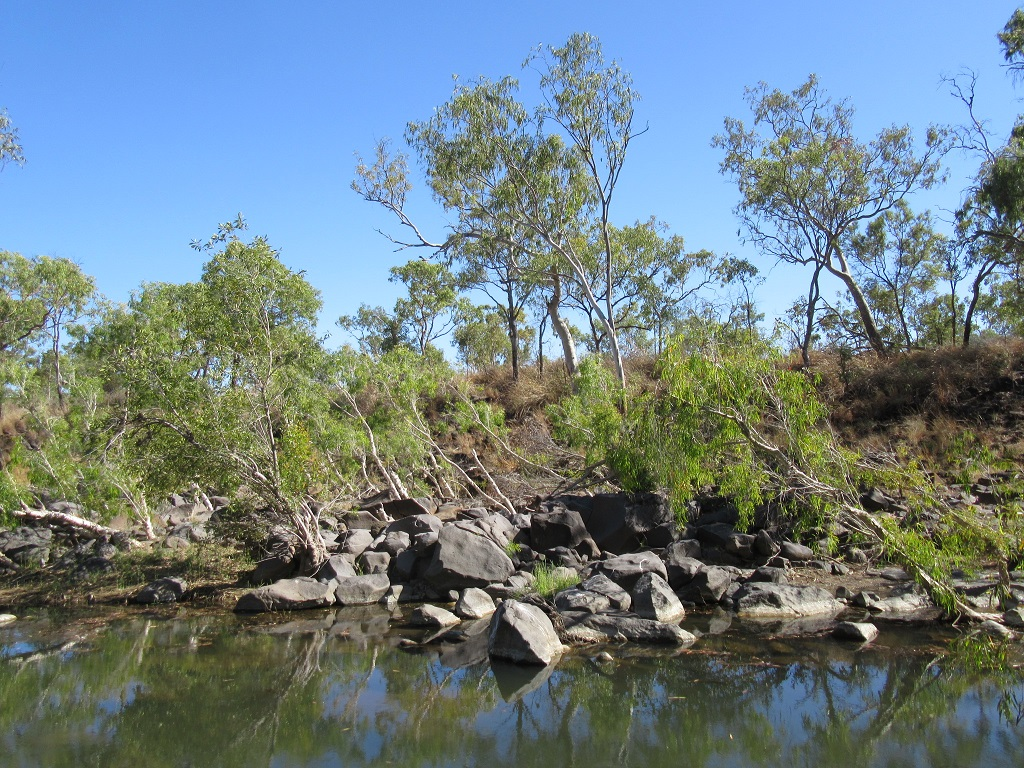
Elizabeth Creek behind Bedrock Village

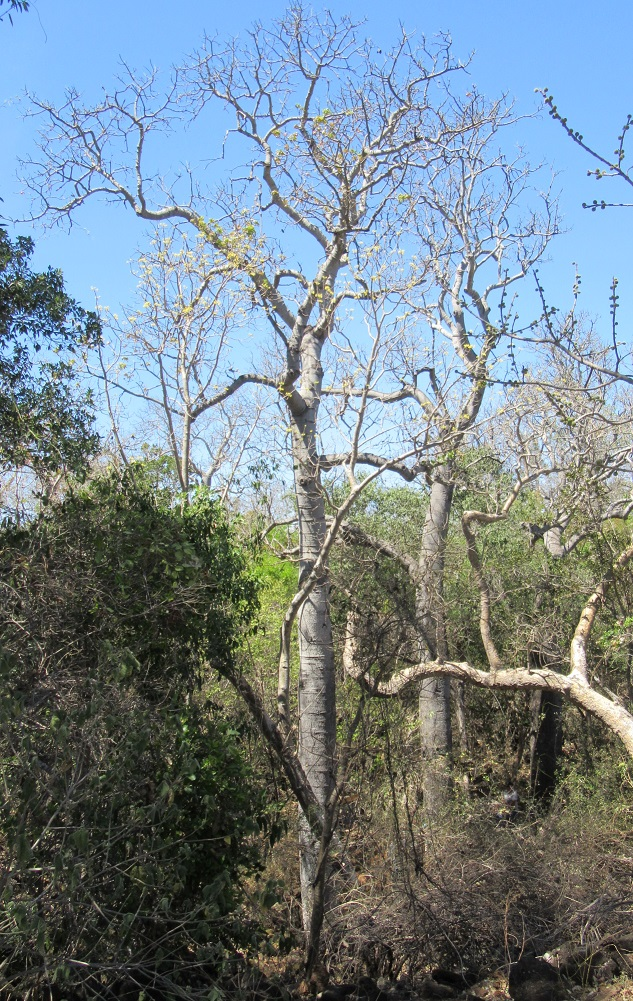
A Brachychiton australis (Broad-leaved bottle tree) in Undara Volcanic National Park
