= Port of Ortona =

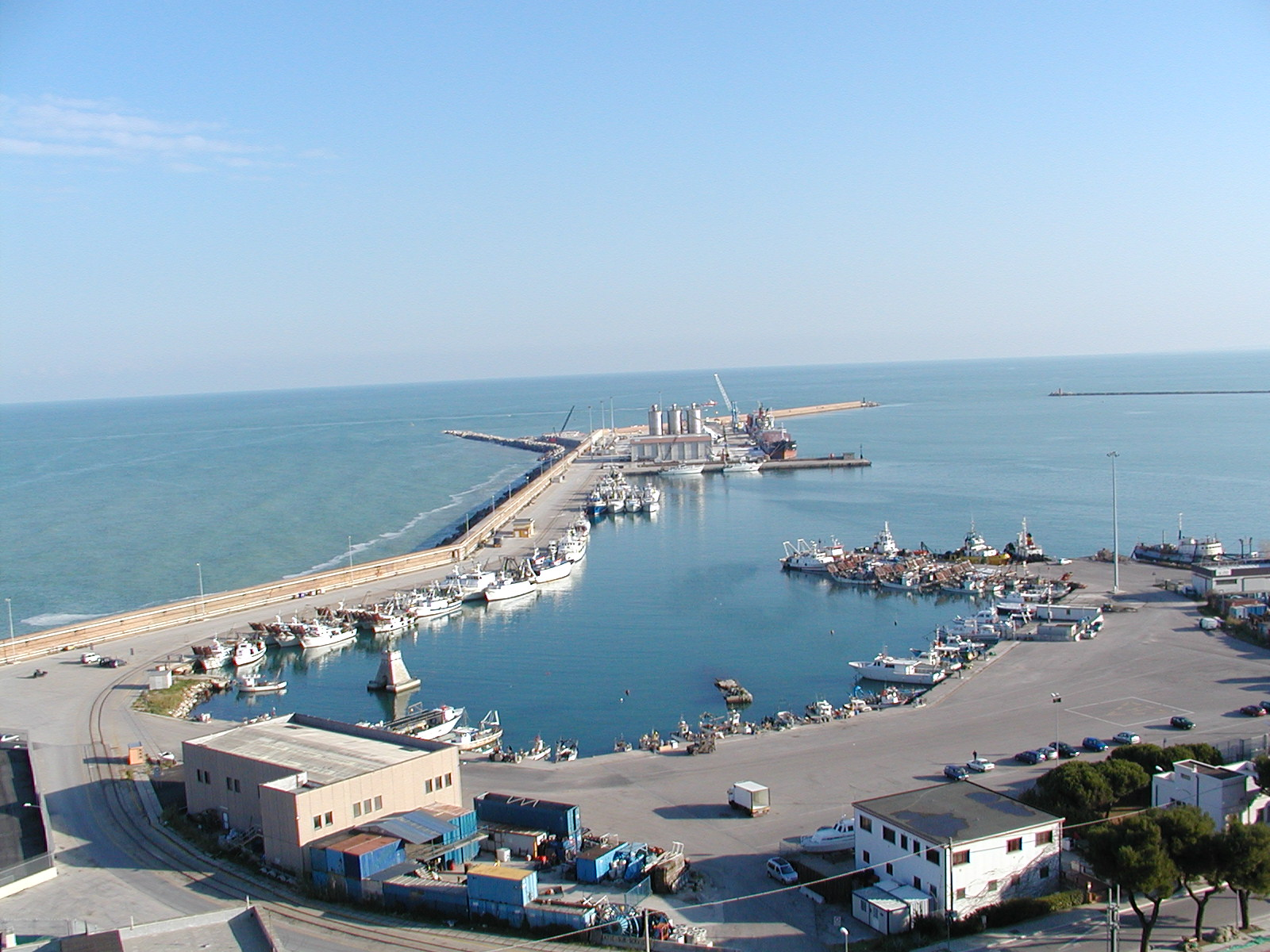
- Harbour

Location
- Country: Italy
- Location: Ortona
- Coordinates: 42°21′06″N 14°24′52″E
- UN/LOCODE: IT OTN

Details
- Type of harbour: Natural/Artificial

Port of Ortona (Italian: Porto di Ortona) is a port serving Ortona, Abruzzo, Italy. It is the largest port in Abruzzo.

The port offers a wide range of services, including: cargo handling, national bonded warehouses, national and international shipping, fire services, electricity, slipway, crane, travel lift, engine repairs, slipway, and electrical repairs. It also has areas reserved for recreational boats, whose vessels can moor at seasonal piers. The management offices are made up of the Port Authority, a Maritime District Office and a Customs Office.
