= Radar Hill, Mount Surprise =

Heritage-listed radar station in Queensland, Australia

Radar Hill
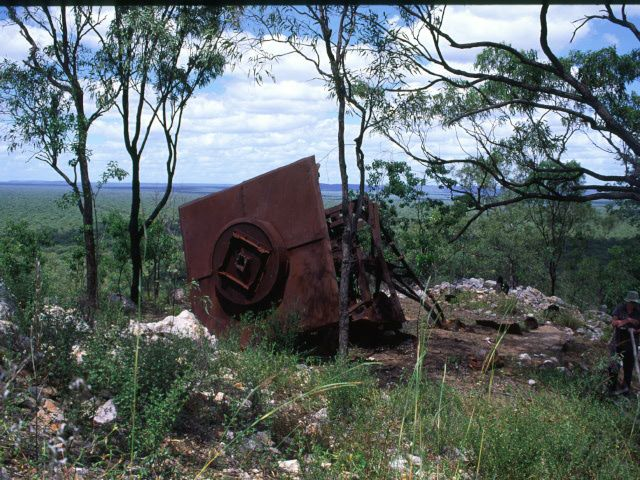
- Remains of the radar station, 2004

- Location within Queensland Location within Australia
- 18.1204°S 144.3479°E
- Location: Gulf Developmental Road, Mount Surprise, Shire of Etheridge, Queensland, Australia

History
- Design period: 1939–1945 (World War II)
- Built: About August 1943

Queensland Heritage Register
- Official name: No.53 RDF Station, Radar Hill
- Type: state heritage (built, archaeological)
- Designated: 12 July 2005
- Reference no.: 602259
- Significant period: 1943 (fabric); 1943–1945 (historical)
- Significant components: sentry post/s, pole/s – telephone, tower – radar, camouflage net securing points, barbed wire, bunker – concrete, slab/s – concrete, pit – weapons, cable – power, terracing, machinery/plant/equipment – defence, machine gun mounting
- Builders: Allied Works Council

Radar Hill is a heritage-listed radar station at Gulf Developmental Road, Mount Surprise, Shire of Etheridge, Queensland, Australia. It was built about August 1943 by the Allied Works Council. It is also known as No. 53 RDF Station. It was added to the Queensland Heritage Register on 12 July 2005.

== History ==
No.53 Radio Direction Finding Station was established in 1943 at Mount Surprise as one of 25 RDF stations controlled by the Royal Australian Air Force No.42 Radar Wing Headquarters in Townsville. These stations were constructed across northern Australia to provide warning of potential Japanese aircraft raids on Queensland's eastern seaboard centres. They utilised the most secretive of new technology and for security reasons little was known by the wider community of their existence and function. Frequently much of the associated infrastructure at these sites was removed or demolished after World War II.

In response to the Japanese military dominance in Southeast Asia and the western Pacific in 1942–43 and with the invasion of Australia seemingly imminent, a network of Radio Direction Finding (RDF) stations was established throughout the northern inland and coastal regions of Australia and Papua New Guinea and islands of the western Pacific Ocean. The Royal Australian Air Force constructed 25 RDF stations in northern Queensland, covering the area from Mackay to the Torres Strait, the Atherton Tableland, Cloncurry district and the Gulf of Carpentaria.

No.53 RDF Station at Mount Surprise was a key link in the detection of low flying aircraft heading from the Japanese-occupied Dutch East Indies via the Gulf of Carpentaria in the direction of Townsville or the Atherton Tableland, in the Cairns hinterland, where many Australian and American military units were undergoing jungle warfare training. Its other roles were to provide assistance to the Catalina flying boats returning to base in Townsville, following long-range patrol over Java and in the training of radar personnel prior to postings to "active" areas.

Radio Direction Finding technology – later termed Radar to follow the American terminology – was developed by the British during the lead up to the second world war and was quickly shared with its major allies, including Australia. The enemy did not possess the technology; hence its development and application gave the allies an edge at a crucial time during the war. The equipment installed at the Australian radar stations was mostly an Australian version of the original British technology. The British Aircraft to Surface Vessel Mk I was modified by Australia's Radiophysics Laboratory (RPL) to a Shore Defence or Coastal Artillery radar then rapidly modified again by RPL to become Air Warning Mk I. These Australian electronics were the first in the world to have a timebase which was virtually unaffected by voltage variations in the power supply. The Australian version was designed for the tropics and was lightweight and portable for installation in remote locations.

The installation at Mount Surprise was Australian designed: an Air Warning (AW) aerial on an AW tower weighing 12 long tons (12 t), with AW electronics. It is likely that the station operated AW Mk2 equipment, designed to be assembled on site from a kit provided. The kit, known as a "Doover", comprised the control tower, a hut for radar operators and mechanic, turning mechanism and radar transmitter/receiver screen and was hauled to the summit of the hill by flying fox. This rig proved extremely reliable and efficient in the tropics and was used by Australian, American and British forces. The operators' hut was lined with masonite and clad with galvanized iron and was supplemented by separate facilities for power generation and distribution, operations and signals. The radar screen in this equipment utilised a 5 inches (130 mm) cathode-ray tube built into the receiver cabinet. The generator likely was powered by a Ford V8 alternator and the aerial was easily put together as it was formed from piping and hand turned.

The Allied Works Council (AWC) constructed No.53 RDF Station at Mount Surprise in early to mid 1943. A camp was constructed at the southern base of the hill and consisted of mess, kitchen and toilet/washroom facilities and accommodation tents. Replacement of the tents with prefabricated masonite huts commenced in November 1943, with all but one replaced by the end of March 1944. One airman later recorded that it was a very comfortable camp. Water was pumped some considerable distance from Elizabeth Creek.

No.53 RDF was formed at Richmond, New South Wales on 15 May 1943 with establishment strength of 38 (including one officer). Thirty-six personnel departed Richmond on 19 July 1943 with an advance party arriving at Mount Surprise on 29 July. The officer in charge conducted an inspection of facilities and returned immediately to No.42 Radar Wing in Townsville with a report.

The remaining personnel arrived on 14 August 1943 when investigations were under way to locate a suitable airstrip. By the end of that month, a camouflage party from the Department of Home Security was engaged at the station. During this time black-out lighting was installed, preparation of slit trenches was under-way, fixed weapons had been installed and small arms were issued to the airmen whose defence training included shooting expeditions in the surrounding country. Defence preparations continued in January 1944 with the construction of a 25-yard shooting range.

The radar installation was completed on 15 August 1943. Initially, No. 53 RDF obtained very few radar plots and there was uncertainty as to whether this was due to technical limitations (i.e. lack of range of the equipment) or due to absence of aircraft within reasonable range. Within three months the equipment was determined to provide excellent results at long range. In February 1944, despite technical difficulties and the Station operational on reduced power, results at up to 100 miles (160 km) range were achieved.

The rapid early development in radar technology was evident at this station with the installation of an interrogator (equipment designed to receive and interpret signals to detect if an aircraft was 'friend or foe'). The Station Diary (A50s) records that the interrogator installation party arrived by aircraft on 14 December 1943 and had the equipment operational within two days.

Station morale was maintained by the periodic visits of various padres on chaplaincy duty and officers of the 25 OBU (Operational Base Unit) who showed educational films and discussed technical courses. Fraternising with locals was not prohibited and generally took place at the nearby Mount Surprise hotel which was restricted to wartime rations of one nine gallon keg per week; at the weekly dances; and at cricket matches (e.g. "singles" vs "marrieds"). Other recreational pursuits took the form of a comprehensive physical training program including gymnastics and swimming parades. Overnight fishing expeditions to deep water holes along Elizabeth Creek were organized through the local police station and there were shooting expeditions to the surrounding country.

Rations were supplemented by the raising of young pigs captured during hunting expeditions to the surrounding country. Captured piglets were kept in a pen near the encampment and fed on kitchen scraps until considered rid of their objectionable wild taste.

Diary entries record the occasional disruptions to radar watch caused by normal and special maintenance or technical difficulties and the periodic visits of RAAF technicians to undertake special maintenance. Other interruptions arose from the occasional storm and disruptions to the power supply and interference to the otherwise poor telephone communications leaving the station totally isolated.

As the threat of invasion by Japan declined, significant operational changes occurred at No.53 RDF. From 22 May 1944 the previously continuous radar watch was reduced to four hours daily and by the end of June, operational strength was reduced to 18. Hitherto, operational strength had varied between 29 and 41.

On 8 January 1945 the Station was placed on a "care and maintenance basis" with reduced personnel after which its operational strength rapidly declined as staff were deployed elsewhere. The Station was relocated to Pitt Town, New South Wales on 2 June 1945.

Throughout its entire operational period, No.53 RDF Mount Surprise never detected any enemy aircraft and was never confronted with any hostility.

The former encampment area at the southern base of Mount Lookout is now the site of a local shire council gravel extraction operation.

== Description ==
The remnant fabric of No.53 RDF Station at Mt. Surprise is dispersed over a wide area. The now collapsed radar control tower (part of the 'Doover') is located in the original position just beneath a rocky knoll at the northern end of Mount Lookout. From its location, excellent views are obtained west, north and east over the surrounding flat country. Extending southwards, other remnant infrastructure is located at various points on three small terraces at descending elevations and at the base of the hill where the encampment was located.

At the summit on the northern side there is a concrete roofed bunker (now semi-collapsed), excavated into the rocky outcrop, in association with a pit with circular concrete base and an embedded metal cylinder stood vertical. The metal cylinder has a handle and locking pin. This device is thought to be associated with a fixed machine gun. The pit is semi-ringed with excavated earth/rock.

Directly below the rocky knoll of the summit is a small flat terrace (8.2 by 8.8 metres (27 ft × 29 ft)) of granitic gravel/sand retained on one side by a low rock wall and an underlying concrete base for the Doover hut and tower. The Doover hut and tower, now collapsed and minus the transmitter/receiver (radar screen) and aerial etc., is essentially a four-legged BHP steel frame structure with remnant elements of corrugated iron sheeting (for the hut which housed 2 radar operators and a mechanic). Small ventilation slits are evident in one corrugated iron sheet. Other surviving features include electrical wire and metal conduit pipe. Turning mechanisms lie close by on the pad while further turning gear is evident within the structure. It appears that some of the iron in the structure has been salvaged at some time in the past.

The entire summit including the Doover pad is encircled by remnants of a 9–10 strand wire/barbed wire fence strung on bush poles (local adaptation) and semi-flanked on the western, northern and eastern sides by small "sentry posts" constructed from local rocks. A short swing arm is bolted near the top of some of the bush poles. The strategically placed "sentry posts" offer good vantage points to the country below. They are typically a crescent shaped arrangement of rocks piled to create a low protective barrier. Three iron stay poles are affixed to the ground at separate points some distance from the Doover. The cement base in which one stay is embedded is inscribed with the initials FWG, RCR, ECL and the date 6.5.43.

Other local adaptations are evident. Ironwood and Ironbark trees, used as telephone poles, with ceramic insulators affixed to squared timber cross-arms bolted to the trees, still survive. An Ironwood tree (as telephone pole) adjacent to the Doover is a particularly fine example, with fine bush carpentry still evident. Also in evidence is the negligible regrowth (callousing) over the cut since its creation.

To the south, on a small terrace below the Doover, is an area of introduced granitic gravel/sand (7.4 by 11.4 metres (24 ft × 37 ft)) similar to that used for enlargement of the Doover pad. No building foundations are evident in this deposit however a linear stone arrangement and a small pit and mound feature can be seen. Excavation in this area may shed light on the former function.

Further south, close to the southern edge of the third terrace, is another collapsed bunker with concrete roof and associated pit with circular concrete base and an embedded metal cylinder stood vertical. The metal cylinder has a handle and locking pin. The pit is semi-ringed with excavated earth/rock. This structure closely resembles the other at the summit. Two rock-piled "sentry posts" are found at slightly lower elevations near this second bunker/pit complex. They have roughly southern aspects.

A total of eight (8) rock-piled "sentry posts" were noted at various points around the summit and third terrace.

Two concrete slabs of equal dimensions (4.0 by 5.6 metres (13.1 ft × 18.4 ft)) lie further south and downslope on the lowest (fourth) terrace. One slab is located on the upslope margin of the terrace and close by, to the west, an Ironwood "telephone pole" tree with squared timber cross section and insulators. To the east of this cement pad a single strand of fence wire is strung from the ground and affixed high onto an adjacent Ironwood tree with wire netting attached to the lower part close to the ground (possibly a base for hessian camouflage netting). A number of possible walking pads zig-zag indeterminately upslope from this cement pad. The cement pad presents evidence of division into a roomed structure (with bolts protruding from the cement).

On the same terrace in a westerly direction is an identical concrete pad (4.0 by 5.6 metres (13.1 ft × 18.4 ft)) with protruding bolts and an adjacent Ironwood "telephone pole" tree with squared timber cross-arms affixed with bolts. Nearby lies a fallen, partially burnt bush telephone pole and associated ceramic insulators and fixings (some now dislodged and lying separate).

A faint, wide track leads from the eastern cement pad in the direction of the other.

At the southern base of the hill is a T-shaped concrete pad with associated deep pit and collapsed cement slab with oval/circular holes. Another cement pad is located some distance away in a southwest direction. These features are thought to be associated with the encampment. Ongoing excavation into the southern base of Mount Lookout for gravel extraction may have significantly destroyed the encampment area. On 11 March 2004, a long and narrow heap of piled earth was noted (11/3/2004) to contain cement and other metal debris.

== Heritage listing ==
No.53 RDF Station was listed on the Queensland Heritage Register on 12 July 2005 having satisfied the following criteria.

The place is important in demonstrating the evolution or pattern of Queensland's history.

No.53 RDF Station at Mount Surprise is important in demonstrating the pattern of Queensland's history, being surviving evidence associated with the early development and use of radar technology to provide an air warning system to assist in the defence of Australia during World War Two. As one of a small network of 25 coastal and inland radio defence finding stations established in northern Queensland in 1942–44 it is significant for the role it played in providing an early warning mechanism for Townsville and for the many Australian and American units at training camps dispersed throughout the Atherton Tableland.

The place demonstrates rare, uncommon or endangered aspects of Queensland's cultural heritage.

No.53 RDF Station demonstrates a rare aspect of Queensland's cultural heritage. It was one of a small network of RDF stations established in northern Queensland during the World War Two. Much of the associated infrastructure with these sites was removed or demolished after the war and there has been attrition at these sites since 1945. Each site is important in displaying adaptation to the particular location characteristics and topography.

The place has potential to yield information that will contribute to an understanding of Queensland's history.

The associated archaeological remains at No.53 RDF Station have the potential to provide valuable information contributing to an understanding of Queensland's history. Analysis of the surviving infrastructure could assist in understanding how radar stations were spatially arranged and constructed in response to the particular features of the chosen site; the physical problems encountered by the Allied Works Council (AWC) and Royal Australian Air Force (RAAF) personnel while working and living in an isolated part of inland Queensland; and the specific adaptations to the challenging local environment. Scattered artifacts and archaeological remains (rusted metal, concrete slabs, bunkers, pits and sentry posts etc.) could reveal information about the technology applied in the construction and operation of World War Two radar establishments, including temporary military buildings and structures and the associated communications infrastructure.
