= Joseph Morris Mine =

- Location within Queensland Location within Australia
- 19.2565°S 143.6697°E
- Location: Georgetown Mining District, Gilberton, Shire of Etheridge, Queensland, Australia

History
- Design period: 1900 - 1914 (early 20th century)
- Built: 1903 - 1910

Queensland Heritage Register
- Official name: Joseph Morris Mine
- Type: state heritage (archaeological)
- Designated: 5 April 2004
- Reference no.: 601855
- Significant period: 1903-1910 (fabric, historical)
- Significant components: machinery/plant/equipment - mining/mineral processing, mine - open cut, mullock heap, furnace, mounting block/stand, kiln

Joseph Morris Mine is a heritage-listed former mine at Georgetown Mining District, Gilberton, Shire of Etheridge, Queensland, Australia. It was built from 1903 to 1910. It was added to the Queensland Heritage Register on 5 April 2004.

== History ==
The Etheridge Gold Fields were discovered in 1869, with the first findings along the Etheridge River. By 1885 the Etheridge field, was the second most important in Queensland after Charters Towers, producing upwards of 20,000 ounces (570,000 g) of gold.

Gilberton township was founded in the 1870s, in a remote area some 110 kilometres (68 mi) south of the principal township of Georgetown. The gold found around Gilberton occurred in a free state and was erratically distributed. Sometimes almost barren quartz yielded phenomenally rich patches of gold. For example, 2 long tons (2.0 t) of ore from the Joseph Morris field returned 48.23 ounces (1,367 g) after rich specimens had been removed.

Although the nearby Cosmopolitan line of reefs was worked from 1871, the Joseph Morris reef was not worked until 1903. The Joseph Morris mine was sunk to 60 metres (200 ft) on a reef striking north. The remaining workings consist of a timbered shaft, open to the water level of about 30 metres (98 ft) and situated in the middle of a line of collapsed stopes.

A 60-ounce (1,700 g) nugget is reported to have been found near the Joseph Morris mine. The reef was well noted for its sometimes extremely rich returns. The mine was worked in 1903, 1907 and 1910, producing 403.2 ounces (11,430 g) of gold from 37 long tons (38 t) of ore.

Local information claims that the mine was named after the son of an early owner, though this has not been able to be confirmed.

== Description ==
The mine workings are located immediately on top of a steep bank overlooking a creek. They comprise an open-cut shaft or collapsed stope with a drive extending along the strike of the reef which is about 8 metres (26 ft) in depth. A mullock dump descends from the shaft to the creek bed. A portable engine and a portable boiler are aligned to the mine workings. The boiler is a wet bottom type constructed with early conical pointed rivets and possibly manufactured in the United States. Remnants of a stone mount for a Cornish boiler, located alongside the portable plant, are also aligned towards the mine. A Cornish boiler, which was still on site (though not in situ) in the mid 1970s, has since been removed. South of the machinery area is a rock scatter associated with a stone and mud mortar flue and chimney base, which may have also been foundations for a second Cornish boiler. Further south is an iron lined assay furnace of stone construction, and a small top-fed retort kiln. There is no definite evidence of a battery, such as discarded stamps, cams or tailings. The only likely battery foundations are two short vertical iron bolts, 1.6 metres (5 ft 3 in) apart, aligned with the portable engine. However these were more likely tension bolts for an engine or winch. An extensive area on the opposite bank of the creek extending west to the main road has been subjected to recent tree clearance and surface bulldozing. If a battery was located on the west side of Sandy Creek then all evidence of foundations and dumps would have been lost.

Surviving plants include:

- one-cylinder portable steam engine - no brand (R. Hornsby or Ruston Hornsby?)
- Portable wet bottom boiler - no brand

== Heritage listing ==
Joseph Morris Mine was listed on the Queensland Heritage Register on 5 April 2004 having satisfied the following criteria.

The place is important in demonstrating the evolution or pattern of Queensland's history.

The Joseph Morris mine is important in demonstrating the evolution of the gold-mining industry in Queensland, particularly in the remote Gilberton field, a part of the Etheridge Gold Field. The Joseph Morris mine is significant for demonstrating a range of gold yields in quartz ore from barren to exceedingly rich.

The place demonstrates rare, uncommon or endangered aspects of Queensland's cultural heritage.

A portable steam engine and portable boiler on site are now the only such surviving examples recorded in the Gilberton locality. The wet bottom portable boiler is possibly of United States origin and is early and rare. It is the only wet bottom boiler recorded in North Queensland, and was probably used to power winding gear.

The place is important in demonstrating the principal characteristics of a particular class of cultural places.

The Joseph Morris mine is significant as it is representative example of the human effort and those technologies employed in gold mining operations during the second period of early mining on the Gilberton field at the beginning of the 20th century. The place contains a range of plant and structural features that were once representative of the second period of early mining on the remote Gilberton field.
