= Mount Moran Battery =

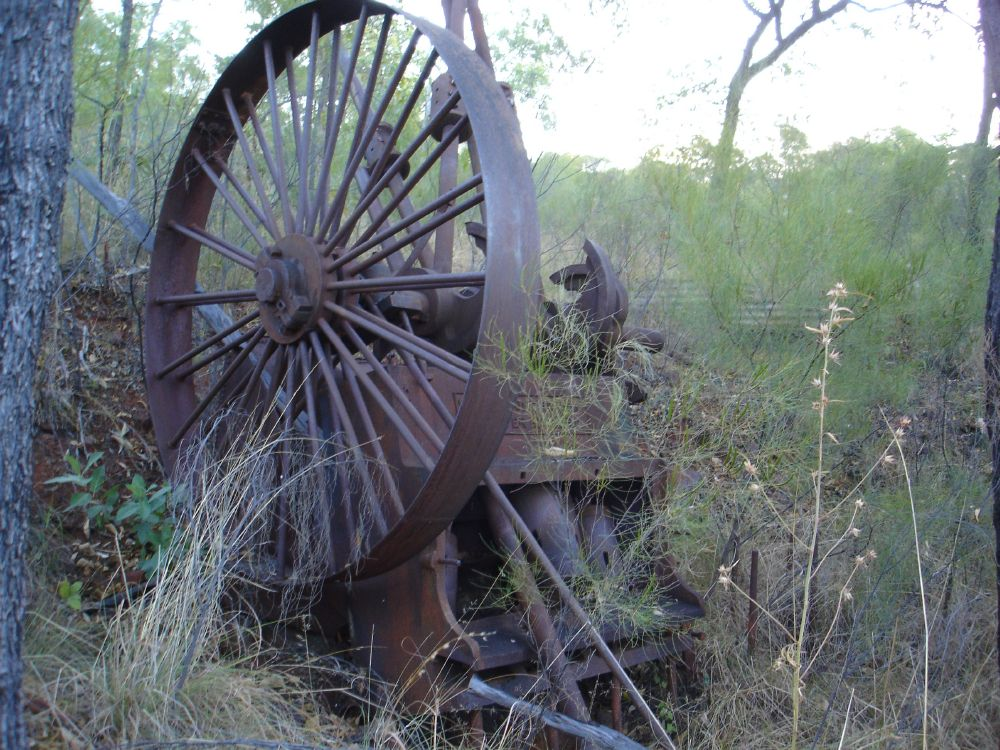
- Mount Moran Battery, 2009

- Location within Queensland Location within Australia
- 19.1412°S 143.4988°E
- Location: New Woolgar Road, Gilberton, Shire of Etheridge, Queensland, Australia

History
- Design period: 1919 - 1930s (interwar period)
- Built: 1924 - c. 1936

Queensland Heritage Register
- Official name: Mount Moran Battery
- Type: state heritage (archaeological)
- Designated: 22 September 2000
- Reference no.: 601921
- Significant period: 1924-1936 (fabric, historical)
- Significant components: pump, machinery/plant/equipment - mining/mineral processing, mine - open cut, well, battery/crusher/stamper/jaw breaker

Mount Moran Battery is a heritage-listed former stamper battery at New Woolgar Road, Gilberton, Shire of Etheridge, Queensland, Australia. It was built from 1924 to c. 1936. It was added to the Queensland Heritage Register on 22 September 2000.

== History ==
Mount Moran Battery is situated on a sloping ridge above the seasonally active Agate Creek, west of Forsayth. The isolated five head stamp battery was erected in 1924 to crush ore won from the three reefs worked in the area - the Mona, Iona and Bosker.

Gold was discovered in the Georgetown Mining District in 1868 and a series of gold and base metal discoveries followed. The region became known as the Etheridge Gold and Mineral Field. The field peaked as a gold producer in the 1890s but was in decline by World War I. High base metal prices turned attention to lead, silver and copper and the field boomed until the onset of the Depression in the late 1920s again caused prices to drop. A brief revival in gold mining followed but the labour and materials shortages of World War Two ended all mining.

During the early years of gold discoveries on the Etheridge field small amounts of alluvial gold were found in gullies around Mount Moran. Although it was not until the 1920s that the area produced three working gold reefs. Between 1922 and 1936 the three mines, the Mona, Iona and Bosker, yielded 1,033 ounces (29,300 g) of gold. Ore from the area was first crushed at the Ortona battery. By 1924 Mount Moran required its own crushing facilities. The ten head battery at Ortona, situated about 3 miles (4.8 km) from Mount Moran field, was relocated from Ortona to its present site.

In 1924 there was increased prospecting in the area with satisfactory results. Several new gold-bearing lodes were discovered, however most of the work was confined to the Finger Point mine. Here, the principal owners formed a syndicate and amalgamated their holdings in a 16 acres (6.5 ha) lease. The claims in the area were the Blue Spec, Bosker, Brown Hill, Dinkum, Finger Print, Lucky Hit, Iona and Peg Leg, with the deepest shafts of 22 and 27 metres (72 and 89 ft) being sunk on the Peg Leg and Finger Print respectively.

The 1930s saw a brief revival in the area then known as "the Mount Moran group of gold mines". In 1936 the Mount Moran Battery crushed 157 long tons (160 t) of ore to yield 58 ounces (1,600 g) of gold. However, there appears to have been no activity after this date. The Mount Moran Battery presumably ceased operation as the mines in the area closed.

== Description ==
The Mount Moran Battery contains the remains of a five head stamp battery including mortar box, stamper rods and belt wheel. The battery frame has been removed. A colonial boiler, the remains of a steam engine with fly wheel and several berdan pans are located alongside the stamp battery. A collapsed corrugated iron camp is located across a gully to the west of the battery. A small steam pump is located near a well on a watercourse east of the battery. The place includes several early open workings.

== Heritage listing ==
Mount Moran Battery was listed on the Queensland Heritage Register on 22 September 2000 having satisfied the following criteria.

The place is important in demonstrating the evolution or pattern of Queensland's history.

The Mount Moran Mine is important in demonstrating the evolution of Queensland's mining history, in particular the Etheridge Gold and Mineral Field. It contributes to an understanding of ore crushing technology utilised on a marginal lode and is an example of a small battery which was set up to crush ore for a few small mines in an isolated area of the remote field.
