= Castello aragonese (Ortona) =

Castle in Ortona, Italy

Coordinates: 42.3588°N 14.4061°E

Aragon Castle
- Castello aragonese
- Ortona
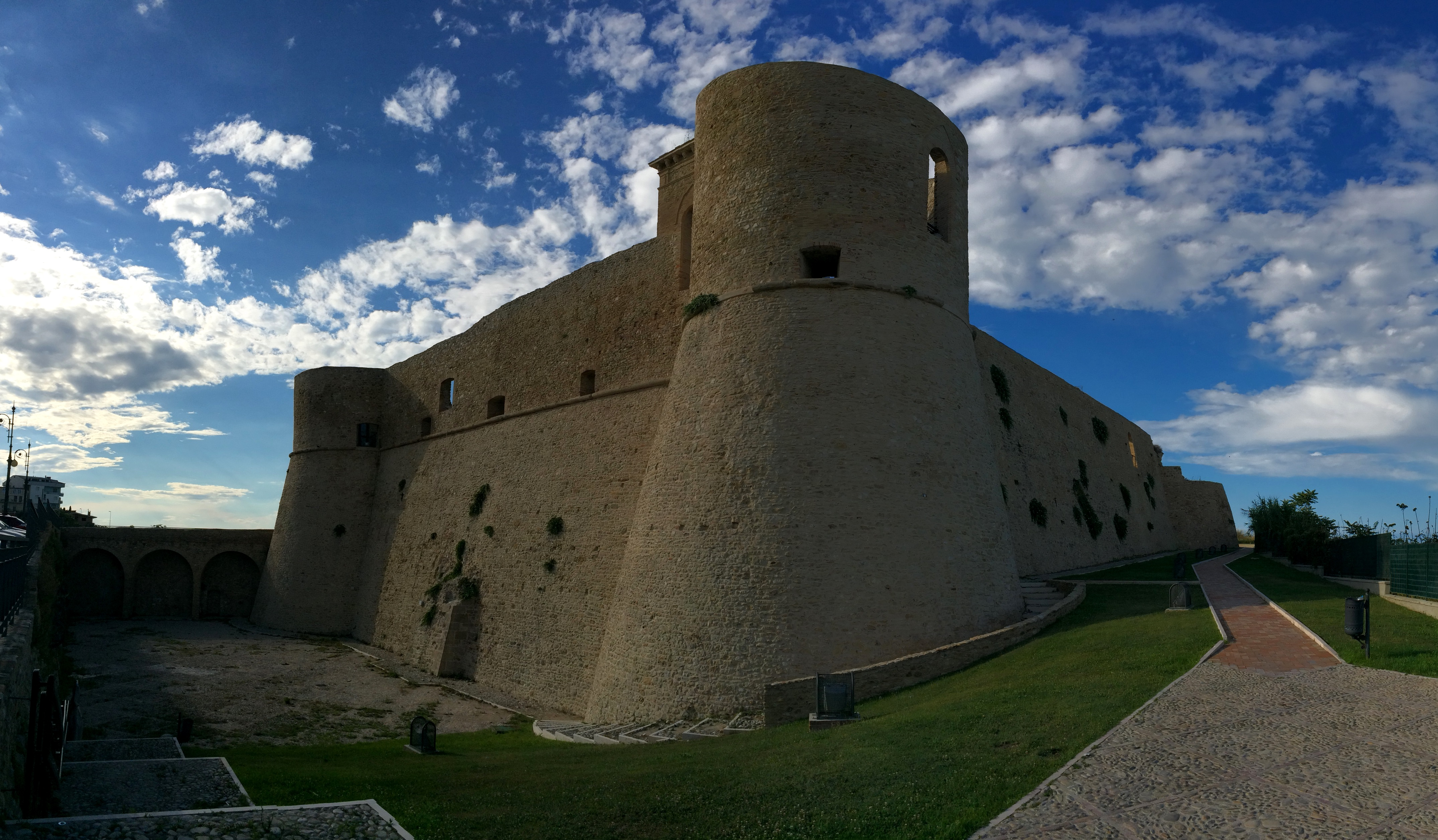
- Castle in Ortona

Site information
- Type: Castle

Location
- Location within Italy

Site history
- Built: 1452

Castello aragonese (Italian for Aragon Castle) is a Renaissance castle in Ortona, Province of Chieti (Abruzzo).

== History ==
The first building dates back to 1492. The Aragonese family built it over the old Caldora structure of the 14th century. This structure, however, dates back to the 13th century Angevin era. According to the same hypothesis, Giacomo Cavuto could have strengthened the castle that could have been pre-existent. In the 15th century, there were some adaptations and partial reconstructions of a pre-existing plant.

The castle was defensive until the 17th century when it was bought by the Baglioni family as a noble residence. A gentile palace was built inside the walls, which in the 19th century fell abandoned. Since then the castle was used as a workshop and powder. In 1943 during the Battle of Ortona, the castle was hit by German bombs and Canadian grenades. The gunpowder stored inside made the structure explode, all over the top of the walls and the noble palace skyrocketed. In '46 a landslide destroyed almost half of the castle, the one facing the sea from the tuff cliff.

== Architecture ==
The base is almost trapezoidal and it is characterized by four cylindrical corner towers (though only three have survived today) and curtains on a scarp. The west side was occupied by a residential building. Some photos of the early 1900s show the baron-like palace inside the 18th-century walls, reworked by the fortification control room.

Today the palace remains a piece of perimeter wall with decorations of the frame. The walls have a shoe plant, with two large circular towers placed on the side of Matteotti course, from where it is accessed today. The towers are typical of the period, because they have the largest shoe base, and the cylindrical central body with Gothic arch windows (those of the west tower are rectangular). On the west wall there is also a third smaller, always cylindrical tower, with an arched, arched window. The pavement of the base of the entrance side, with arcades on the masonry of the castle, makes it clear that the structure had a ditch of water.

The interior is accessible from a small garden bordering the walls, and from a ladder above the remains of a side tower. The interior is bare due to the destruction of the war and has been rehabilitated in the garden, with retaining the walls to the entrance side of the Matteott course. In fact, there are stairs leading to the basement of the castle, while a second staircase leads to the Museum of the West Tower: there are panels of the historical photos of the castle and furnishings of the noble families that possessed the structure.
