= Ortona =

- Comune
- Città di Ortona
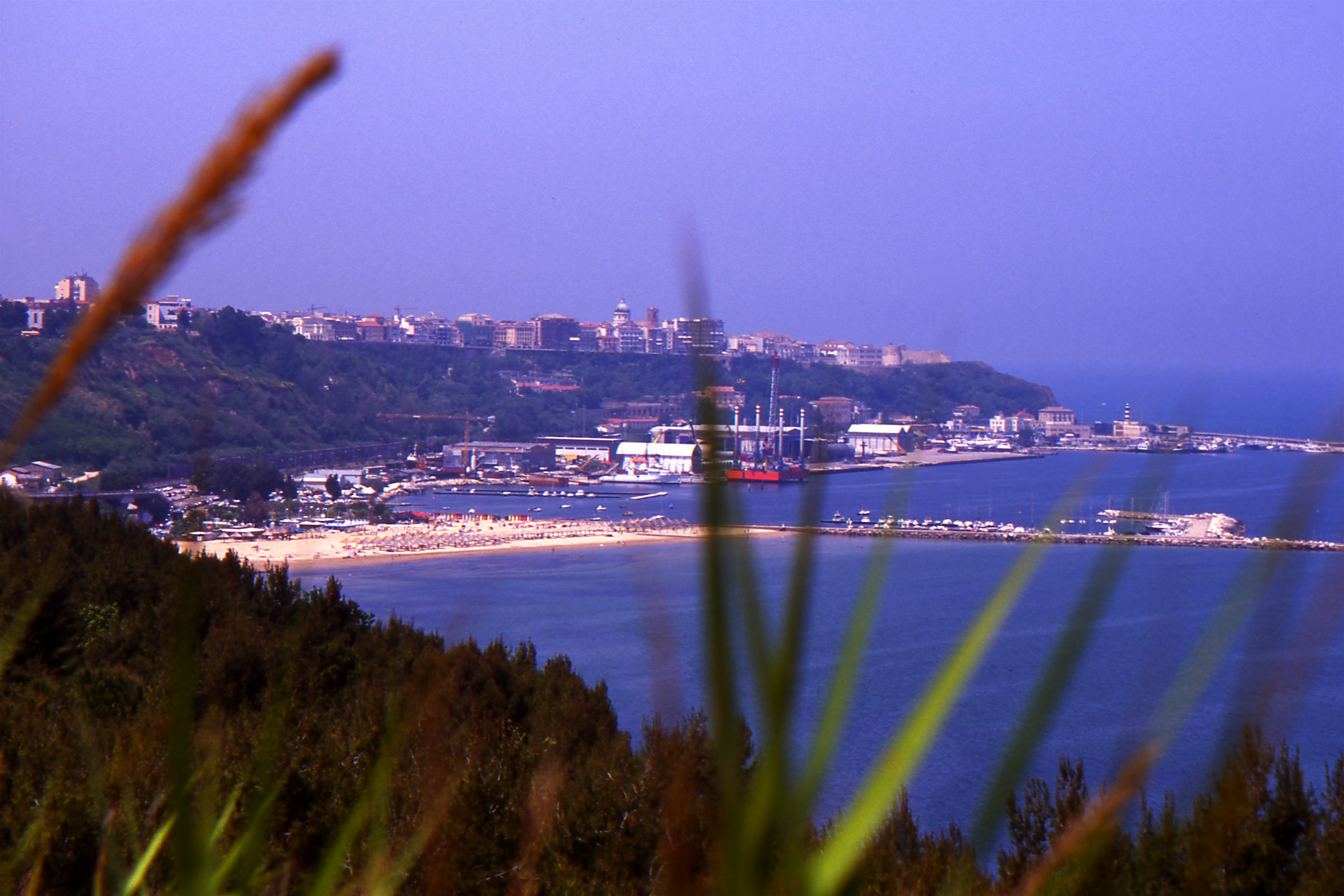
- A view of Ortona from the sea.

- Coat of arms

- Location within Italy Location within Abruzzo
- Coordinates: 42°21′N 14°24′E
- Country: Italy
- Region: Abruzzo
- Province: Chieti (CH)
- Frazioni: Alboreto, Aquilano, Caldari, Colombo, Cucullo, Feudo, Fontegrande, Foro, Fossato, Gagliarda, Iurisci, Lazzaretto, Lido Riccio, Madonna delle Grazie, Ranchini, Riccio, Ripari Bardella, Rogatti, Ruscitti, San Donato, San Leonardo, San Marco, San Pietro, Santa Lucia, Savini, Tamarete, Vaccari, Villa Deo, Villa Grande, Villa Iubatti, Villa Pincione, Villa San Leonardo, Villa San Nicola, Villa San Tommaso, Villa Torre

Government
  - Mayor: Angelo Di Nardo

Area
  - Total: 70.88 km^{2} (27.37 sq mi)
- Elevation: 72 m (236 ft)

Population (1 January 2023)
  - Total: 22,209
  - Density: 313.3/km^{2} (811.5/sq mi)
- Demonym: Ortonesi
- Time zone: UTC+1 (CET)
  - Summer (DST): UTC+2 (CEST)
- Postal code: 66026
- Dialing code: 085
- Patron saint: St. Thomas
- Saint day: First Sunday of May
- Website: Official website

Ortona (Abruzzese: Urtónë; Ancient Greek: Ὄρτων, romanized: Órtōn) is a coastal town and municipality of the Province of Chieti in the Italian region of Abruzzo, with some 23,000 inhabitants.

In 1943, Ortona was the site of the bloody Battle of Ortona, known as "Western Stalingrad". A patron saint of Ortona is Saint Thomas the Apostle (Tommaso), whose relics were brought to Ortona in the 13th century by a sailor and are kept in the Cathedral of Saint Thomas.

== History ==
The origins of Ortona are uncertain. Presumably, it was first inhabited by the Frentani, an Italic population. In 2005, during works near the Castle, a Bronze Age settlement was discovered, and the Roman town largely coincided with this first settlement. Some sections of paved roads and urban walls, as well as some archaeological findings are the only remains of this period. Ortona remained a part of the Eastern Roman Empire for several centuries, before it was annexed by the Kingdom of the Lombards. In 803, the Franks incorporated Ortona into the county of Chieti. From that date on, the town remained tied to Chieti and its territory.

In 1258, the relics of the Apostle Thomas were brought to Ortona by the sailor Leone Acciaiuoli. In 1302 the Croatian lord George Šubić raided Ortona and extracted tribute from its denizens. In the first half of the 15th century, its walls were built, and during this period Ortona fought with the nearby town of Lanciano in a fierce war that ended in 1427. On June 30, 1447, ships from Venice destroyed the port of Ortona; consequently the King of Sicily at that time commissioned the construction of a Castle to dominate the renovated port. In 1582, the town was acquired by Margaret of Parma, daughter of Emperor Charles V and Duchess of Parma. In 1584 Margaret decided to build a great mansion (known as Palazzo Farnese), which was never completed due to her death.

After the establishment of the Kingdom of Italy in 1860, Ortona became one of the first sea resorts on the Adriatic Sea. On 9 September 1943, the royal family of the House of Savoy left German-occupied Italy from the port of Ortona. The defensive Gustav Line was established by the Germans at Ortona (extending towards Cassino on the opposite side of Italy). Ortona offered the Allies a supply port on the Adriatic and was fiercely defended by the Germans. The struggle between the German paratroopers and the 2nd Canadian Infantry Brigade attracted the attention of the international press, leading the Battle of Ortona to be known as "Little Stalingrad."

== Transport ==
Ortona is served from Port of Ortona, an important port of Adriatic Sea.

== Main sights ==
- Cathedral of San Tommaso (relics of saint Thomas the Apostle)
- Cathedral Museum
- Church of Santa Maria di Costantinopoli
- Church of Santa Caterina d'Alessandria
- Lighthouse
- Medieval Aragona Castle
- Museum of Ortona battle
- Moro River Canadian War Cemetery
- Trabucchi (fishing machines) on sea

Ortona is home of several beaches that appeal to tourists and one historical museum based on the battle of Ortona. The Abruzzo, Lazio and Molise National Park is not far either.

== Twin towns and sister cities ==
Ortona is twinned with:

- Cassino, Italy, since 1991
- Volgograd, Russia, since 2013
- Metković, Croatia, since 2016

== People ==
- The composer Francesco Paolo Tosti was born in Ortona.
- The pornstar Rocco Siffredi was born in Ortona.

== Climate ==
Climate data for Ortona, elevation 68 m (223 ft), (1951–2000)
Month	Jan	Feb	Mar	Apr	May	Jun	Jul	Aug	Sep	Oct	Nov	Dec	Year
Record high °C (°F)	23.3 (73.9)	23.8 (74.8)	27.8 (82.0)	25.2 (77.4)	33.3 (91.9)	34.5 (94.1)	39.2 (102.6)	39.2 (102.6)	34.0 (93.2)	30.5 (86.9)	29.0 (84.2)	23.7 (74.7)	39.2 (102.6)
Mean daily maximum °C (°F)	10.4 (50.7)	10.9 (51.6)	13.5 (56.3)	16.2 (61.2)	20.7 (69.3)	25.0 (77.0)	28.1 (82.6)	28.2 (82.8)	24.9 (76.8)	20.6 (69.1)	15.1 (59.2)	11.8 (53.2)	18.8 (65.8)
Daily mean °C (°F)	7.8 (46.0)	8.1 (46.6)	10.5 (50.9)	13.1 (55.6)	17.5 (63.5)	21.6 (70.9)	24.5 (76.1)	24.5 (76.1)	21.3 (70.3)	17.4 (63.3)	12.3 (54.1)	9.2 (48.6)	15.7 (60.2)
Mean daily minimum °C (°F)	5.2 (41.4)	5.4 (41.7)	7.4 (45.3)	10.0 (50.0)	14.3 (57.7)	18.2 (64.8)	20.9 (69.6)	20.8 (69.4)	17.7 (63.9)	14.2 (57.6)	9.5 (49.1)	6.6 (43.9)	12.5 (54.5)
Record low °C (°F)	−5.5 (22.1)	−1.5 (29.3)	−3.0 (26.6)	2.8 (37.0)	7.5 (45.5)	8.5 (47.3)	14.4 (57.9)	11.3 (52.3)	10.0 (50.0)	4.0 (39.2)	0.4 (32.7)	−2.0 (28.4)	−5.5 (22.1)
Average precipitation mm (inches)	62.9 (2.48)	50.2 (1.98)	57.3 (2.26)	49.7 (1.96)	36.8 (1.45)	36.9 (1.45)	34.4 (1.35)	47.7 (1.88)	64.6 (2.54)	79.9 (3.15)	87.7 (3.45)	83.0 (3.27)	691.1 (27.22)
Average precipitation days	7.2	6.8	7.1	6.4	5.4	4.7	3.6	4.0	5.4	7.2	8.3	8.0	74.1
Source: Regione Abruzzo

== Sources ==
- Christie, N. M. (2001). Hard-won Victory: the Canadians at Ortona 1943. Ottawa: CEF Books.
- Zuehlke, Mark (1999). Ortona: Canada's epic World War II battle. Toronto: Stoddart.
