= Ortona Lighthouse =

Ortona
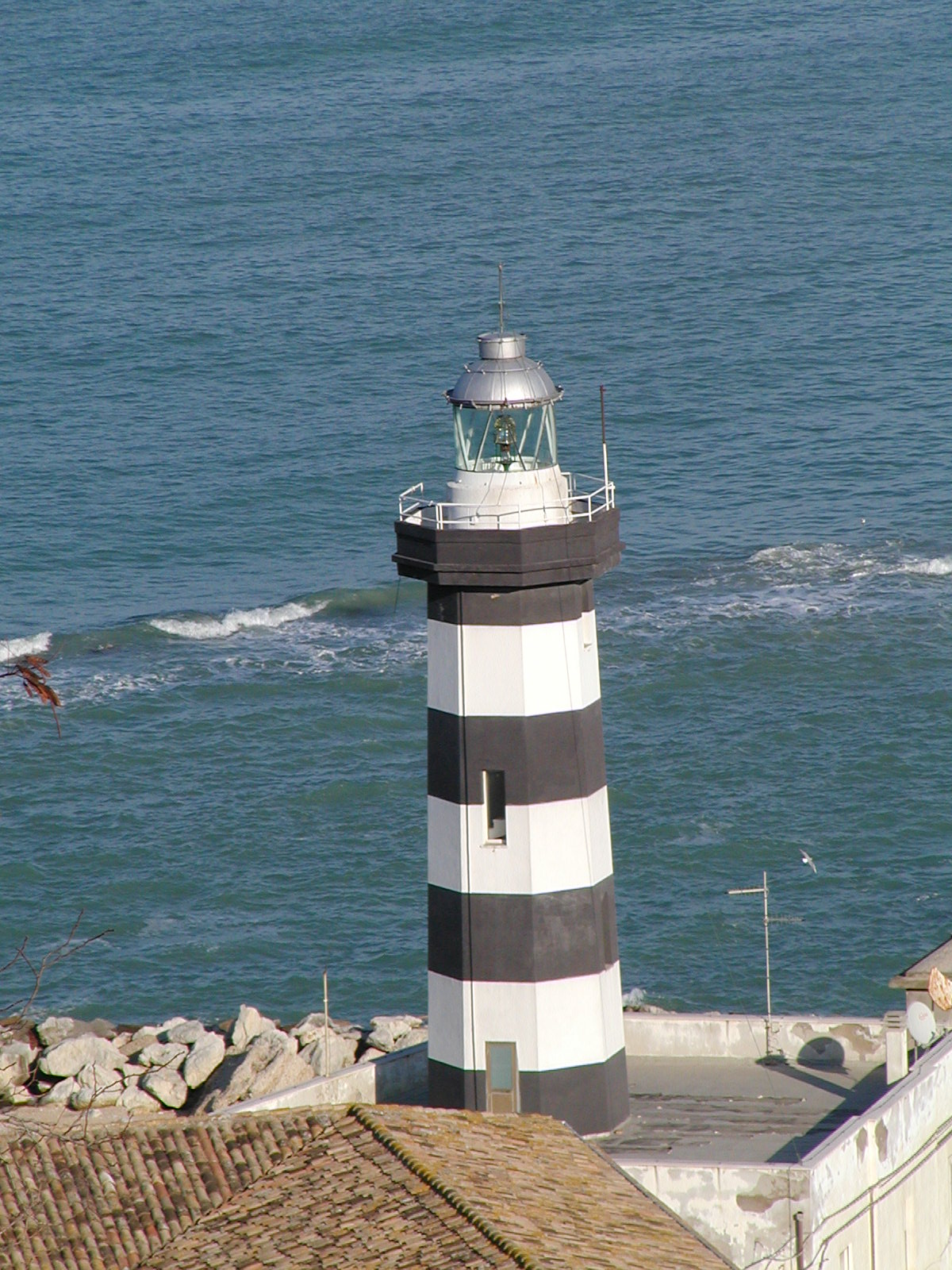
- Ortona Lighthouse
- Location: Ortona; Abruzzo; Italy
- Coordinates: 42°21′33″N 14°24′31″E

Tower
- Constructed: 1937
- Construction: concrete tower
- Height: 24 metres (79 ft)
- Shape: octagonal prism tower with balcony and lantern
- Markings: tower with black and white bands, grey metallic lantern dome
- Operator: Marina Militare

Light
- Focal height: 23 metres (75 ft)
- Lens: Type OF 375
- Light source: electric power distribution
- Intensity: AL 1000 w
- Range: main: 15 nautical miles (28 km; 17 mi) reserve: 11 nautical miles (20 km; 13 mi)
- Characteristic: Fl (2) W 6s.
- Italy no.: 3864 E.F.

Ortona Lighthouse (Italian: Faro di Ortona) is an active lighthouse located in Ortona on the Adriatic Sea.

== Description ==
The lighthouse was built in 1937 and consists of an octagonal prism tower 24 metres (79 ft) high, painted black and with horizontal bands, atop a 2-story keeper's house with a balcony and lantern. The lantern, which mounts a Type OF 375 optic, is painted gray metallic, is positioned at 23 metres (75 ft) above sea level and emits two white flashes in a six-second period, visible up to a distance of 15 nautical miles (28 km; 17 mi). The lighthouse is completely automated and it is managed by the Marina Militare, it has the identification code number 3864 E.F.

== See also ==
- List of lighthouses in Italy
