= Undara Volcanic National Park =

National park in Australia

- IUCN category II (national park)
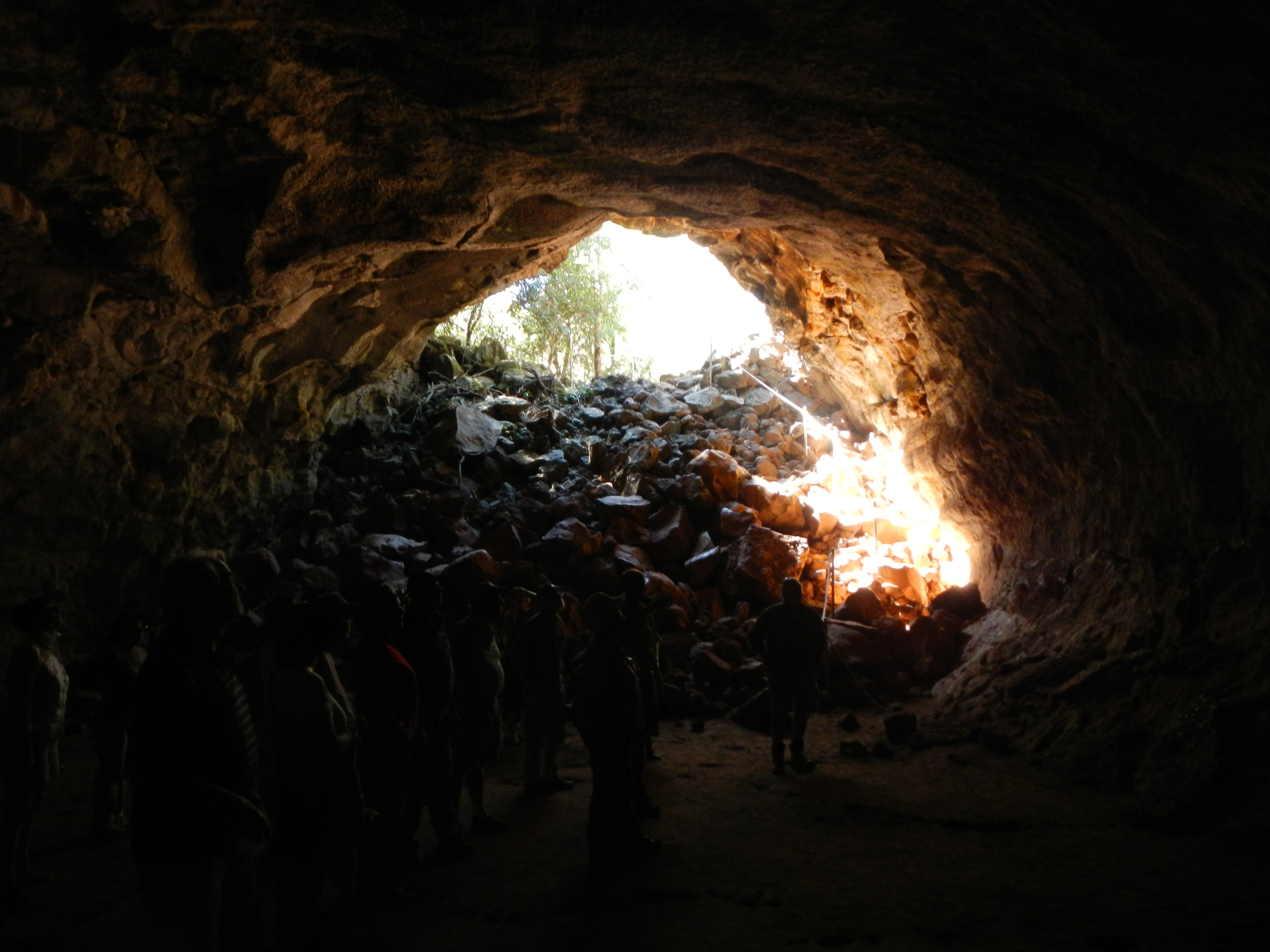
- Undara Lava Tubes

- Location within Queensland
- Location: Queensland
- Nearest city: Mount Surprise, Queensland
- Coordinates: 18°12′4″S 144°35′46″E
- Area: 615 km^{2} (237 sq mi)
- Established: 1989
- Governing body: Queensland Parks and Wildlife Service

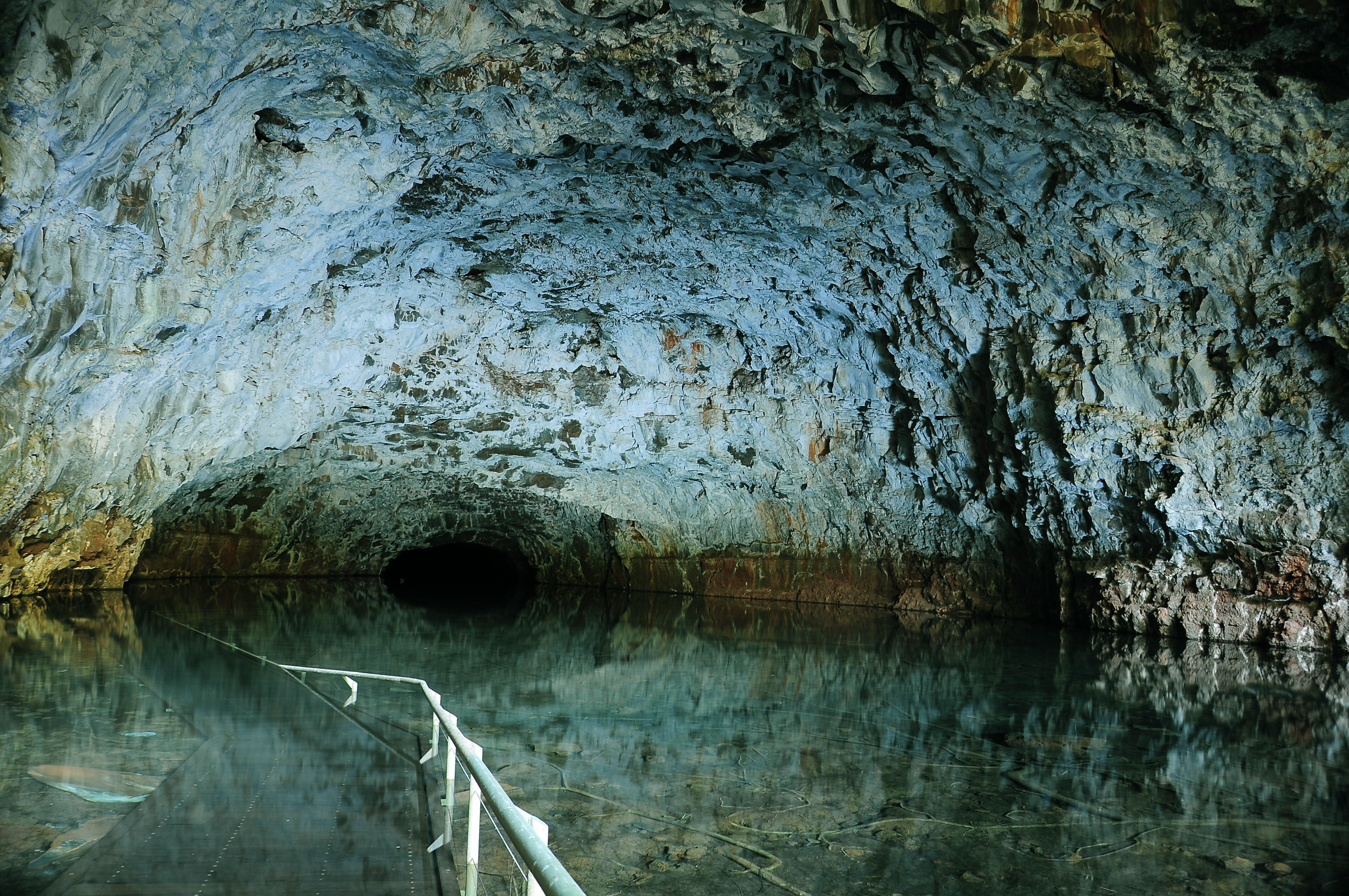
Undara Lava Tubes

The Undara Volcanic National Park is a national park in the Shire of Etheridge, Queensland, Australia. It is situated 275 kilometres (171 mi) southwest of Cairns just off the Gulf Developmental Road. The park was established in 1989 to protect Australia's longest lava tube and the unique fauna and flora found of the area. The basalts of the area form part of the Cenozoic McBride Basalt (Volcanic) Province. The volcanics are all less than 8 million years old (Ma) with the youngest only 7,000 years old.

== Location ==
The Undara Volcanic National Park is situated 437 kilometres (272 mi) northwest of Townsville and 275 kilometres (171 mi) southwest of Cairns, the two major regional centres of North Queensland. The National Park is 58 kilometres (36 mi) by road from the small town of Mount Surprise. The National Park is approximately 61,500 hectares (152,000 acres) in area. The climate is monsoonal and is generally hot and humid. It can be very wet from October to late March. The drier cooler months are April to August.

The Queensland Department of Environment and Science consider much of the park dangerous for unguided visitors because of a combination of concealed holes where lava tubes have collapsed, high carbon dioxide in some of the tubes and a confusing landscape. As such visits to the tubes is by guide only. The Kalkani Crater is accessible without a guide.

== History ==
Undara is an Aboriginal word for 'a long way'. The Ewamian (pronounced your-amin) Aboriginal people are the traditional owners of the national park.

European people moved into the area in the 1860s and prior the national park being declared the area was used for cattle grazing. The lava tubes were well recognised by 1891 and had unmanaged intermittent visits. Guided tours commenced in 1989.

Prior to the formation of the national park the area was owned by the Collins Family who settled in the region in 1862. The family had developed infrastructure (known now as the Undara Experience) before the park formation and they were given a special business lease to continue the tourist operation after the national park was declared.

In 2009 as part of the Q150 celebrations, the Undara Volcanic National Park was announced as one of the Q150 Icons of Queensland for its role as a "Natural attraction". The park management plan has a focus of protecting the geological values and enhancing visitor service and facilities.

== Geology ==
The Undara Volcanic National Park lies within the McBride Basalt (Volcanic) Province which is one of 11 discontinuous Cenozoic volcanic regions in north Queensland. The McBride Basalt Province is around 5,500 square kilometres (2,100 sq mi) in area.

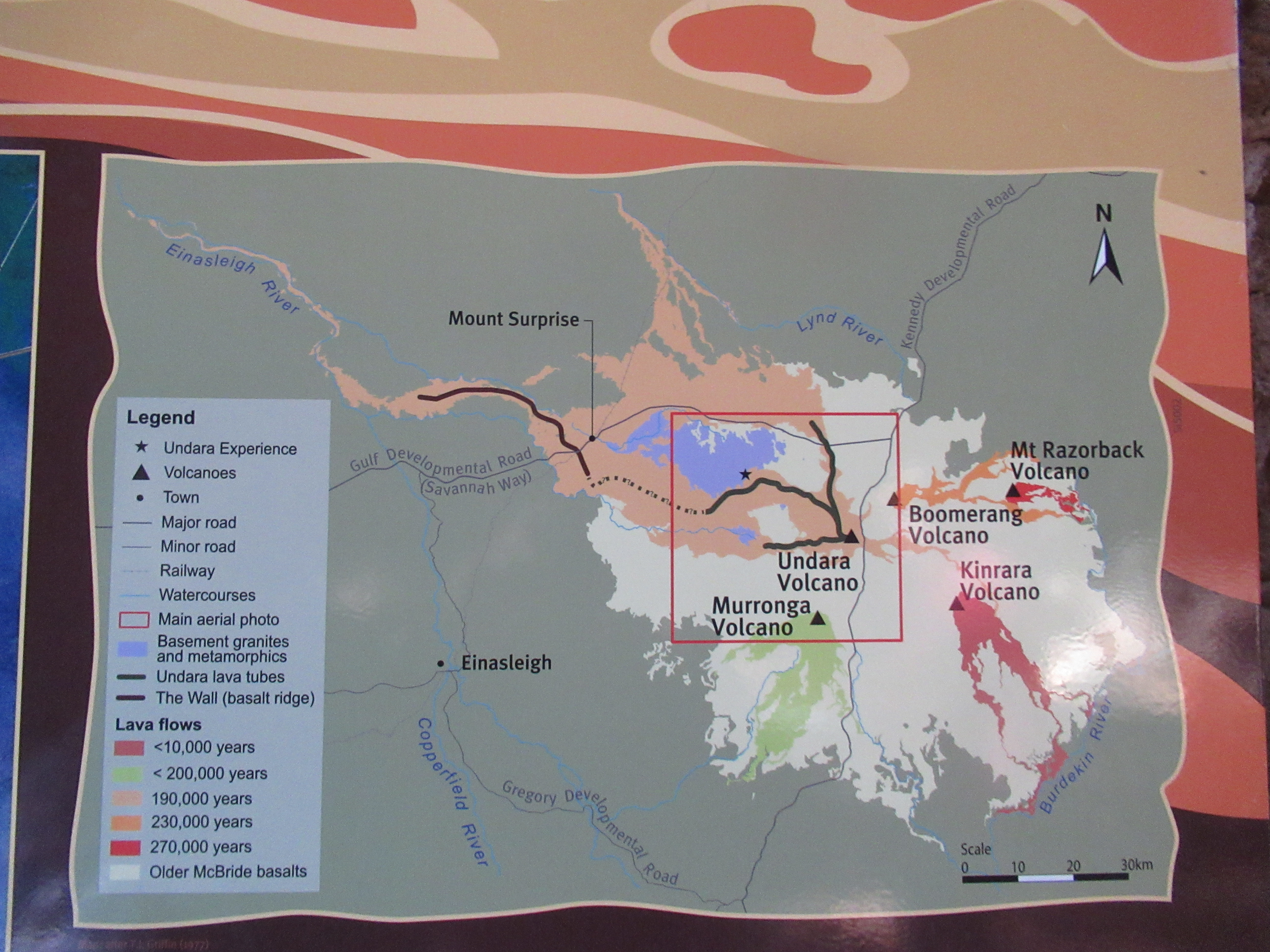
Geological sketch map of the Undara National Park formations.

A total of 164 eruption centres (volcanoes, vents and cones) have been identified within the McBride Basalt Province. Remnants of older flows dated at around 8 million years occur outside of the national park. The majority of flows are less than 8 million years. The volcanic activity that formed the tubes occurred approximately 190,000 years ago and the Undara volcano expelled massive amounts of lava onto the surrounding Atherton Tableland, covering about 1550 square kilometres. In total it was estimated that over 23 billion cubic metres (810×10^{9} cu ft) of lava was released.

Thermal insulation provided by the solidification of a crust above actively flowing magma is required to produce long lava flows. The longest of the Undara flows is approximately 160 kilometres (99 mi) with an average gradient of 0.3°. Lava tubes occur up to 30 kilometres (19 mi) from the Undara Crater and up to 5 successive flow units, demarcated by Pahoehoe surfaces, have been identified in the walls of some of the caves.

Bayliss Cave is the remains of a lava tube that was once over 100 kilometres (62 mi) in length. The cave itself is over 1,300 metres (4,265 ft) in length, 11 metres (36 ft) high and 22 metres (72 ft) wide. It is described as a "bad air cave" with measured carbon dioxide levels as high as 5.9%.

== Fauna and flora ==
The Queensland Department of Environment and Science have recognised more than 120 species of bird including the vulnerable Red Goshawk. E-bird has recorded 132 species at Undara Experience just on the northern edge of the park.

Undara Volcanic National Park is home to four insectivorous or micro bats; the Bent-wing Bat, the Eastern Cave Bat, the Northern Horseshoe Bat (alternative name: Eastern Horseshoe Bat) and the Coastal Sheath-tailed Bat. The large number of bats provide food for various snakes and birds of prey, such as barking owls. Bayllis Cave is one of the world’s most biologically diverse caves. The cave has recorded 52 resident species including the most diverse assemblage of arthropods found in a north Queensland Cave.

The national park is also home to a wide range of macroropods including the Common Wallaroos, the Antilopine Wallaroo and the Northern Quoll.

Much of the national park is dry savanna woodland but the lava tubes and collapse areas now provide an environment for other vegetation to flourish in the damp interiors. The lava tubes show up as rich green vine thickets that have strong affinities with Gondwana species. The rare white-flowered onion vine occurs within the park's vine thickets.

== Gallery ==
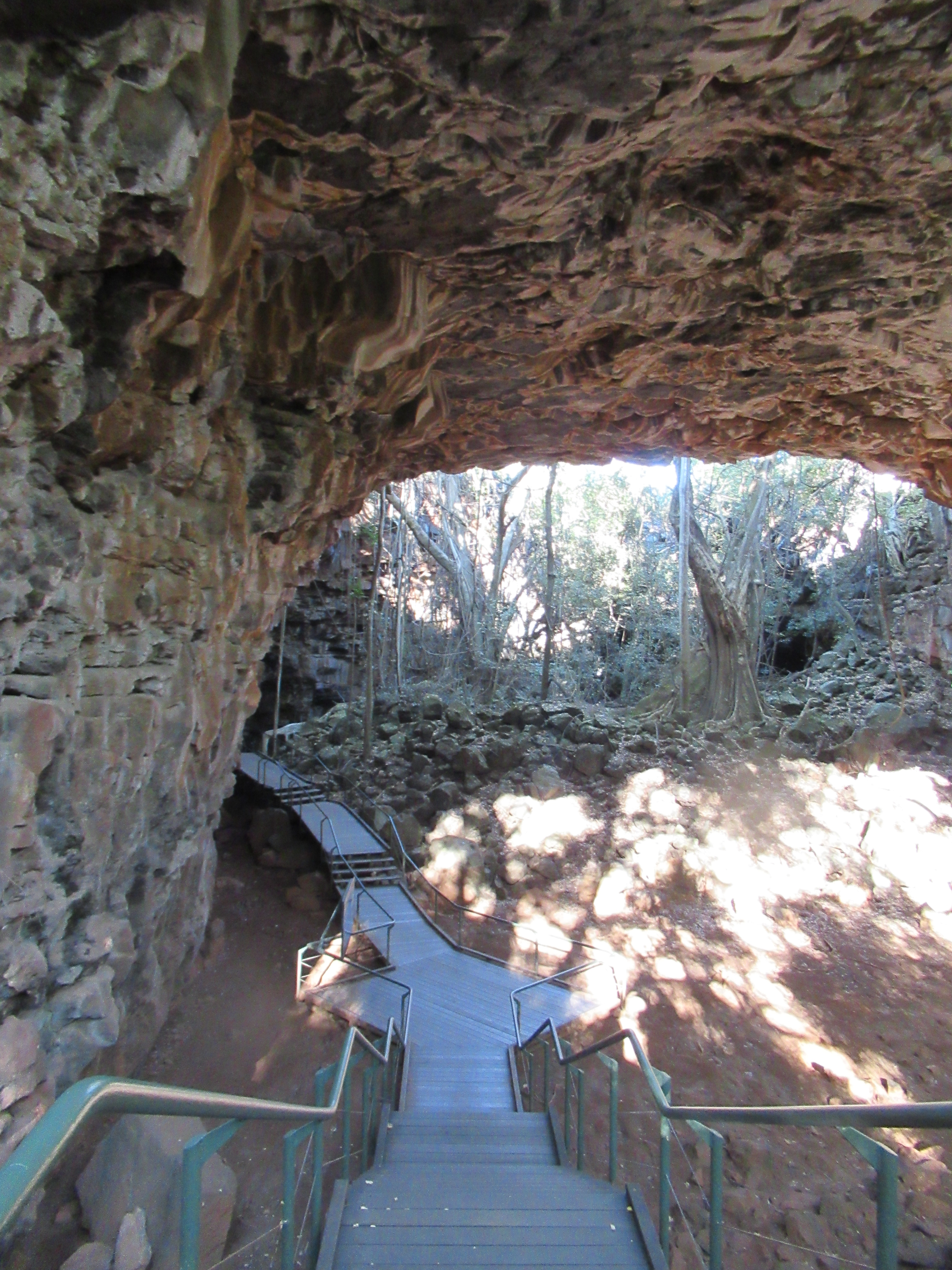
Archway cave, looking out

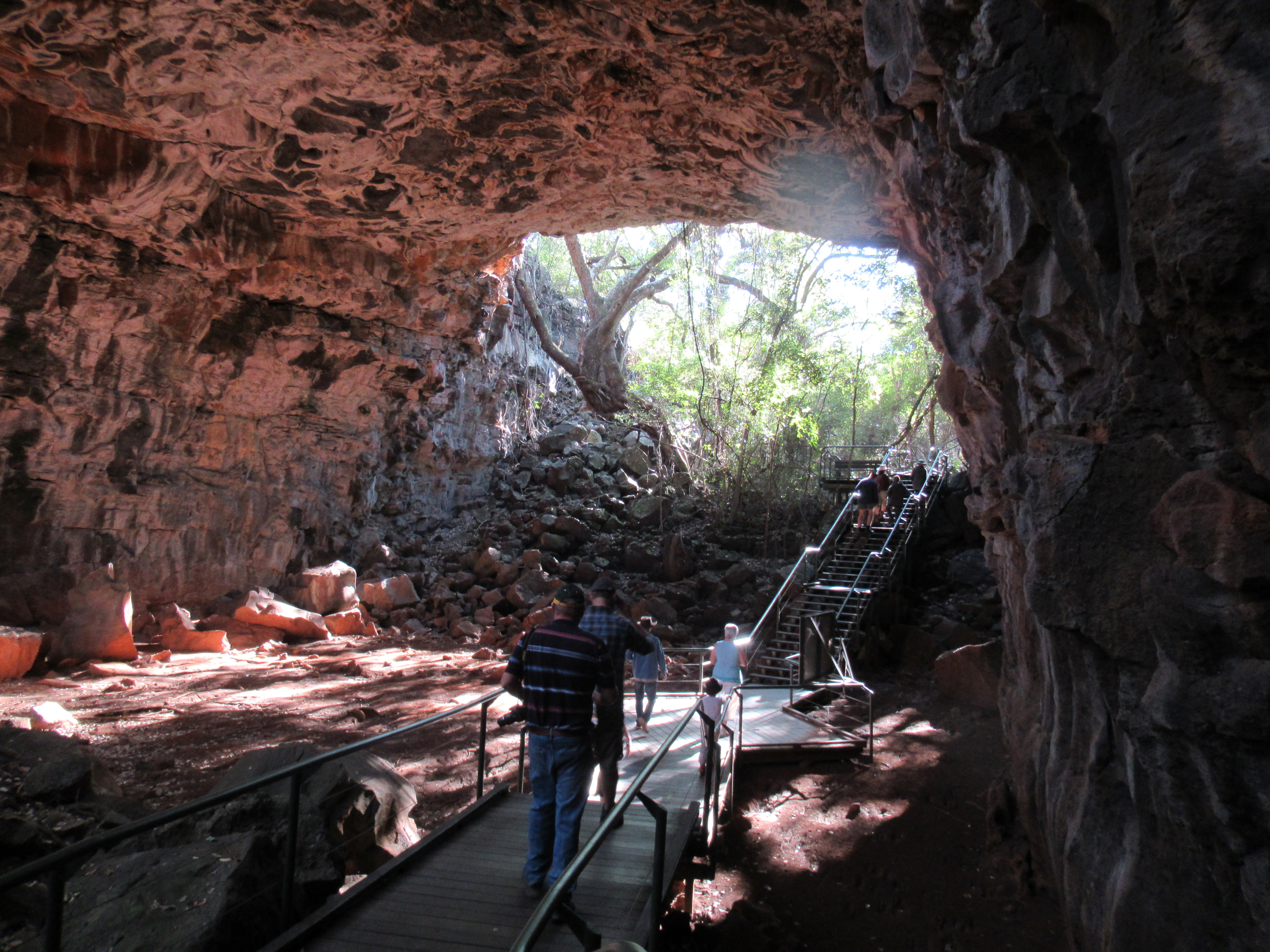
Archway cave, looking out

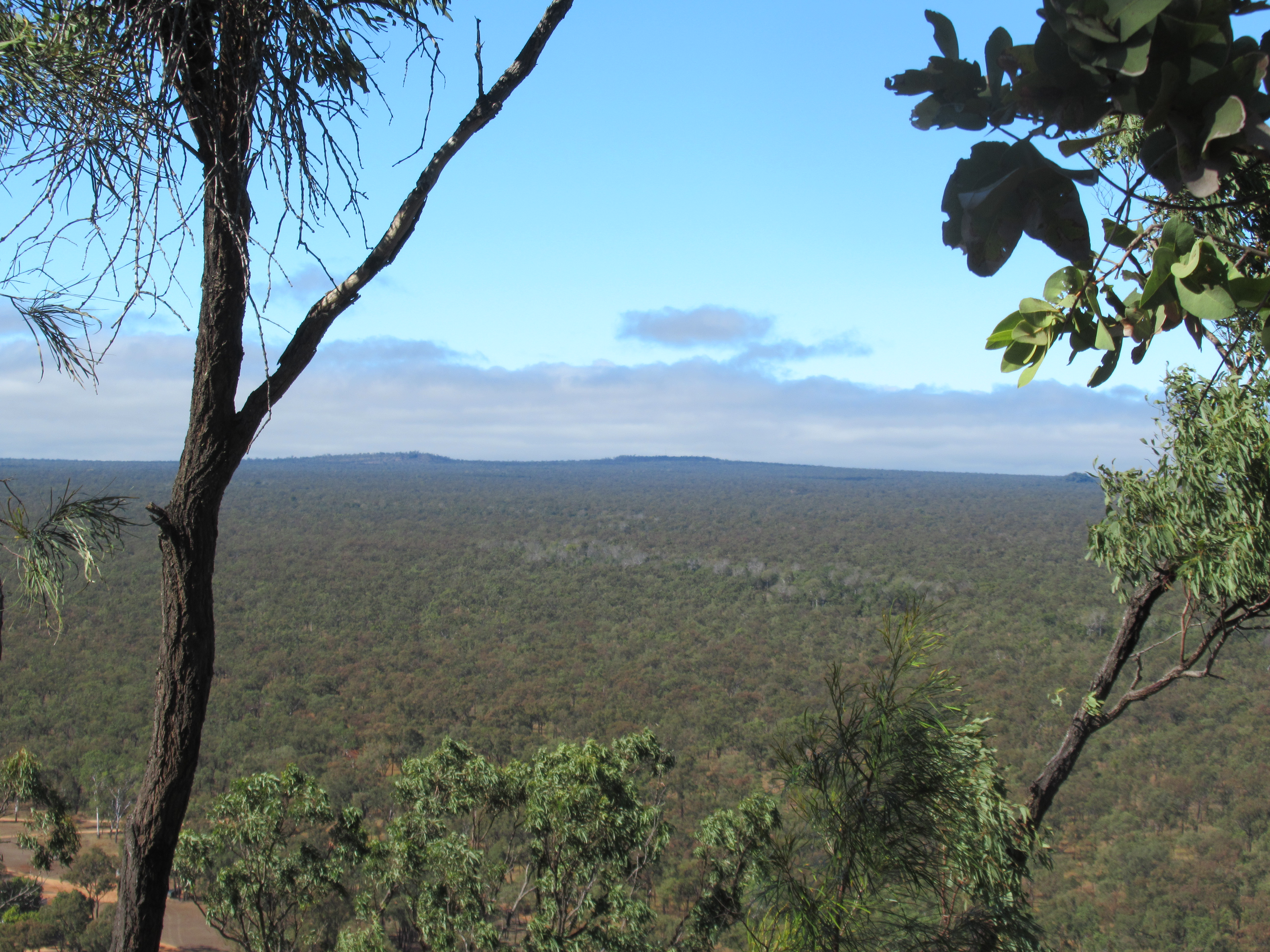
A view from the rim of Kalkani Crater. Undara Crater in the distance. Line of pale vegetation traces a lava tube.

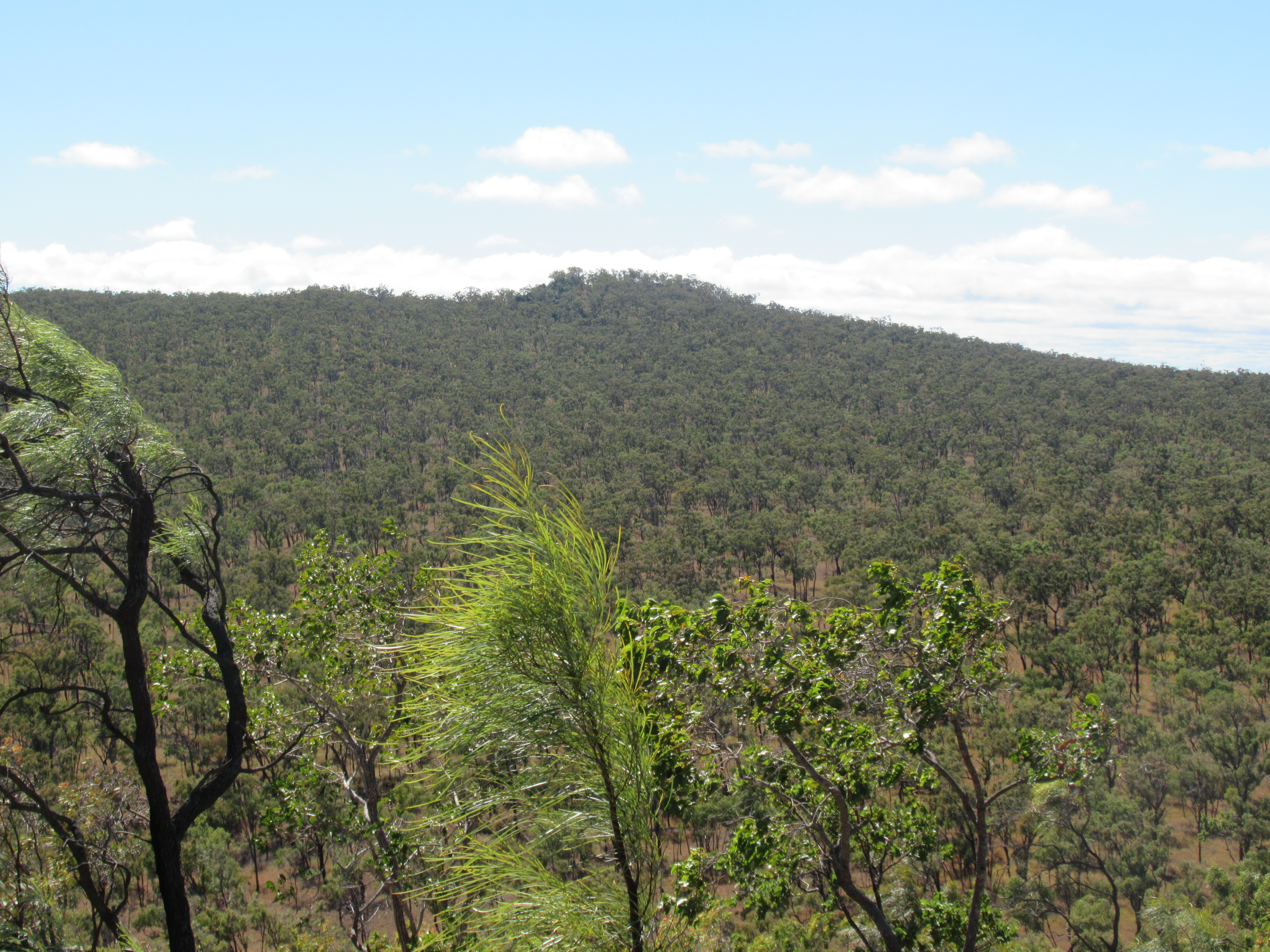
A view from the rim of Kalkani Crater. Silent Hill, a shield volcano, in the distance.

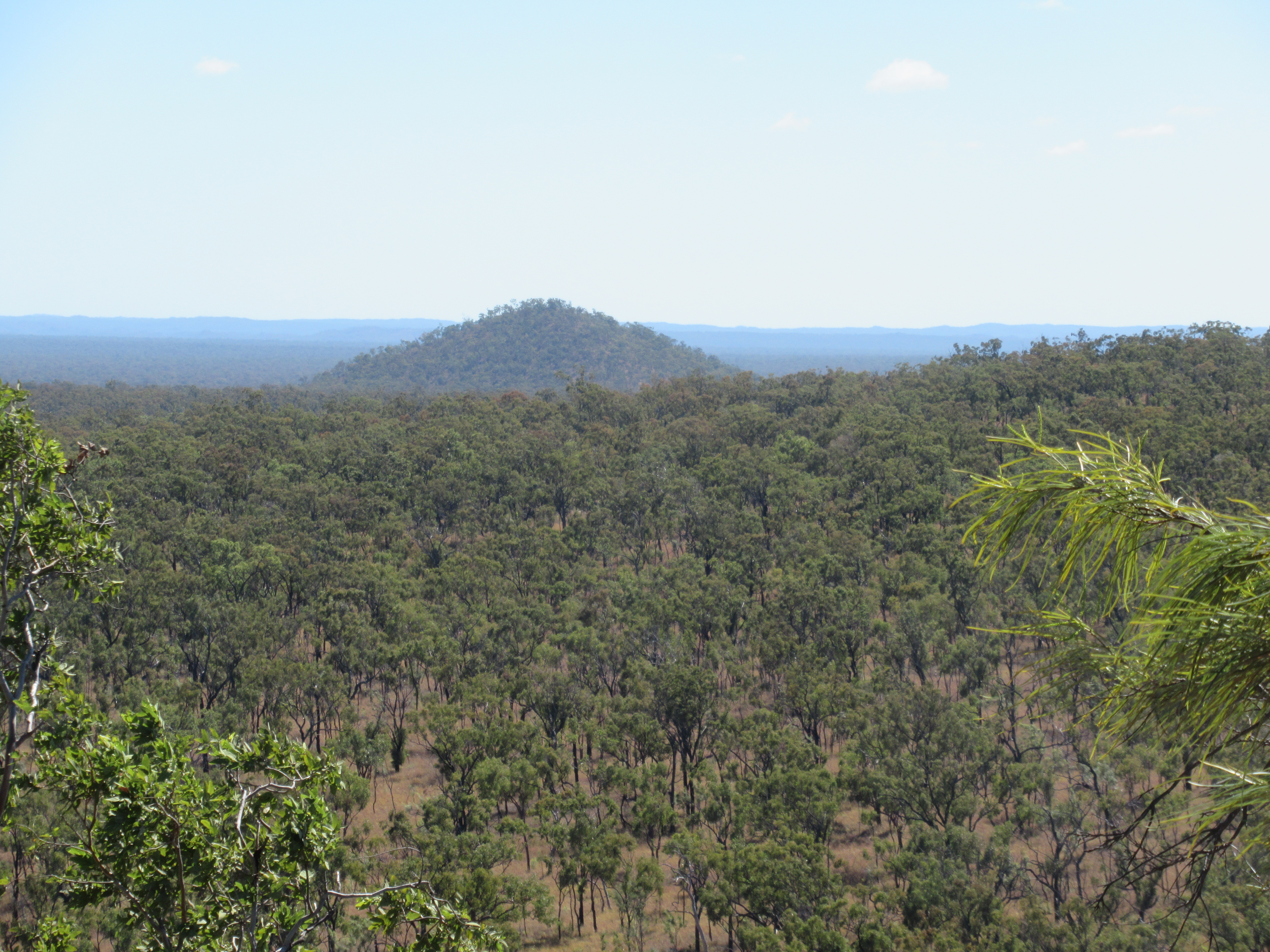
A view from the rim of Kalkani Crater. Rangaranga Hill, a scoria cone in the distance.

== See also ==
- Protected areas of Queensland
