= Ortona Mine and Battery =

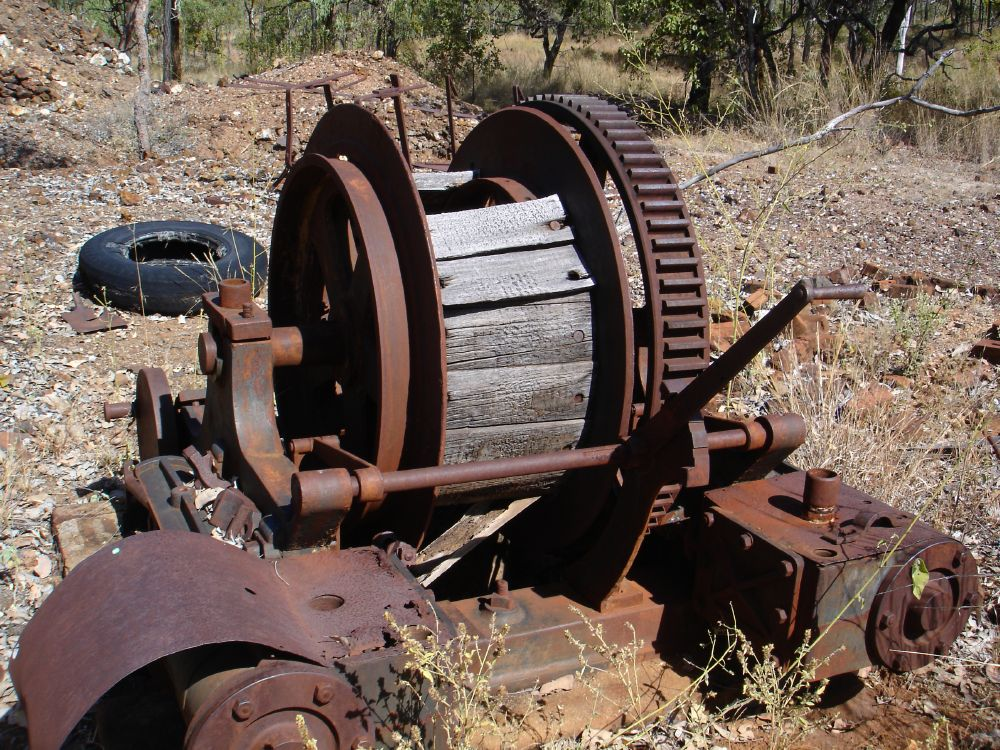
- Ortona Mine and Battery, 2009

- Location within Queensland Location within Australia
- 19.1726°S 143.5058°E
- Location: Forsayth-Agate Creek - Ortona (Iona) Station Road, Gilberton, Shire of Etheridge, Queensland, Australia

History
- Design period: 1870s - 1890s (late 19th century)
- Built: 1899 - 1908

Queensland Heritage Register
- Official name: Ortona Mine and Battery
- Type: state heritage (built, archaeological)
- Designated: 25 August 2000
- Reference no.: 601856
- Significant period: 1899-1908 (fabric); 1899-1908, 1919 (historical)
- Significant components: workshop, machinery/plant/equipment - mining/mineral processing, grave marker, mine - open cut, battery/crusher/stamper/jaw breaker, shaft, burial/grave, battery shed

Ortona Mine and Battery is a heritage-listed mine at Forsayth-Agate Creek - Ortona (Iona) Station Road, Gilberton, Shire of Etheridge, Queensland, Australia. It was built from 1899 to 1908. It was added to the Queensland Heritage Register on 25 August 2000.

== History ==
The Ortona Mine and Battery is located 100 kilometres (62 mi) south of Georgetown and is the most isolated copper mine and treatment plant in the Georgetown Mining District. The mine appears to have operated only briefly, from 1899 to 1908. The remote location of Ortona Mine created difficulties with developing the ore reserves.

Gold was discovered in the Georgetown Mining District in 1868 and a series of other gold and base metal discoveries followed. The region became known as the Etheridge Gold and Mineral Field. The field peaked as a gold producer in the 1890s but was in decline by World War I. High base metal prices turned attention to lead, silver and copper and the field boomed until the onset of the Depression in the late 1920s again caused prices to drop. A brief revival in gold mining followed but the labour and materials shortages of World War II ended all mining.

The Ortona Mine copper lodes were discovered in 1899 by Scarden and Smyth, two prospectors. In 1901 Scarden and Smyth sold the mine to Anthony Linedale. Linedale was reportedly working in association with John Moffat and the Irvinebank Mining Company. Cartage and treatment costs were very high and many mines starting up in the early 1900s could not afford to stay in business. Linedale, however, was able to make a profit by sending copper ore to Townsville by teams and then transported the copper on to London.

Between 1899 and 1908 about 145 long tons (147 t) of rich ore was sent for smelting. Records of 1908 show that 2,345 long tons (2,383 t) of ore were stacked ready for treatment, waiting for the completion of a reverberatory furnace. The mine was exploited to the water level by shafts and drives. With the use of an engine and baling tank one shaft was extended to 47 metres (154 ft) below water level. A crushing plant was later erected. However, there is no evidence of a furnace or any slag in the area so it is not known whether the furnace did become operational, or even for how long the mines operated. However records show that in 1910. Linedale's company constructed a road from their Ortona mine to Forsayth to connect with the Etheridge Railway.

An undated map of Ortona shows a cottage and office with a well and another office nearby, on the bank of the Percy River. On the same side of the river, further south, a hotel and kitchen apparently owned by August Kremens are located. On the opposite bank another hotel and kitchen, under the name of George Daly Ryan and next to it, a butcher shop with the name John Henry Clarke are also marked.

A brief revival of the Ortona Mine in 1919 was prompted by new gold finds. Although this engendered some activity, miners were by then deserting the area. Later prospectors and fossickers were discouraged by a lack of available explosives, as well as ongoing drought conditions, and seemed unprepared to work such an isolated area.

== Description ==
Ortona Mine and Battery is situated on the banks of the Percy River on a large area of land that crosses a series of small seasonally active creeks. The place comprises early mine workings and the surviving components of a mill and mining camp. All of the components are located in close association.

The mine workings comprise three groups of shallow open workings and a shaft. Surviving crushing and concentrating plant located on the site of the mill shed includes a jaw crusher, jigs, tables and a flat bed steam engine. The mill shed has mostly collapsed, although some of the bush timber uprights and part of the roof frame, with corrugated iron sheets, remains standing. The nearby workshop, which is similarly constructed, has partly collapsed around a tractor with a front loading scoop.

A boiler and a compressor are located in association with shafts and workings at the western end of the place. Adjacent are the remains of two small buildings constructed with flagstone surfaces and stone pitched wall sections. The purpose of these structures is not evident, although they may have been lock-up stores. The camp comprises the remains of a corrugated iron shed and a stove and fridge.

Several graves, including one with a headstone, are located in the proximity of the camp.

Artefacts and cultural features are numerous in both amount and variety. Bottle fragments are extremely common but occur in definite concentrations. Most bottles appear to be crown seal and are machine made. Bottles from Australian Glass Manufacturers (AGM) appear with some regularity. Three AGM base marks have been identified, one used between 1922 and 1929, a second between 1929 and 1933 and a third between 1934 and 1948.

There are brick fragments throughout the site. Oral evidence suggests that a Mr Brown made the bricks on site. The kiln for the manufacture of the bricks was destroyed in the 1960s when work was conducted on the dam.

To the east of the main mine complex are the ruins of two dry stone wall structures. The structure closest to the mine complex has a ground surface area of 8 square metres (86 sq ft) and has a slate floor with an obvious edge. Remnants of two exterior corner walls survive and are constructed by embedding slate into antbed. The extant walls are approximately 2 metres (6 ft 7 in) high. Oral evidence indicates that this building was the manager's residence, the last known manager being Anthony Linedale.

== Heritage listing ==
Ortona Mine and Battery was listed on the Queensland Heritage Register on 25 August 2000 having satisfied the following criteria.

The place is important in demonstrating the evolution or pattern of Queensland's history.

The Ortona Mine and Battery is significant demonstrating the effort employed in the early exploration and development of mineral deposits, in this case, copper. The place is the most isolated copper mine and treatment plant in the Georgetown Mining District. It contains historical landscape qualities and demonstrates a combining of natural and cultural heritage values.
