= Gilberton, Queensland (Etheridge Shire) =

Gilberton
- Town
- Interactive map of Gilberton
- Coordinates: 19.2738°S 143.6513°E
- Country: Australia
- State: Queensland
- LGA: Shire of Etheridge
- Location: 139 km (86 mi) S of Forsayth; 191 km (119 mi) S of Georgetown; 435 km (270 mi) W of Townsville; 1,738 km (1,080 mi) NNW of Brisbane

Government
  - State electorate: Traeger
  - Federal division: Kennedy

Area
  - Total: 3,995.9 km^{2} (1,542.8 sq mi)

Population
  - Total: 26 (2021 census)
  - Density: 0.00651/km^{2} (0.0169/sq mi)
- Time zone: UTC+10:00 (AEST)
- Postcode: 4871
Localities around Gilberton
Northhead	Forsayth	Lyndhurst
Bellfield	Gilberton	Lyndhurst
Woolgar	Porcupine	Lyndhurst

Gilberton is a rural locality in the Shire of Etheridge, Queensland, Australia. In the 2021 census, the locality of Gilberton had a population of 26 people.

== Geography ==
The old Gilberton township lies within a cattle station (privately owned by one family since 1869, which was established on the Ewamian Aboriginal land. The only remains of the town is the stone fortress that was built by the Martell family in 1869. The date palm on the northern side of the Gilbert River is the site of the Corbett store.

The Gilbert River flows from the south-east to the north-west of the locality and then travels northward towards its mouth at the Gulf of Carpentaria. Gilberton Station neighbors Rungullla National Park.

The terrain is mountainous with the Newcastle Range in the north-east of the locality and Gilbert Range (19.3333°S 144.0333°E) in the east of the locality. There are a number of named peaks, from north to south:

- Mount Moran (19.1316°S 143.8386°E)
- North Knob (19.2158°S 143.8780°E)
- Middle Knob (19.255°S 143.8838°E)
- Conical Hill (19.225°S 143.9130°E)
- Commissioners Hill (19.2861°S 143.6663°E)
- Hanns Table Mountain (19.2872°S 143.8233°E)
- South Knob (19.2875°S 143.8797°E)
- Black Cap (19.3080°S 143.9769°E)
- Mount Rous (19.3311°S 143.9086°E)

== History ==
The name Gilberton comes from the Gilbert River, which in turn was named by explorer Ludwig Leichhardt on 12 July 1845, after his expedition member John Gilbert who was killed near the Carpentaria coast on 28 June 1845.

== Demographics ==
In the 2016 census, the locality of Gilberton had a population of 4 people.

In the 2021 census, the locality of Gilberton had a population of 26 people.

== Heritage listings ==
Gilberton has a number of heritage-listed sites, including:

- Ortona Mine and Battery, Forsayth-Agate Creek - Ortona (Iona) Station Road
- Mount Moran Battery, New Woolgar Road
- Joseph Morris Mine

== Education ==
There are no schools in Gilberton. The nearest government primary school is Forsayth State School in neighbouring Forsayth to the north but it is a considerable distance away. There are no nearby secondary schools. Distance education or boarding schools are the alternatives.
