= Basilica of San Tommaso Apostolo, Ortona =

Minor basilica in Ortona, Abruzzo, Italy

Basilica of San Tommaso Apostolo
- Co-Cathedral Basilica of Saint Thomas the Apostle
- Basilica Concattedrale di San Tommaso Apostolo
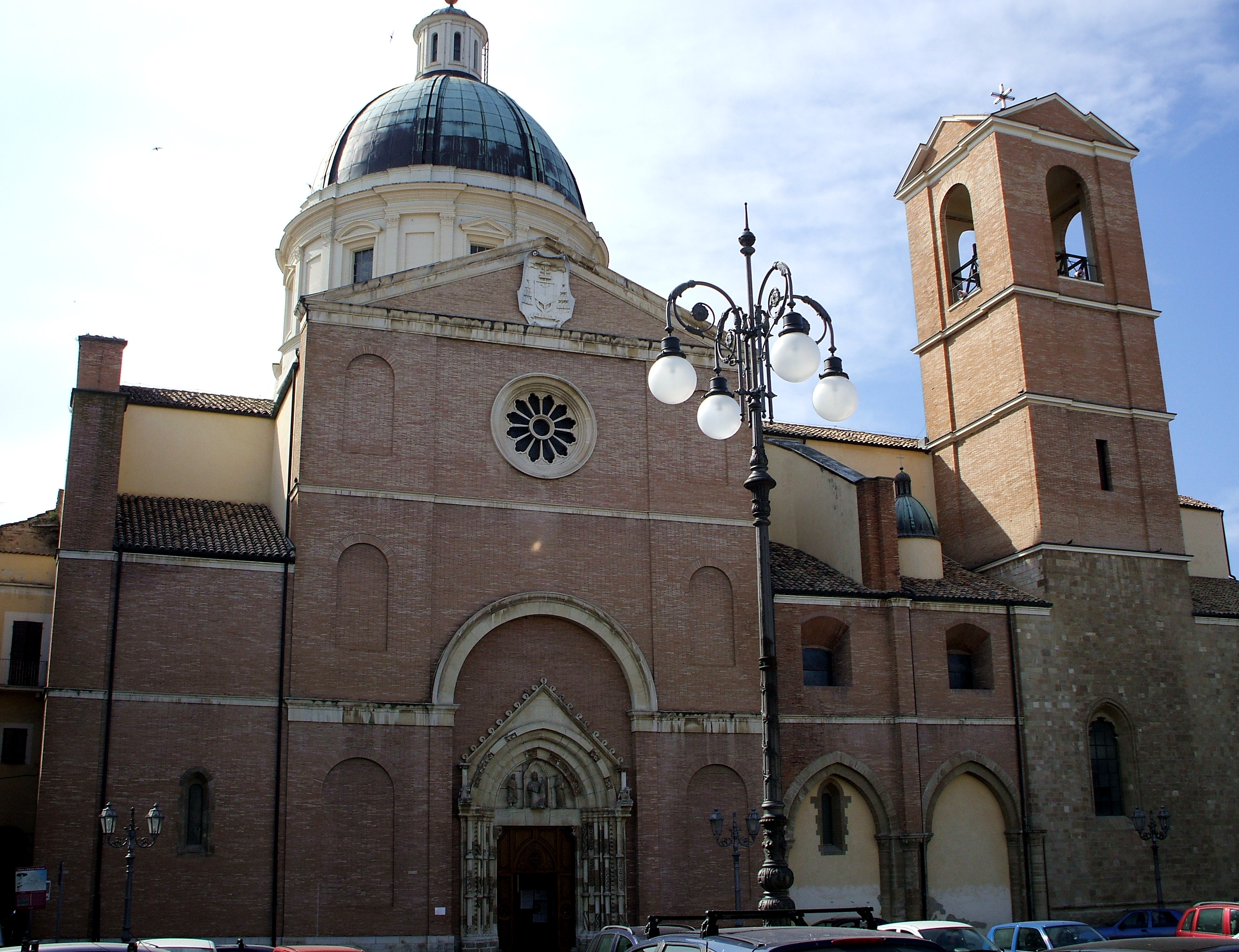
- West face

- Location within Abruzzo
- 42°21′26″N 14°24′16″E
- Location: Piazza S. Tommaso, Ortona
- Country: Italy
- Language: Italian
- Denomination: Roman Catholic
- Tradition: Roman Rite
- Website: tommasoapostolo.it

History
- Dedication: Thomas the Apostle
- Earlier dedication: Mary of the Angels (from 1057)

Architecture
- Functional status: Co-cathedral, minor basilica
- Architectural type: Baroque (with surviving Gothic portal)

Administration
- Province: Chieti-Vasto
- Archdiocese: Lanciano-Ortona
- Parish: Parrocchia S. Tommaso Apostolo – Basilica Concattedrale

The Basilica of San Tommaso Apostolo ("St. Thomas the Apostle"), also Ortona Cathedral (Italian: Basilica-Concattedrale di San Tommaso Apostolo; Duomo d'Ortona), is a Roman Catholic cathedral and minor basilica in Ortona, Abruzzo, Italy, famous for holding the relics of Saint Thomas the Apostle. It was formerly also the episcopal seat of the diocese of Ortona and is now a co-cathedral in the diocese of Lanciano-Ortona.

The Basilica was built on the site of an ancient Roman temple. Destroyed by the Normans in 1060, it was rebuilt and dedicated to Santa Maria degli Angeli in 1127. Since 1258 the Basilica has housed relics of Saint Thomas. The cathedral has suffered damage from military attacks by the Ottomans in 1566, the French in 1799 and from fighting during the Battle of Ortona in 1943.

== Sources ==
- Basilica di San Tommaso Apostolo - official website (in Italian)
