= Kidston =

Kidston may refer to:

== People ==
- Kidston (surname)

== Places ==
=== Australia ===
- Kidston, Queensland, a ghost town in Queensland, Australia
  - Kidston State Battery & Township
  - Kidston Gold Mine
  - Kidston Solar Project
  - Kidston Dam, in neighbouring Lyndhurst

=== Canada ===
- Kidston Island, an island in Baddeck, Nova Scotia, Canada

== See also ==
- Kidston Dam, a dam in Queensland, Australia
