= Ptilotus capensis =

Scientific classification
- Kingdom: Plantae
- Clade: Tracheophytes
- Clade: Angiosperms
- Clade: Eudicots
- Order: Caryophyllales
- Family: Amaranthaceae
- Genus: Ptilotus
- Species: P. capensis

Binomial name
- Ptilotus capensis (Benl) A.R.Bean

Synonyms
- Ptilotus distans subsp. capensis Benl

Species of grass-like plant

Ptilotus capensis is a species of flowering plant in the family Amaranthaceae and is endemic to Queensland. It is an erect perennial herb or shrub with linear leaves and spikes of dull green, hairy flowers.

== Description ==
Ptilotus capensis is an erect perennial herb or shrub that typically grows up to about 1 m (3 ft 3 in) high with linear leaves. The flowers are dull green, red-streaked when fresh, and densely arranged in spikes mostly 80–150 mm (3.1–5.9 in) long and 10–15 mm (0.39–0.59 in) wide. The bracts are narrowly lance-shaped, 5.2 mm (0.20 in) long and the bracteoles are 6.3 mm (0.25 in) long. The tepals are linear up to 15 mm (0.59 in) long, there are one or two fertile stamens and several staminodes, and the style is about 7.5 mm (0.30 in) long.

== Taxonomy ==
This species was first formally described in 1984 by Gerhard Benl who gave it the name Ptilotus distans subsp. capensis in the journal Austrobaileya from specimens collected on Thursday Island by Frederick Manson Bailey in 1897. In 2008, Anthony Bean raised the subspecies to species status as Ptilotus capensis in the journal Telopea.

== Distribution ==
Ptilotus capensis grows in open woodland on Torres Strait Islands and on Cape York Peninsula as far south as Kidston.

== Conservation status ==
This species of Ptilotus is listed as "not threatened" under the Queensland Government Nature Conservation Act 1992.

== See also ==
- List of Ptilotus species
