= Kagara =

Kagara may refer to:

== Places ==
- Kagara Emirate, Niger State, Nigeria
  - Kagara, Niger State, a community in the emirate
- Kagara, Sokoto, Nigeria, a village in Sokoto State
- Kagera Region, Tanzania
- Kagera River, a river that originates in Burundi and flows into Lake Victoria
- Kagara sima, an island in Saga Prefecture, Japan

== Other uses ==
- Muhammadu Bello Kagara (1890–1971), Nigerian educator and writer
- Kagara Ltd, a former Australian mining company

== See also ==
- ǂKá̦gára, a character in San mythology
- 469705 ǂKá̦gára, a Trans-Neptunian object named after ǂKá̦gára
