= Einasleigh, Queensland =

Einasleigh
- Town
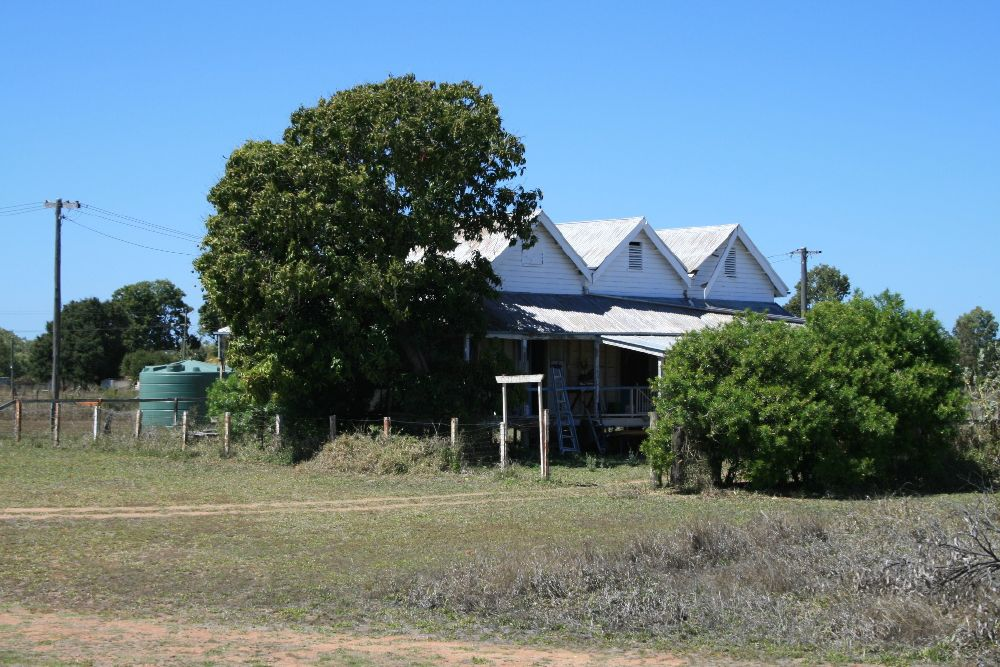
- Station master's residence, 2008

- Interactive map of Einasleigh
- Coordinates: 18.5133°S 144.0936°E
- Country: Australia
- State: Queensland
- LGA: Shire of Etheridge
- Location: 167 km (104 mi) SE of Georgetown; 362 km (225 mi) SW of Cairns; 471 km (293 mi) NW of Townsville; 1,645 km (1,022 mi) NW of Brisbane

Government
  - State electorate: Traeger
  - Federal division: Kennedy

Area
  - Total: 4,060.5 km^{2} (1,567.8 sq mi)

Population
  - Total: 87 (2021 census)
  - Density: 0.02143/km^{2} (0.0555/sq mi)
- Time zone: UTC+10:00 (AEST)
- Postcode: 4871
Localities around Einasleigh
Georgetown	Talaroo	Mount Surprise
Forsayth	Einasleigh	Conjuboy
Forsayth	Lyndhurst	Lyndhurst

Einasleigh is a rural town and locality in the Shire of Etheridge, Queensland, Australia. In the 2021 census, the locality of Einasleigh had a population of 87 people.

== Geography ==
The town is in the north of the locality at the confluence of Einasleigh River with the Copperfield River. The Einasleigh River has a catchment area of 24,366 square kilometres (9,408 sq mi). Following its confluence with the Gilbert River, they spill into a vast estuarine delta approximately 100 kilometres (62 mi) wide that largely consists of tidal flats and mangrove swamps across the Gulf Country. The Einasleigh River descends 730 metres (2,400 ft) over its 618-kilometre (384 mi) course.

Kidston is a ghost town within the south of the locality (18.8736°S 144.1680°E).

The Tablelands railway line enters the locality from the north-east (Mount Surprise) and exits to the west (Forsayth). The line passes through the town of Einasleigh which is served by the Einasleigh railway station in Railway Street (18.5140°S 144.0917°E).

=== Mountains ===
Einasleigh has numerous mountains (from north to south):

- Beril Peak (18.3406°S 144.0189°E) 670 metres (2,200 ft)
- Blackman Peak (18.3536°S 144.0223°E) 650 metres (2,130 ft)
- Fraser Peak (18.3557°S 144.0305°E) 670 metres (2,200 ft)
- The Lighthouse (18.3808°S 144.1520°E) 519 metres (1,703 ft)
- The Canyon (18.3813°S 144.0319°E) 706 metres (2,316 ft)
- Mount Alder (18.4228°S 144.1004°E) 590 metres (1,940 ft)
- Stockmans Hill (18.4950°S 144.0522°E) 570 metres (1,870 ft)
- Mount Juliet (18.5005°S 144.1748°E) 630 metres (2,070 ft)
- Mount Ossa (18.5348°S 144.0229°E) 550 metres (1,800 ft)
- Mount Harry (18.5534°S 144.1321°E) 498 metres (1,634 ft)
- Mount Mambury (18.5577°S 144.0245°E) 670 metres (2,200 ft)
- Mount Blacktop (18.5793°S 144.3614°E) 618 metres (2,028 ft)
- Mount Tabletop (18.6078°S 144.3192°E) 630 metres (2,070 ft)
- Mount Misery (18.6092°S 143.9940°E) 610 metres (2,000 ft)
- Mount Borium (18.6843°S 144.0287°E) 710 metres (2,330 ft)
- The Twins (18.7067°S 144.0722°E) 547 metres (1,795 ft)
- Greys Hill (18.7169°S 144.4118°E) 610 metres (2,000 ft)
- Iib Pinnacles (18.8148°S 144.2394°E) 650 metres (2,130 ft)
- Mount Jordan (18.8206°S 144.2773°E) 615 metres (2,018 ft)
- Ironstone Knobs (18.8960°S 144.2591°E) 656 metres (2,152 ft)
- Paddys Knob (18.9026°S 144.1434°E) 608 metres (1,995 ft)

== History ==
The traditional owners Einasleigh and the surrounding area are the Ewamin (or Agwamin) people.

The name of Einasleigh came from the river, which was named by a surveyor and pastoralists in August 1864.

A police station was established in 1900 but closed in 1903. Questions were raised in 1906 as to why Einasleigh, with two hotels, two stores, and "hundreds of travelling public" annually had no police protection. A station was opened again. The police station in Baroota Street was closed in August 2005. It was in Baroota Street (18.51206°S 144.09327°E). As at September 2024, the police station building is still extant.

Einasleigh Provisional School opened on 29 October 1901. It closed in 1905, but reopened in 1906. On 1 January 1909, it became Einasleigh State School. It closed in 1955. It was at 5–7 First Street (18.5101°S 144.0932°E).

In September 1908, housekeeper Nellie Margaret Duffy was murdered at the Carpentaria Downs pastoral station, 30 kilometres (19 mi) south-east of Einasleigh. There were two alleged offenders; one was later discharged and, despite confessions, the other was found not guilty.

Einasleigh Post Office opened by May 1909 (a receiving office had been open from 1900) and closed in 1993.

In 1930, the local butcher and another man were charged with the murder of two Chinese market gardeners, Jimmy Hop and Wing Chung. The defendants were later found not guilty as the evidence was only circumstantial.

In January 2026, it was reported that the town flooded and residents had to be evacuated due to excessive rainfall in the Copperfield River catchment, resulting in the Kidston Dam to burst its banks.

== Demographics ==
In the 2006 census, the locality of Einasleigh had a population of 202 people.

In the 2016 census, the locality of Einasleigh had a population of 92 people.

In the 2021 census, the locality of Einasleigh had a population of 87 people.

== Heritage listings ==
Einasleigh has a number of heritage-listed sites, including:

- Einasleigh Copper Mine and Smelter, Daintree Road
- Einasleigh Hotel, Daintree Street
- Einasleigh railway station and Station Master's Residence on the Etheridge railway line (now Tablelands railway line)
- Kidston State Battery & Township, Kidston

== Economy ==
The Kidston Gold Mine, located south-west of the former town of Kidston (18.8894°S 144.1425°E), was a major employer in the area. Following close of the mine in 2001, a clean energy hub was established. The hub comprises a 50-megawatt (67,000 hp) solar farm (KS1), completed in 2017; and a 250-megawatt (340,000 hp) pumped storage hydroelectric power station (K2-Hydro), commissioned in 2025. A 270-megawatt (360,000 hp) hybrid wind farm (K3-Hybrid) with battery storage is also planned as part of the hub, expected to be commissioned from 2028. The hub is operated by Genex Power. The Kidston Solar Project (KS1) has highest solar radiation zone in Australia, with 540,000 solar panels operating on a single-axis tracking system.

== Education ==
There are no schools in Einasleigh. The nearest government primary schools are Forsayth State School in neighbouring Forsayth to the west, Georgetown State School in neighbouring Georgetown to the north-west, and Mount Surprise State School in neighbouring Mount Surprise to the north-east. However, for students living in the south and east of the locality, these schools will be too distant for a daily commute. Also, there are no secondary schools nearby to Einasleigh. The alternatives are distance education and boarding school.
