= Lyndhurst pastoral station =

The Lyndhurst pastoral station in Lyndhurst, North Queensland was originally referred to as “the Lyndhurst run” and often referred to as Lyndhurst Station. It was established in approximately 1863 by Mr Barnes and John Fulford. The property bred prize-winning Hereford cattle and has an important place in Australia's early history. The Station still operates as a cattle station today under the management of the Welcome Downs Cattle Co.

== Location ==
Originally the station was referred to as located in Basalt country. Later the location was considered to be a part of Georgetown and later known (officially in the year 2000) as Lyndhurst. It is also sometimes known to be located in the nearby suburb of Einasleigh.

The station is located close to the airstrip at Lyndhurst. The name of the town presumably got its name from the Lyndhurst pastoral station.

Its large size (in 1895 was 1,000 square miles) makes it significant to the local area geographically.

The official address of the operators of the Lyndhurst Station, the “Welcome Downs Cattle Co.” is “Lyndhurst Station, 4871 Einasleigh”.

== History ==
The pastoral station is associated with the early history of Australia and the Queensland area. The export of cattle and meat were primary sources of income and closely associated with over economic growth of Australia.

In 1895 the station had around 35,000 cattle and also drafted horses.

Fats and other meat by-products discarded were passed on to the Alligator Creek meatworks or the Ross River Meatworks for further processing and sale.

White ants were a problem at the station, destroying the original fence work made out of iron bark, which was replaced by stonework.

In 1918, the Government purchased the station. One of the conditions of purchase is that the vendor needed to invest part of the sale proceeds in government debentures for a period of time.

Richard Morton Machan (who was known for his later contributions and for being the namesake of the suburb of Machans Beach) worked at the station, which at the time was considered to be part of Georgetown.

Trading as the “Welcome Downs Cattle Co.” (Keough Family Trust), it currently operates on Lyndhurst Station, Einsasleigh Qld.
