= Einasleigh Copper Mine and Smelter =

- Location within Queensland Location within Australia
- 18.5066°S 144.0979°E
- Location: Daintree Road, Einasleigh, Shire of Etheridge, Queensland, Australia

History
- Design period: 1840s–1860s (mid-19th century)
- Built: 1867–1922

Queensland Heritage Register
- Official name: Einasleigh Copper Mine and Smelter, Lynd Copper Mine, New Einasleigh Copper Mine
- Type: state heritage (archaeological, built)
- Designated: 11 December 2006
- Reference no.: 602586
- Significant period: 1860s–1920s (fabric, historical)
- Significant components: yards – livestock, magazine / explosives store, shaft, machinery/plant/equipment – mining/mineral processing, slab/s – concrete, footings, blazed tree/dig tree/marker tree

Einasleigh Copper Mine and Smelter is a heritage-listed mine at Daintree Road, Einasleigh, Shire of Etheridge, Queensland, Australia. It was built from 1867 to 1922. It is also known as Lynd Copper Mine and New Einasleigh Copper Mine. It was added to the Queensland Heritage Register on 11 December 2006.

== History ==
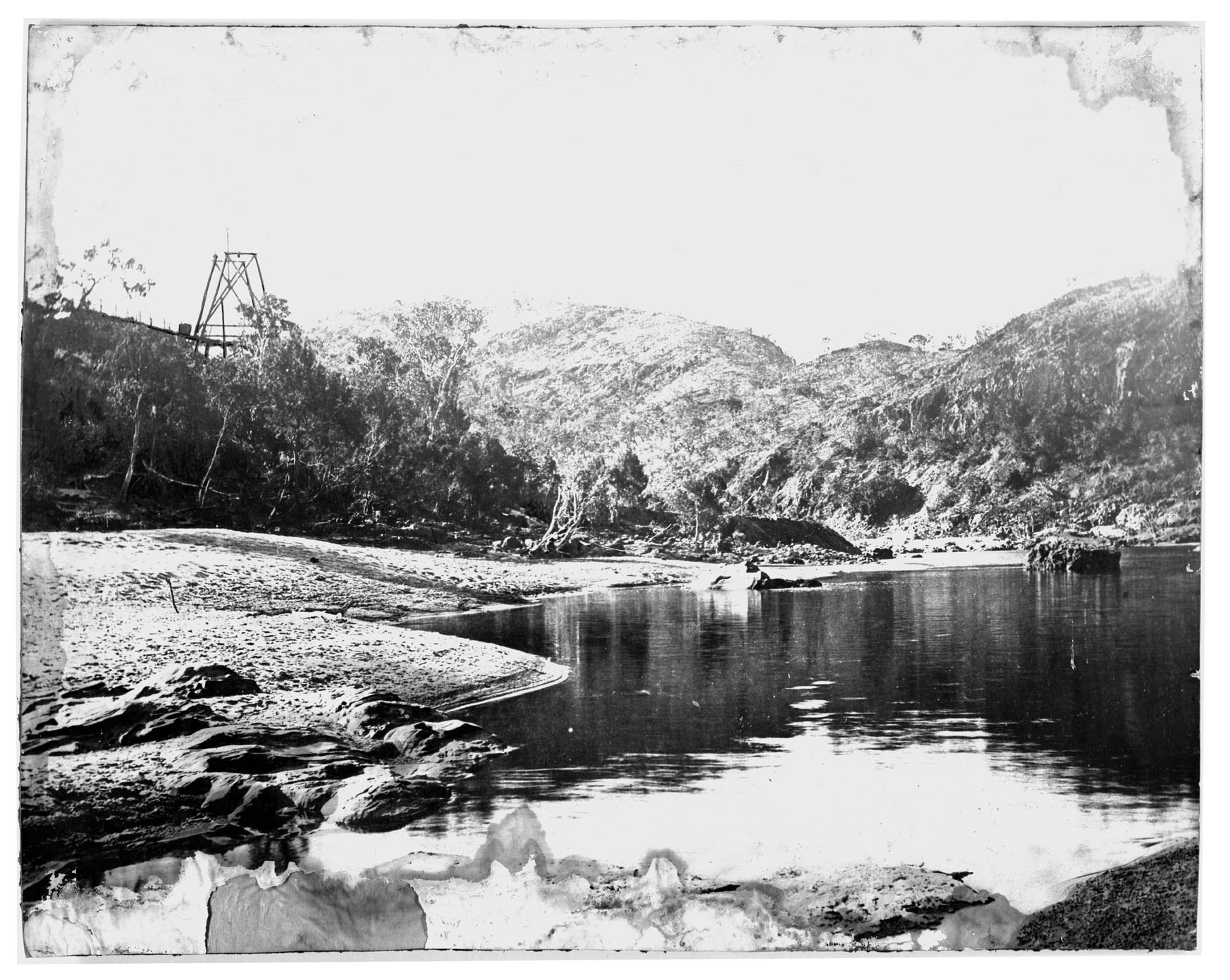
Einasleigh copper mine, c 1896 - 1925

The Einasleigh Mine and Smelter is located in Etheridge Shire, some 360 kilometres (220 mi) from Cairns. The site is an area of around 4 hectares (9.9 acres), situated 1 kilometre (0.62 mi) north of Einasleigh Township, on the west bank of the Copperfield River at its junction with the Einasleigh River. It is located about 500 metres (1,600 ft) north of the Copperfield Gorge.

Australia's copper industry was in its infancy when Richard Daintree discovered the copper deposit near the basalt wall at the head of the Copperfield River watershed in 1867. He secured a freehold title over 120 acres (49 ha). The lode was stripped by open-cut where it protruded from the river bank and 31-long-ton (31 t) picked ore was sent to smelters at Cockle Creek for a return of 22% copper with 3 ounces (85 g) of silver and 12 pennyweights (0.66 oz; 19 g) of gold per 1 long ton (1.0 t).

Although located adjacent to the confluence of the Copperfield and the Einasleigh Rivers this mine was initially known as the Lynd Copper Mine as Daintree believed that the adjacent river was the Lynd River.

The Lynd Mine was a small operation. According to one account a shaft was sunk in 1867 and "a drive at the 30-ft level showed the lode to be 23 feet in width and to consist of spongy metallic copper." Daintree and his partner William Hann worked the mine in a "desultory fashion" for a few years but by 1898 the site was reported as deserted by surveyor Robert Logan Jack.

By 1900 the mine was back in production when William Woodhead from Broken Hill acquired freehold title and floated it publicly. Now known as Einasleigh Freehold Copper Mines Ltd, development of the mine began with a new shaft sunk to 61 metres (200 ft). A new headframe was erected, along with a 24-metre (79 ft) boiler stack and gantry. Machinery including winding gear and a water-jacket blast furnace at a cost of £12,517 was brought from Mareeba. The smelter's furnace was blown-in in 1901 but the operation was soon closed down because of the siliceous nature of the ore, transportation costs and the high cost of fuel. Prior to the opening of the Chillagoe rail line in 1910, fuel for the smelters was brought in by camel trains.

The mine reopened in 1906 as the New Einasleigh Copper Mine, a subsidiary of the Chillagoe Company. Number 3 level was developed in 1908 and 50 men were employed on the mine site. Employee numbers doubled in 1909 to 105 men and productivity leapt to an impressive 10,913 long tons (11,088 t) of ore.

The isolation of the mine again made the operation marginal. All supplies had to come either 462 kilometres (287 mi) overland from Townsville or via Cairns for 192 kilometres (119 mi) along the Chillagoe line to Almaden, and then carted by bullock team another 190 kilometres (120 mi) to the mine. Coke, which was vital for smelting cost from £12 to £14 to land at the mine and limestone had to be carted for over 48 kilometres (30 mi). After treating 860 long tons (870 t) of ore, smelting was abandoned even though 191 long tons (194 t) of copper matte had been produced.

The mines on the Chillagoe field had proved inadequate even to keep the Chillgoe smelter supplied, let alone make a profit, and it became increasingly urgent that the Chillagoe Company obtain ore supplies elsewhere. In 1907 construction began on a railway to the Etheridge field, principally to bring ore from the Einasleigh mine and tap known copper deposits around Charleston (later Forsayth). Once the railway was opened in 1910 Einasleigh ore could be railed directly to Chillagoe.

The opening of the new Etheridge railway to Forsayth in 1910 allowed for the daily transportation of ore to Chillagoe as the route passed by the Einasleigh Mine. This boosted development of the site: new offices and houses were built. The main shaft was extended to 119 metres (390 ft) and worked from 4 levels by 87 men, while a further 30 men were employed above ground. A change-house with a concrete floor was erected. Machinery was upgraded, including a new Babcock and Wilcox boiler, and construction of a concentrating plant large enough to deal with the expected 150 long tons (150 t) of ore a day, was started.

By 1911 ore production was not meeting expectations and the Chillagoe Company bought out the mine from its subsidiary and installed an Elmore flotation unit. Until the invention of the flotation process, the extraction of metal depended upon being able to handpick the material in order to be economical.

The flotation process depends on the properties of minerals surfaces and the manner in which they differ in the degree by which their surfaces can be wetted. It takes best advantage of such differences by suitable choice of the solution. Ore is first ground to a powder, which is introduced to a series of tanks (known as flotation cells) holding a solution containing oils. This solution is constantly agitated and air is pumped through. In the resulting froth the particles of copper minerals adhere to the raft of air bubbles on the surface, while the majority of worthless rock (gangue) sinks. The material is skimmed from the surface froth.

Lionel Clive Ball, assistant government geologist, deemed the installation of the floatation unit a "complete failure". Mine development continued in an unsystematic manner and the quality of the ore produced declined. Untreated ore was sent direct to the Company's smelter, 120 miles (190 km) away, and in 1911 the Company had to reduce railway freight on ore by 50% to keep the mine working. This seemingly uneconomical and inefficient practice was, according to Ball, due to the Mine's small reserves and the great expense of erecting smelters at Einasleigh. The Chillagoe Company's motives were largely due to its need for the Etheridge's ore and railway revenue, and to further open up the Etheridge field. Whatever the case, by 1913 the Einasleigh Mine was the main supplier of copper ore to the Chillagoe Smelters.

Development of the mine continued to progress throughout 1913 in most levels of the mine and the mineshaft was being extended. Below ground, No. 1 level (120 feet (37 m)) extended beneath the river and was stulled to reduce the risk of ingress from the river. No. 2 level (170 feet (52 m)) had various drives linked to the south shaft and included the "Big Stope" (120 feet (37 m) long and up to 40 feet (12 m) wide) below this level with copper contents as high as 10%. No. 3 level (269.5 feet (82.1 m)) had five almost continuous stopes in one formation. The ore-bodies at No. 4 level were below payable limit and at No. 5 level (482 feet (147 m)) the "Big ore-body" was 300 feet (91 m) distant from the shaft. No. 6 level (582 feet (177 m)) was under development.

The Chillagoe Smelters closed in February 1914 along with the Einasleigh Mine.

In 1919 the Queensland Government took over the Chillagoe Smelter and reopened the Einasleigh Mine under the terms of the Chillagoe and Etheridge Railways Purchase Act 1918, at a cost of £100,000. By December it was at full output, providing three-quarters of the copper ore treated at the smelters thereby keeping the Chillagoe Smelters going. By 1920 the mine employed 100 men and was producing 450 - 500 long tons (510 t) of copper ore per week. However, the drop in metal prices in 1920 from £120 to £72 per 1 long ton (1.0 t), and the drain on the mine's reserves, led to the mine being closed in 1922.

At this time the whole of the Chillagoe Field, the Chillagoe Smelter and mining operations generally in State-owned enterprises were losing considerable amounts of money. The Smelter was closed in 1927 due to inadequate ore supplies, but was reopened in 1929 as a means of relieving unemployment. Mining on the Etheridge as a whole generally declined after this time despite the reopening of the Chillagoe Smelter. While other mines on the Etheridge were rejuvenated periodically after this time, no attempts to mine the Einasleigh occurred until the early 1970s. This was due to the heavy depletion of its reserves in the 1920s by the Chillagoe Smelters.

In the early 1970s Combined Mining and Exploration N.L conducted operations at the Einasleigh Mine to reinitiate earlier mining works. By the end of 1970 the Mine had produced 134,257 long tons (136,411 t) of ore returning 8,107 long tons (8,237 t) of copper (overall grade 6.04%), 131,284 ounces (3,721,800 g) of silver (0.98 ounces (28 g) per 1 long ton (1.0 t)), and 22,288 ounces (631,900 g) of gold (0.34 pennyweights (0.019 oz; 0.53 g) per 1 long ton (1.0 t)). Maximum staffing during this period was 16 employees, and a manager, W.J. Collins.

Development of the mine by Combined Mining and Exploration was undertaken over a 13-month period from October 1970 to November 1971, including "mine rehabilitation and exploration" and activities which were regarded as rectifying the site. Due to more stringent occupational health and safety measures much of the site had to be upgraded to comply with safety standards. Where suitable foundations were already present from previous operations, structures were built over the top, thus reusing existing infrastructure.

During the early part of 1971 activities included the installation of bearers for an air winch, installation of 3,000 feet (910 m) of polythene plastic water liner to work as a reticulation system for the camp, and a concrete floor for the power house being poured to the south of the main shaft and an area cleared for a garage/workshop. The workshop/storeroom area was completed and an ablution block was adapted from concrete engine beds remaining from previous operations. Mullock, soil and oxidised material were spread over much of the site during this time to provide a safer working surface. Mullock was also spread out between the main shaft and river, covering the Daintree shaft mouth.

In February 1971 the steel tripod was put over the main shaft, and in March a tramway was installed between the main shaft and the river bank. A flat-top trolley was acquired to run on the railway.

In June 1971, a new steel headframe was built over the shaft collar with a cross head made up to run in the main shaft. It is not known what the cross head was supporting. The air winch was repositioned and a winch house almost directly west of the main shaft was made. Extra timber and lagging was placed at the entrance of the mine shaft due to fears of falling rocks. Safety concerns also led to replacement of the old pulley-sheave with a new gin-wheel. Ladder ways and timbering in the shafts were substantially upgraded as most had split due to water logging. Most of the metal infrastructure such as pipe work and bolts had corroded due to their long period of saturation, and were replaced.

From March to November 1971, the mine was continuously dewatered in stages, ultimately down to 700 feet (210 m), No. 6 level. Water samples taken from 300 feet (91 m) showed very low copper content, and when "two diamond- drill holes directed to intersect the main ore body at approximately 700 ft failed to intersect ore," operations at the mine ceased.

In 2006 an area including the site of the former Einasleigh Mine was leased by Copper Strike Ltd to develop a new mine. In December 2011, Copper Strike sold its Einasleigh Project to Kagara Limited for AU$16million and Kagara's 22.6 million shares in Copper Strike. Kagara sold the Einasleigh Project to Snow Peak Mining in January 2013. Snow Peak Mining owns a major stake in Consolidated Tin Mines Limited, which is undertaking exploratory activity in Einasleigh in 2016.

== Description ==
The Einasleigh Copper Mine site is a mix of very early workings and those of the exploration crews in the 1970s and the past year or so. Concrete engine mounts, the mill, a slag "floor", ore dumps, steel framed sheds and evidence of the change rooms and toilets from the 1970s are intersected by drill pads from exploration in 2005.

In the grass beyond the main mine site are traces of the 1970s work camp: a concrete slab floor and a power pole. They are adjacent to an elaborate concrete fountain derived from an earlier occupation period.

Sitting out on the flats are the remains of a stonewalled building, which retained its corrugated iron roof into the 1960s. It is presumed to have been an explosives store.

The mine was serviced by the rail link from Almaden and there is limited evidence of the line between Einasleigh railway station and the mine itself. This is due to a combination of events: removal of the rail track, the construction of an airstrip at some stage west of the mine, frequent grass fires and souveniring of the sleepers. However, a trail of dog spikes once used to secure the line is discernible along part of the east west access that presently passes the isolated multitubular boiler.

Within Copperfield Gorge, the foundations of a water pump, a boiler mounting and water pipe securing saddles have been recorded.

=== Main Shaft ===
The main shaft was originally developed as a three-compartment shaft: one manway and two for skips. Although the original size is not stated they were commonly about 6 by 18 feet (1.8 by 5.5 m). Due to collapses during the period between World War I and 1970 the actual opening is now substantially larger. There is a section of concrete collar on the east side of the shaft extending down about 2.5 metres (8 ft 2 in). The shaft is blocked about 9 metres (30 ft) below ground level.

Parts of the steel headframe erected in 1971 remain: a rudimentary structure above the shaft with one leg proud of the ground and another loosely positioned. A post and wire fence has been erected around the shaft for safety.

Traces of some of the original headframe's footings are evident. Two sheave wheels, 1,120-millimetre (44 in) diameter with a 120-millimetre (4.7 in) diameter and a 120-millimetre-deep (4.7 in) rim lie on a nearby rubble heap. Both have sections of rim missing and some buckled spokes.

=== Winding Engine ===
The original winding house is identifiable by its foundations. It would seem probable that the footprint of the building could be identified if surface deposits were carefully cleaned back. The chimney at 7951211N 193762E (by GPS) is probably part of that structure. Photographs from around 1910 show that the foundations supported a steel chimney. The chimney is no longer extant.

=== Primary Crusher ===
The concrete mounts for the crusher are immediately north of the main shaft.

=== Blacksmith shop and tanks ===
The original blacksmith's workshop floor was a 7-by-7-metre (23 ft × 23 ft) slab. It appears to have been partially capped with additional concrete at some later stage, or stages, possibly when modified as a workshop in the 1970s. This structure is steel framed and sheeted with corrugated iron. It is currently used for storing hay.

=== Stone magazine ===
A drystone building is located just below the cliff top SSW of the former blacksmith shop. It is assumed to have been an explosives magazine. The building stands around a metre high. Several rocks lie adjacent and downhill suggesting a significantly higher building initially. The wall thickness ranges from 600 to 750 millimetres (24 to 30 in) thick with an internal space of about 2 by 2.9 metres (6 ft 7 in × 9 ft 6 in). This was accessed via a doorway 850 millimetres (33 in) wide. The floor appears to have been built out from the cliff and levelled using a mix of basalt boulders (the whole site is strewn with large quantities) and soil. Neither evidence of an access to the doorway nor of the roofing remains.

=== Mill ===
The former mill is located north of the main shaft, beyond the crusher, and is now represented by a series of engine mounting blocks and a concrete floor. A discarded 4 x 4 truck tray has been dumped on part of the floor.

The Mill chimney base, a ring of clay bricks at ground level, has a base diameter of 3,600 millimetres (140 in).

Part of a disintegrating corrugated iron shed, possibly from the 1970s, stands on the southern end of the mill foundations. Debris is scattered in the adjacent area.

=== Smelter ===
The vicinity of the smelter has been severely impacted on by drilling rigs and the 1970s mining activities. Some smelter equipment and parts of the foundation remain intact and, significant among them, are parts of a poured slag floor. It extends NE to the edge of the slag dump itself. Carefully pouring the slag, so that it retained a smooth top, ensured that the hot slag could be moved rapidly across the dump as required. Drums related to the process are scattered in adjacent areas.

=== Assay Lab ===
The former assay laboratory stood southwest of the main shaft. A stone chimney and associated brickwork remain amidst a scatter of crucibles and other material.

=== South Shaft ===
The south shaft is situated at the edge of the riverbank overlooking the Copperfield River. The shaft appears to have collapsed at about 25 metres (82 ft) down. The timber pigsty collar is intact but skewed toward the river. It measures about 1,200 by 2,400 millimetres (47 in × 94 in) suggesting it was a two- compartment shaft. Timbers were all about 400-millimetre (16 in) diameter. Corrugated iron sheets were attached to the external wall of the pigsty to retain soil and rock. Machined wire nails were used to secure many of the timbers suggesting that it probably dates from the early - mid 20th century.

There appears to be a rough track along the cliff top developed by clearing basalt boulders that scatter the surface of most of the site. This may have been a pedestrian access or a tramway for hauling to the mill.

=== North Shaft ===
A small shaft is located 25 metres (82 ft) north of the main shaft. Its purpose is unclear but may have served as a ventilation and supply shaft. It is fenced and appears to have collapsed internally.

=== Fountain and caravan site ===
The fountain was presumably built in the early 20th century but is adjacent to a caravan parking area probably used in the 1970s. A concrete slab and a nearby power pole and metre box identify the caravan pad. There is a short length of steel picket fencing to the south of the fountain.

The fountain is 1,100 millimetres (43 in) high x 1,600 millimetres (63 in) diameter. It comprises a base section of concreted basalt rocks concreted in as a 720-millimetre-high (28 in) dished receptacle from which the central fountain-stem 580 millimetres (23 in) rises. There are pipes present that suggest it was a low-pressure system relying on water cascading from the upper to lower bowl.

Limited stonework is visible in the area suggesting that there were garden beds around the water feature.

The power line appears to have run to this site from a route possibly passing the old Assay Lab. There is one power post still standing.

=== Stone building ===
A large stone building is situated 350 metres (1,150 ft) NNW of the main shaft. While its function is unclear it is generally accepted that this windowless structure was probably the main explosives magazine. The building apparently retained a corrugated iron roof until the 1960s.

The floor area is 3.7 by 4 metres (12 ft × 13 ft) and has a 1-metre-wide (3.3 ft) doorway on the SW wall. One section of the NW wall has collapsed to 1.4 metres (4 ft 7 in) above floor level (plus 410 millimetres (16 in) above ground level) but for the most part it varies between 2 and 2.1 metres (6 ft 7 in and 6 ft 11 in) high. The walls are about 500 millimetres (20 in) thick. The upper course is recessed to hold the roof frame.

=== Multitubular boiler ===
A solitary multitubular boiler with no distinguishing marks, lies in bushes about 150 metres (490 ft) from the main shaft. The key measurements are: diameter 1.7 metres (5 ft 7 in); length 4.06 metres (13.3 ft); central valve 850 millimetres (33 in) high by 750 millimetres (30 in); and 41 tubes in 7 rows (11 x 1, 4 x 2, 3 x 2, 3 x 2, 2 x 2, 2 x 2, and 1 x 2).

Its original location may have been at the smelter or mill although its size suggests it would have only been a medium capacity unit.

=== Survey mark and cattle yard ===
Within about 4 metres (13 ft) of the northwest corner peg for Lot 2 and the southwest corner of Lot 1 and within Lot 1, is an old survey blaze reading vertically 'MHL 1893 (?) 420, on a large tree. The scar has substantially healed suggesting it relates to early 20th century mining activity.

The tree is within a small set of post and rail yards with a small loading ramp facing east. These yards appear to have been constructed around 1920 to 1940.

There is a scatter of domestic refuse in an area to the south and within Lot 2. The scatter appears to contain a mix of material from the early 1970s and earlier with at least one bottle appearing to date from the 1920s.

=== Railway line ===
A branch line from the Einasleigh Railway Station to the mine site was in existence in the late 1970s. After cutting across the plain west of the town it runs directly to the mine roughly parallel and south of the boundary of Lots 1 and 2. It then curves slightly, passing south of a bulldozed mound (c. 1970) and terminates at the extant buffer stops just to the north of the north shaft.

Within the rubble mound there are still several posts in situ that probably relate to the railway bin ore bin site. Between there and the buffers are traces of railway sleepers and dog spikes. The latter are found at intervals along the route outlined above. Currently it is a vehicle track that leads towards the fountain. Its actual route is less identifiable as one leaves the mine site.

=== Pump station, Copperfield Gorge ===
A pump mount and former boiler mountings within and to the west of the Copperfield Gorge. Several concrete pipe, hold-down footings exist at various locations on the gorge bank. They were probably supplying water to the mill and railway station. The steam water tower was sited near the Einasleigh station but there is no indication of the water source.

The boiler mounting site is located at 7950826N 193503E, being about 470 metres (1,540 ft) from the main shaft on a 29? MN bearing.

=== Eastern shaft ===
A small shaft, about 2 metres (6 ft 7 in) square, was identified on the eastern side of Copperfield Gorge. While there is no reference to it in the historical material, it was extant before the 1970s mining activity in the area. It is partially fenced with pickets and barbed wire. There is a length of bush timber lying over the top. The shaft has water at about 8 metres (26 ft) and there is solid material at around 12 metres (39 ft).

== Heritage listing ==
Einasleigh Copper Mine and Smelter was listed on the Queensland Heritage Register on 11 December 2006 having satisfied the following criteria.

The place is important in demonstrating the evolution or pattern of Queensland's history.

The Einasleigh Mine and Smelter is significant in Queensland history as the first base metal mine in Queensland and the first mine in the rich mining province of North Queensland. It was the only copper smelter on the Etheridge mining field and it became one of only three base metal mines owned by the State during the period of State enterprises. It was essential to the operation of the Chillagoe Smelters under the ownership of the State and the Chillagoe Company, and the Etheridge Railway was built primarily to link it with the Chillagoe Smelters.

The place has potential to yield information that will contribute to an understanding of Queensland's history.

Although the surface elements have been adversely impacted upon during the late 20th century it is expected they are still of sufficient standard to be able to yield information that will contribute to an increased understanding of early mining and smelting history. It is highly likely that sub-surface workings could provide some indications of any special techniques adopted when working beneath two large rivers.

The place is important in demonstrating the principal characteristics of a particular class of cultural places.

The Einasleigh Mine, apart from being one of the earliest copper mines in Queensland, can still demonstrate the industrial processes associated with, in particular, copper extraction in a remote location. Although most buildings and plant have been removed or renovated, the site still explains the copper extraction process. The slag dump, blast furnace mount and associated artefacts are significant, while the stone magazine and one room stone hut are noteworthy.

The place has a strong or special association with a particular community or cultural group for social, cultural or spiritual reasons.

The mine is the reason Einasleigh township came into being and is important to that community.

The place has a special association with the life or work of a particular person, group or organisation of importance in Queensland's history.

The early association with Richard Daintree is particularly significant as he is regarded as an important administrator, explorer and photographer in Queensland. It is also important for its association with the Chillagoe Company, as the railway to Einasleigh was one of the solutions to the shortage of ore on the Chillagoe field.
