= Genex Power =

Australian energy infrastructure company

- ISIN: AU000000GNX5
- Industry: electricity generation
- Headquarters: Sydney, Australia
- Revenue: 10,390,000 Australian dollar (2020)
- Owner: J-Power (2024–present)
- Website: www.genexpower.com.au

Genex Power is an Australian electricity generation company.

The firm owns the Kidston Solar Project which has been generating up to 50 MW of electricity since 2017, as well as the Jemalong Solar Project. It is developing the associated Kidston Pumped Hydro storage using the abandoned Kidston Gold Mine; and a grid battery and wind farm is being considered as part of a clean energy hub.

Genex Power also operates the Bouldercombe 50MW/100MWh battery, located near Rockhampton. The company is also proposing to expand the solar farm and add a wind farm in the same area, as well as a solar farm and battery at Bulli Creek, Queensland.

In 2024, it was announced that the Japanese J-Power had completed the purchase of the Australian company in a deal valued at $228 million.

== See also ==
- List of renewable energy companies by country
