= Einasleigh River Bridge =

- Coordinates: 18°11′08″S 144°00′30″E
- Carries: Motor vehicles
- Crosses: Einasleigh River
- Locale: Far North Queensland, Australia
- Preceded by: Low set bridge

Characteristics
- Design: Viaduct
- Material: Prestressed concrete
- Total length: 416 metres (1,365 ft)
- Width: 9 metres (30 ft)
- Longest span: 12.6 metres (41 ft)
- No. of spans: 33
- Clearance below: 8.5 metres (28 ft)

History
- Construction start: June 2010
- Construction end: 20 January 2011

Location
- Interactive map of Einasleigh River Bridge

The Einasleigh River Bridge is a road bridge over the Einasleigh River on the Gulf Developmental Road, in the Far North Queensland, Australia, located 53 kilometres (33 mi) east of Georgetown and 36 kilometres (22 mi) west of Mount Surprise. The bridge is part of the only sealed (asphalt) road linking Cairns and Normanton in the Gulf Savannah region.

The new high set bridge was constructed to flood-proof the Gulf Country. It replaced an existing low level bridge which was designed for inundation. The old bridge was flooded in every wet season. In 2009 it was under water for 40 days after the biggest flood on record. During flooding of the old Einasleigh River Bridge, most communities across the Gulf Shires were inaccessible by road and the emergency supplies had to be provided by helicopter.

The bridge was built by the Etheridge Shire Council and was funded through the Australian Government's Regional and Local Community Infrastructure Program. It was opened on 20 January 2011 by Simon Crean, the Minister for Regional Australia, Regional Development and Local Government.
