= Kidston Gold Mine =

Gold mine in Queensland, Australia

- Location within Queensland
- Location: Kidston, Einasleigh, Queensland, Australia; 18°52′36″S 144°8′17″E
- Products: Gold
- Discovered: 1907
- Opened: 1907
- Active: 1907–1947, 1985–2001
- Closed: 2001

Kidston Gold Mine is a former open cut gold mine in northern Queensland, Australia.

Gold was first discovered around 1907 at what was initially known as Oak's Rush and renamed to Kidston a few months later as a gold rush started. The gold was initially alluvial gold found in gullies leading to the Copperfield River. The township was established soon after. As the easily-won alluvial gold began to run out, miners started to pursue gold in the quartz reefs. The first stamper battery commenced operation in May 1909 and a second commenced in April 1910.

Kidston Dam was built on Butcher's Creel in 1915 by the government to provide a reliable water supply to the town and mining operations. The government battery commenced operations in May 1922 using more modern equipment than the private batteries. It operated intermittently up until 1942, rarely at full capacity. It ceased operation for the remainder of World War II, and recommenced operation in 1947, but its last operation was in 1950 following the cessation of mining in the area. Open cut mining had commenced from 1921. Kidston Gold Mines applied to restart modern open cut mining in 1979. Mining continued from 1985 until it was again closed in 2001.

What remains of the town is heritage-listed as the Kidston State Battery & Township.

The 50 MW Kidston Solar Project has been built on the flat surface on top of the tailings heap.

== See also ==
- List of mines in Australia
- Mining in Australia
