= Kidston State Battery & Township =

Kidston State Battery
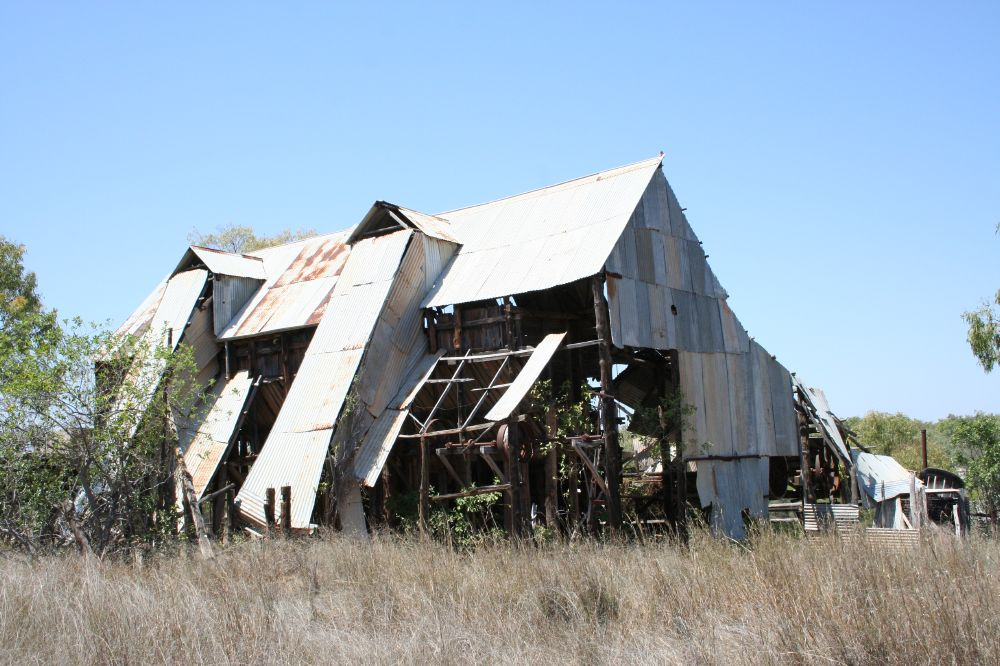
- Kidston State Battery & Township, 2007

- Location within Queensland Location within Australia
- 18.8774°S 144.1666°E
- Location: Georgetown Mining District, Kidston, Einasleigh, Shire of Etheridge, Queensland, Australia

History
- Design period: 1900–1914 (early 20th century)
- Built: 1907–1950

Queensland Heritage Register
- Official name: Kidston State Battery & Township
- Type: state heritage (built, archaeological)
- Designated: 21 October 1992
- Reference no.: 600506
- Significant period: 1907–1950 (fabric, historical)
- Significant components: toilet block/earth closet/water closet, workshop, battery/crusher/stamper/jaw breaker, machinery/plant/equipment – mining/mineral processing, grave marker, pump, forge/blacksmithy, other – mining/mineral processing: component, lock-up, battery shed, tank – water, residential accommodation – housing

Kidston State Battery is a heritage-listed stamper battery at Kidston in Einasleigh, Shire of Etheridge, Queensland, Australia. It was built from 1907 to 1950. It is also known as Kidston Township. It was added to the Queensland Heritage Register on 21 October 1992.

== History ==
Payable gold was discovered on the Copperfield River in September 1907, leading to the Oaks Rush, as the field was initially known. It was declared the Oaks Goldfield in April 1908 and had a peak population of 1,700 by June 1908.

A township developed on the west bank of the Copperfield River. The mining warden noted in August 1908 that tents were being replaced by wood and iron buildings. By the dry season of 1909, the population had fallen dramatically to about 100 alluvial miners using dry blowers, but reefers had started work on the quartz veins. W. Brown's Pioneer mill of five head was erected in May 1909 and W. Suhle and Archbold's large Enterprise mill of five 1,000 pounds (450 kg) stamps was transferred from Georgetown and operating by April 1910.

Kidston, as the township for the Oaks diggings was named, was unusual for a North Queensland goldfield in that the citizens at first successfully excluded public houses and grog shops. However, despite the temperance movement, there were two hotels by 1909, and Kidston developed the usual rowdiness of a bush mining town. There were two halls, a school and a police station. A Kidston citizen's band was formed in 1912. Union activity was more evident and Kidston became more radical than other gold-mining towns in the Etheridge.

Kidston settled into systematic mining and was not directly affected by World War I nor the closure of the Chillagoe smelters. Water supply problems were alleviated in 1915 when a government dam was built on Butchers Creek. A period of high gold prices (1920–24) may have influenced the decision to build the Kidston State Battery. but the gradual decline of the field and the inadequacy of existing crushing equipment also added pressure. In May 1920, the Government Geologist, Dr Harold Ingemann Jensen, recommended that a modern battery be constructed at Kidston. By September the Union Battery at Percyville was being dismantled and the machinery moved to Kidston, while other machinery was obtained from the Big Reef (Castleton). Between eleven and eighteen men were employed establishing a sawmill, supplying the timber and constructing the battery, which commenced operations in May 1922.

During the 1920s, the Oaks Goldfield reached a stage where the large, low-grade deposits were becoming too poor to work in bulk. Consequently, most miners developed smaller, richer reefs which produced low tonnages of ore that were insufficient to keep the battery fully engaged.

In 1923, the battery treated 57 lots of ore totalling 2,611 long tons (2,653 t) yielding 880 ounces (25,000 g) of gold. In 1924 a number of improvements were made to the battery but owing to wet weather which cut off the battery from the mines, 781 long tons (794 t) of ore less were treated but the output rose to 1,391 ounces (39,400 g) of gold. The battery operated from January to November 1925 treating 27 parcels of lower grade ore totalling 1,601 long tons (1,627 t) producing 760 ounces (22,000 g) of gold. Mining quartz in bulk was unprofitable, so only small rich leaders could afford to be worked. In 1926, only nine parcels of ore were treated - 500 long tons (510 t) yielding 456 ounces (12,900 g) of gold. The battery was only working intermittently during the year owing to the lack of supplies.

In 1929, the battery operated efficiently for 78 days. The battery treated 14 parcels of ore totalling 428 long tons (435 t) in 1930 with a yield of 231.5 ounces (6,560 g) of gold. Crushing was only done intermittently. Two additional berdan pans were added in 1930. The introduction of motor transport to the field in 1931 enabled larger amounts of ore to be hauled in to the battery. Water for the battery had to be obtained by sinking into the riverbed. 350 long tons (360 t) of stone were crushed for a yield of 156 ounces (4,400 g) of gold. The school closed in 1930, but 15 buildings still remained in the township.

The battery operated from January to June 1932 and stopped for lack of water. 2,310 long tons (2,350 t) of low grade (4.5 dwts per ton) stone were crushed for a yield of 491 ounces (13,900 g) of gold. The battery operated almost continuously in 1933. A box race brought water to the battery from the Copperfield River. Although 4,420 long tons (4,490 t) of ore were treated, it was of a much lower quality (surface loam) than previously, being only of 3 dwt average per ton. There were many machinery breakdowns in the battery in 1934. Considerable repairs were necessary, including replacement of the Ackroyd wood producer gas generator by a No.6 Hornsby producer gas generator to operate on either coke or charcoal. 5,677 long tons (5,768 t) of stone (much of it surface loam) were crushed for a yield of 756 ounces (21,400 g) of gold (3 dwts per ton).

The cam shaft of the battery broke and the box drain for water from the river was insufficient in 1935, closing it down for repairs. The Hornsby engine was installed in February. 4,560 long tons (4,630 t) of stone were treated for a yield of 663 ounces (18,800 g) of gold. The battery operated 4,094 hours in 1936, producing 980 ounces (28,000 g) of gold from 6,951 long tons (7,063 t) of stone. G. Price at the Town View open cut had 750 long tons (760 t) treated at the Kidston battery for a yield of 55.77 ounces (1,581 g) of gold. The box water race from Copperfield River worked well, as did the new Hornsby gas producer. 57 parcels were dealt with during the year. 66 parcels of ore were treated in 1938. In 1940, 8,020 long tons (8,150 t) of ore from 22 mines were crushed in 3,648 hours of running time for 1,201 ounces (34,000 g) of gold.

The Kidston Battery did not operate during 1942, as miners had left the district and there was no more available. It was decided to close down the battery for the duration of World War II and a caretaker was placed in charge of the battery. There was movement in 1946 to reopen the battery, which attracted some prospectors back to the Oaks field. The battery was reopened in 1947 with Alf Hooley as manager and 1,238 long tons (1,258 t) of stone were treated for a yield of 94 ounces (2,700 g) of gold. Most of the stone treated was bulk samples obtained by H Dickinson from the surrounding hills. Crushing ceased early in 1949 and the battery did not operate after 1950.

The late development of the Oaks Goldfield meant that Kidston did not experience the evolution of building styles shown at earlier mining towns, but was able to take advantage of the ready accessibility of corrugated iron, going straight from tent settlement to iron-clad buildings. Other "imported" building materials were also well represented, there being five weatherboard-clad buildings surviving compared to eight iron buildings. The presence of an operating sawmill during the construction of the State Battery in 1921–22 may also explain the reason for the unusual number of weatherboard buildings. While iron buildings are common in many inland towns of Australia, there are surprisingly few surviving in great numbers in mining towns of North Queensland. Thus the existence of the group of buildings still making up Kidston is more unusual than might appear at first.

== Description ==
=== Kidston State Battery ===
The battery contains three components: the battery shed, an associated cottage, and a water pump. The battery shed is constructed on a bush timber frame with heavy bush timber uprights. The shed is clad in corrugated iron. Components of the crushing plant include timbered ore chutes to two primary crusher pits (one jaw crusher remains in situ), connected by two external ore bucket elevators to the core bins, self-feeding 3 five-head stamp batteries. The two bucket elevators have been removed; however, their vertical housings form a distinctive external feature. The battery launders are intact, but there are no copper amalgam plates. Only one of three slimes tables remains. A gas engine which formed the main power plant has recently been removed. Two berdan pans and a grinding pan remain in situ. A lean-to section alongside the battery building contains a smithy and a small workshop.

Two large elevated iron tanks (riveted fabrication) alongside the battery are fed by pipes connecting with a partly intact twin-cylinder pump which is mounted beside the river. A corrugated iron clad cottage above the pump may have been the battery manager's house. The house is in fair condition and contains garden plots and buildings.

Surviving plant includes:

- Jaw crusher – no brand visible
- Five-head stamp battery – Maryborough Tooth & Co Vulcan Foundry Queensland (on mortar box), Tooth & Co (on iron standards)
- Five-head stamp battery – Stuart & McKenzie Croydon Union Foundry (on mortar box), Tooth & Co (on iron standards)
- Five-head stamp battery (no brand on mortar box), Tooth & Co (on iron standards)
- Slimes separation table
- 2 Berdan pans
- 2 Grinding pans (one in situ)
- Gas producer plant (not in situ)
- Two-cylinder ram pump – no brand (power unit removed).

=== Kidston Township ===
The surveyed portion of the town reserve that lies west of the old Gilberton Road contains surface remains of former buildings including stone surfaces, timber stumps and garden areas. The grave (with headstone) of Edward Albert Martel who died in 1908, is also located in this area. The grave pre-dates the 1917 establishment of Kidston cemetery about 2 kilometres (1.2 mi) north. Martel's grave will be covered by proposed waste dumps.

The built portion of the town reserve occupies the eastern side of the old Gilberton Road, north of the Kidston State Battery through to the western bank of the Copperfield River. This precinct contains six early buildings which remain roofed, but abandoned and derelict, and surface evidence of at least three other buildings. The largest structure in the town is the recent Kidston Gold Mines core store, which is housed under an expansive steel skillion roof. The early police station group alongside the core store includes a derelict weatherboard courthouse and station office, an adjacent corrugated iron clad house, and a weatherboard lock-up and cottage at the rear. About 60 metres (200 ft) south of the police station is a corrugated iron clad building with a detached outhouse that may have formerly been a hotel (possibly the Shamrock Hotel).

Another group of abandoned buildings, including three timber-frame houses, are located about 250 metres (820 ft) south of the battery. This group has a cohesive layout resembling a homestead. An airstrip has been graded over the northern section of the town site.

Kidston cemetery is located about 2 kilometres (1.2 mi) north of the township at 18.8524°S 144.1704°E and is not included in the heritage boundary. The cemetery contains 25 identifiable graves including 10 with headstones. The earliest headstone marks the grave of John Joseph Hall who died on 28 January 1917 at 4 years 3 months. The latest headstone marks the grave of Theodore Lindner, who died in 1939 aged 53 years.

== Heritage listing ==
Kidston State Battery & Township was listed on the Queensland Heritage Register on 21 October 1992 having satisfied the following criteria.

The place is important in demonstrating the evolution or pattern of Queensland's history.

The Kidston battery (including the manager's house and pump) is significant because of the role it played in supporting and extending the life of gold mining in North Queensland after what became the second last major alluvial gold rush in Queensland's history (the Oaks Rush of 1907). Its development and maintenance as a State battery from 1920 to 1950 is significant as demonstrated government support for regional employment and industrial development.

Kidston Township is significant through its association with the Oaks gold rush of 1907, the second last major alluvial rush in Queensland's history. Kidston, through the operation of the State Battery, supported the continuation of gold mining on the Etheridge field until the mid-twentieth century.

The place demonstrates rare, uncommon or endangered aspects of Queensland's cultural heritage.

The survival of a 15 head battery is rare in North Queensland and only the Venus State Battery at Charters Towers has more stamps (20) surviving. The combination of the battery manager's house and pump in relation to the battery and the surviving buildings in the township contribute added significance to the complex and its rarity.

The Stuart & McKenzie 5 head stamp battery manufactured by the Union Foundry, Croydon, is the only surviving stamp battery from this local company to be recorded in North Queensland.

Though now reduced in components and form, Kidston is a rare survivor of a once common pattern of Queensland settlement.

The place has the potential to yield information that will contribute to an understanding of Queensland's history.

Because little subsequent development has disturbed early parts of the settlement, which once had houses and tent dwellings, the potential exists to conduct archaeological survey work to detail the history of the township's development.

The place is important in demonstrating the principal characteristics of a particular class of cultural places.

The battery demonstrates standard technology of the period and the high degree of self-sufficiency common to most isolated and remote mining operations in North Queensland.

Kidston demonstrates the characteristics of a small but persistent goldfield town. Some of its built characteristics reflect its twentieth century origins and distinguish it from earlier counterparts with evolved vernacular building forms. The earliest grave (1908) is in the township, while later burials are in the cemetery north of the town.
