= Kidston, Queensland =

Kidston
- Town
- Interactive map of Kidston
- Coordinates: 18.8736°S 144.1680°E
- Country: Australia
- State: Queensland
- LGA: Shire of Etheridge
- Location: 50 km (31 mi) south of Einasleigh; 380 km (240 mi) west of Townsville; 1,600 km (990 mi) northwest of Brisbane
- Established: 4871

Government
  - State electorate: Traeger
  - Federal division: Kennedy
- Time zone: UTC+10:00 (AEST)

Kidston is a ghost town within the rural locality of Einasleigh, Shire of Etheridge, Queensland, Australia. What remains of the built structure of the town is heritage-listed as the Kidston State Battery & Township.

== History ==
Oak's Rush was a gold mining area. A small amount of gold was found there by Charles Mack who then teamed up with Charles Hawkins and together found more substantial quantities of gold in September 1907. By 1908 there were three hotels in the town.

It is unclear when the Oaks Rush Post Office opened, but in March–April 1908 it was announced it would be renamed Kidston in honour of the Queensland Premier William Kidston. It closed in 1988. By December 1907, at least 120 oz of alluvial gold had been obtained through working about four gullies of tributaries of the Copperfield River, and about 120 men on the field. The Einasleigh Copper Mine had halted as the workers had left for the gold field.

Kidston Provisional School opened on 1 January 1909. On 25 September 1911, it became Kidston State School. It closed on 10 February 1954.

Percyville Provisional School opened in 1914. On 1 April 1915, it became Percyville State School. It closed circa 1915.

Mining ceased in the 1940s. The Kidston Gold Mine resumed as a large open cut mine in the 1980s, and closed in 2001. The tailings heap is now the site of the Kidston Solar Project and the mine and Kidston Dam are being developed for pumped hydro energy storage.
