= Lyndhurst, Queensland =

Lyndhurst
- Suburb
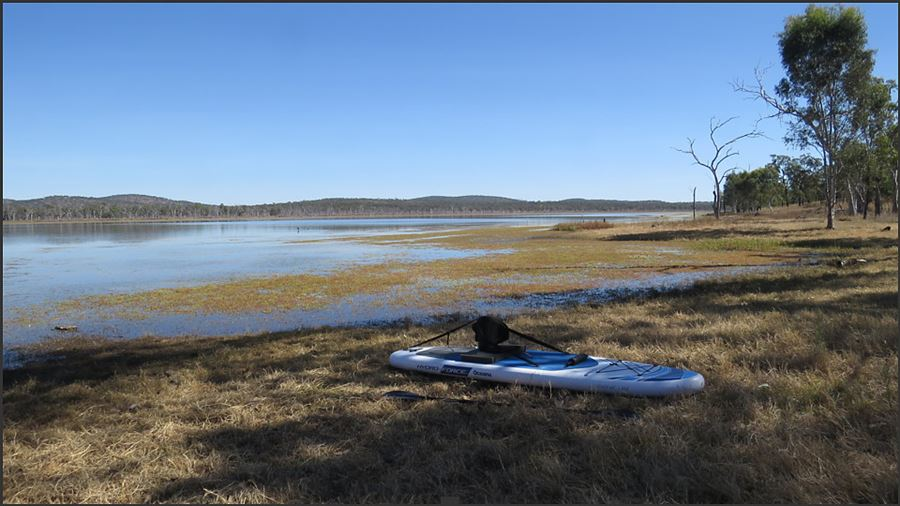
- Emu Swamp in Blackbraes National Park, 2022

- Interactive map of Lyndhurst
- Coordinates: 19.255°S 144.3513°E
- Country: Australia
- State: Queensland
- LGA: Shire of Etheridge
- Location: 100 km (62 mi) SW of Greenvale; 226 km (140 mi) SE of Georgetown; 339 km (211 mi) SW of Innisfail; 352 km (219 mi) W of Townsville; 1,613 km (1,002 mi) NNW of Brisbane

Government
  - State electorate: Traeger
  - Federal division: Kennedy

Area
  - Total: 4,243.8 km^{2} (1,638.5 sq mi)

Population
  - Total: 11 (2021 census)
  - Density: 0.00259/km^{2} (0.00671/sq mi)
- Time zone: UTC+10:00 (AEST)
- Postcode: 4871
Suburbs around Lyndhurst
Forsayth	Einasleigh	Conjuboy
Gilberton	Lyndhurst	Greenvale
Porcupine	Porcupine	Basalt

Lyndhurst is a rural locality in the Shire of Etheridge, Queensland, Australia. In the 2021 census, Lyndhurst had a population of 11 people.

== Geography ==
The terrain is mostly mountainous and bounded to the east by the Great Dividing Range and to the west by the Gregory Range and Gilbert Range. Named peaks include (from north to south):

- Butlers Knob (19.0123°S 144.0519°E) 844 metres (2,769 ft)
- Watch Hill (19.0247°S 144.5389°E) 628 metres (2,060 ft)
- Mount Margaret (19.0878°S 144.3596°E)
- Horse Mountain (19.1927°S 144.3293°E) 728 metres (2,388 ft)
- Mount Lookout (19.2034°S 144.1509°E) 883 metres (2,897 ft)
- Pine Hill (19.2398°S 144.3129°E)
- Mount Devlin (19.2577°S 144.3161°E)
- Teddy Mountain (19.3099°S 144.5760°E) 864 metres (2,835 ft)
- Mount Remarkable (19.3571°S 144.4057°E)

The Einasleigh River rises in the south of the locality and flows north. The Copperfield River rises in the west of the locality and flows to the north-west of the locality. The two rivers have their confluence at the town of Einasleigh in the locality to the immediate north of Lyndhurst. The Einasleigh River has a catchment area of 24,366 square kilometres (9,408 sq mi). Following its confluence with the Gilbert River, they spill into a vast estuarine delta approximately 100 kilometres (62 mi) wide that largely consists of tidal flats and mangrove swamps across the Gulf Country. The Einasleigh River descends 730 metres (2,400 ft) over its 618-kilometre (384 mi) course.

Blackbraes National Park is in the south of the locality with a small extension into neighbouring Porcupine. Apart from this protected area, the predominant land use is grazing on native vegetation.

The Kennedy Developmental Road enters the locality from north-west (Conjuboy) and exits to south-west (Porcupine).

The Lyndhurst pastoral station occupies much of the northern part of the locality. In 1918 the station was reported to be purchased by the government and an area of 1,000 square miles.

== History ==
The town name is derived from the Lyndhurst pastoral station located close to the airstrip in Lyndhurst.

The Lyndhurst pastoral station / pastoral run was established about 1863 by Mr Barnes and John Fulford. The property bred prize-winning Hereford cattle.

Lyndhurst Provisional School opened in 1958 but closed on 5 December 1959. The children were transferred to the Lucky Downs school.

The locality was officially named and bounded on 23 June 2000. Although the origin of the name of the locality is not recorded, it presumably takes its name from the pastoral station.

== Demographics ==
In the 2016 census, Lyndhurst had a population of 8 people.

In the 2021 census, Lyndhurst had a population of 11 people.

== Economy ==
There are a number of homesteads in the locality (from north to south(:

- Welfern (19.0162°S 143.9425°E)
- Ballynure (19.0607°S 143.9992°E)
- Lyndhurst (19.2032°S 144.3708°E) with its airstrip (19.1950°S 144.3712°E) with IATA code LTP and ICAO code YLHS.
- Oak Park (19.2547°S 144.1538°E)
- Werrington (19.3765°S 144.1158°E)
- Black Braes (19.5371°S 144.2053°E)

== Education ==
There are no schools in Lyndhurst. For students living in the eastern part of Lyndhurst, the nearest government primary school is Greenvale State School in neighbouring Greenvale to the east.

However, the distance would be too great for a daily commute from other parts of Lyndhurst. Similarly, there are no nearby secondary school options for any part of Lyndhurst. The alternatives are distance education and boarding school.
