= Kagara Ltd =

Australian mining company

Kagara Limited
- Industry: Mining
- Founded: 1981
- Defunct: 2014
- Headquarters: West Perth, Australia
- Website: www.kagara.com.au

Kagara Limited was an Australian mining company operating in Queensland and Western Australia. The company was founded as Kagara Zinc Inc in 1981, and was based in Perth. Kagara entered voluntary administration on 30 April 2012. It subsequently went into liquidation in 2014.

== Operations ==
Kagara explored, developed and produced copper, zinc, gold, nickel, and lead concentrates. In June 2002 the company was reported to have started construction and waste pre-stripping at its $54m Mount Garnet zinc project in northern Queensland. In June 2008 the company said it would reduce zinc output, which it sold to Korea Zinc Co, to 35,000 tons, but would boost copper production, which it sold to Sterlite Industries. That month it said it planned to buy the Queensland-based Maitland copper deposit Glengarry Resources.

In May 2009 the company reported that production of nickel from the Lounge Lizard deposit in Australia would start in three months, with an estimate of 3,000 tonnes of contained nickel a year. The deposit may contain over 140,000 tonnes of ore, and is one of Australia's largest high-grade nickel ore mines. By January 2010 744 tonnes of development ore had been produced from the deposit, grading 4.4 per cent nickel, and was awaiting treatment. In the 2010 fiscal year, the Mount Garnet polymetallic and copper plants produced 43,970 tons of zinc metal in concentrates, 20,214 tons of copper metal in concentrates and 1,392 tons of lead metal in concentrates. The Thalanga Copper plant produced 3,488 tons of copper metal in concentrates.

In April 2009 Kagara said it had been approached to spin off its gold mining assets, using the cash to reduce debt. In June 2009 the Chinese Guangdong Foreign Trade Group (GFTG) said it would take a 15% stake in Kagara for US$50.7 million. In July 2009 the Australian government approved the deal. That month, the company announced plans to spin off its gold operations, but these were put on hold due to market conditions. In April 2010 Kagara announced the terms of a spin-off of its gold assets, to be named Mungana Goldmines, valued at A$149 million. In May 2010 the government of China approved a $23.8 million investment by GFTG in Mungana Goldmines. Kagara would retain a 49% interest in the operation. Mungana has inferred resources of 1.6 million ounces of gold, 90,000 tonnes of copper and 14 million ounces of silver.

In September 2010 Kagara reported positive results from an initial study of a possible Admiral Bay lead-zinc-silver project in the Kimberley region of Western Australia, and said it had plans to explore the project in more detail in a feasibility study. In October 2010 Kagara made a bid to acquire Copper Strike, a neighboring company in north Queensland, for about A$14.2 million. The main asset of Copper Strike is the Einasleigh project in Queensland, which is south west of Kagara's copper and polymetallic processing facilities at Mount Garnet and north west of its Thalanga polymetallic processing facility. Einasleigh has copper resources of about 16.1 million tonnes. Copper Strike described the bid as "highly opportunistic" in a letter to shareholders. Kagara responded by calling into question Copper Strike's ability to develop the asset on their own.

In January 2011 Kagara said that the recent flooding in southern Queensland had had little effect on its operations apart from the Thalanga operation, where Vomacka open pit was being developed and the Thalanga Polymetallic processing facility was being commissioned. The company said it expected to produce around 23,000 tonnes of copper and 50,000 tonnes of lead and zinc metal in 2011.

However, by 2012 Kagara had been hit hard by the stronger Australian dollar, lower commodity prices and high labour costs. It reported a $48.9 million loss for the first half of the 2012 financial year. In the midst of a restructuring, and a failed attempt to obtain further funding, it entered voluntary administration on 30 April 2012.

The company went into liquidation in early 2014, resulting in significant losses to creditors.
