= Kidston Dam =

Dam and clean energy hub in north-west Queensland, Australia

- Location of the dam in Queensland
- Interactive map of Kidston Dam
- Official name: Copperfield River Gorge Dam
- Country: Australia
- Location: Lyndhurst, Shire of Etheridge, north-western Queensland
- Coordinates: 19°02′10″S 144°07′24″E
- Purpose: Industrial water supply; power generation
- Status: Operational
- Opening date: 1984
- Built by: Hornibrook
- Designed by: GHD Group
- Owner: Queensland Government
- Operators: Department of Natural Resources and Mines, Manufacturing and Regional and Rural Development

Dam and spillways
- Type of dam: Gravity dam
- Impounds: Copperfield River
- Height (foundation): 40 m (130 ft)
- Height (thalweg): 32 m (105 ft)
- Length: 340 m (1,120 ft)
- Elevation at crest: 594 m (1,949 ft)
- Dam volume: 157×10^{3} m^{3} (5.5×10^{6} cu ft)
- Spillway type: Uncontrolled ogee
- Spillway capacity: 8,500 m^{3}/s (300,000 cu ft/s)

Reservoir
- Total capacity: 20,600 ML (16,700 acre⋅ft)
- Catchment area: 1,272 km^{2} (491 sq mi)
- Surface area: 190 ha (470 acres)
- Normal elevation: 579 m (1,900 ft) AHD

Kidston Pumped Storage Project (K2-Hydro)
- Operator: Genex Power
- Commission date: 2025
- Type: Pumped storage
- Turbines: 2
- Installed capacity: 250 MW (340,000 hp)
- Storage capacity: 8 hours
- 2025 generation: 2,000 MWh (7,200 GJ) [upon completion]

The Kidston Dam, also known as the Copperfield Dam and officially as the Copperfield River Gorge Dam, is a concrete gravity dam across the Copperfield River, located in Lyndhurst, in the Shire of Etheridge, in north-western Queensland, Australia. Situated approximately 200 kilometres (120 mi) north of Hughenden and 270 kilometres (170 mi) north-west of Townsville, the dam was built in 1984 for the Kidston Gold Mine, initially for industrial water supply.

Following the 2001 closure of the gold mine, the dam was, in 2017, repurposed to supply water for a clean energy hub located adjacent to the dam, called the Kidston Clean Energy Hub. A separate rock-filled embankment dam, Wises Dam, forms part of the Kidston Pumped Storage Project (K2-Hydro).

== Industrial water supply ==
This dam and its associated pipeline were built in 1984 to supply water to the Kidston Gold Mine. It was built across the Copperfield River, a tributary of the Einasleigh River in the Gilbert River catchment. The dam was one of the first dams built in Australia using the roller compacted concrete technique.

The dam wall is 40 metres (130 ft) high and 340 metres (1,120 ft) long. The resultant reservoir has a capacity of 20,600 megalitres (16,700 acre⋅ft), and forms a surface area of 190 hectares (470 acres) when at full capacity, drawing form a catchment area of 1,272 square kilometres (491 sq mi).

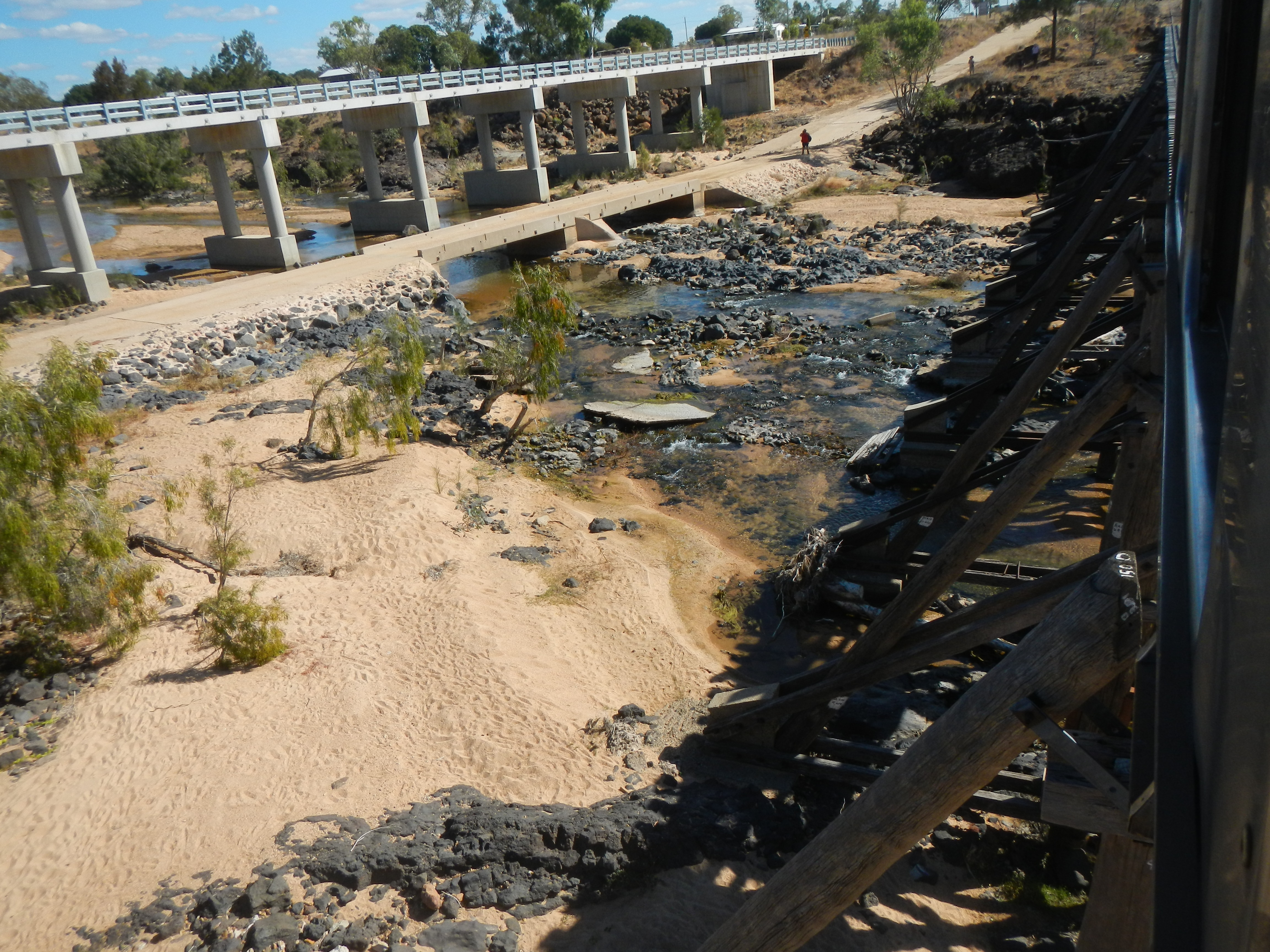
The Copperfield River, in 2013

The gold mine was abandoned in July 2001 and the dam was handed back to the Queensland Government and is managed by the Queensland Department of Energy and Water Supply (DEWS). Downstream properties receive water via a pipeline which was built to supply the mine and associated township. There is also a local arrangement to release water (towards the end of winter) to fill downstream waterholes. This allows riparian properties access to water for stock and domestic use until the coming wet season.

In January 2026, it was reported that the dam burst it banks and caused flooding.

== Clean energy hub ==
Following close of the mine, a 50-megawatt (67,000 hp) solar farm (KS1) was completed in 2017; and, in 2025, a 250-megawatt (340,000 hp) hydroelectric power station (K2-Hydro) was commissioned. A 270-megawatt (360,000 hp) hybrid wind farm (K3-Hybrid) with battery storage is also planned as part of the Kidston Clean Energy Hub, expected to be commissioned from 2028. The hub is operated by Genex Power.

A 187-kilometre (116 mi) 132-kV single-circuit transmission line connects the co-located facilities within the hub to the national grid via a substation at Mount Fox, near Townsville. Following completion of the solar farm and during the planning for the hydro-pumped storage facility, the project signed a ten-year power purchase agreement with EnergyAustralia in 2020, backed by an A$610-million loan from the Northern Australia Infrastructure Facility, and an A$47-million grant from the Australian Renewable Energy Agency.

=== Solar farm ===
The Kidston Solar Project (KS1) is a 50-megawatt (67,000 hp) solar farm on the former mine's tailings heap. It has been generating electricity into the National Electricity Market (NEM) since December 2017.

=== Hydroelectric power station ===
The Kidston Pumped Storage Project (K2-Hydro) is a 250-megawatt (340,000 hp) hydro-pumped storage that was commissioned in 2025.

In 2016, it was suggested that the Kidston Dam was a suitable source to adapt for pumped storage hydroelectricity in order to match supply and demand between the solar farm and the national grid. The following year, additional solar power capacity was recommended, with an annual estimate of 2,000 megawatt-hours (7,200 GJ) of pumped storage, at an expected cost of A$330 million. Completion was initially expected by 2024 at a cost of A$777 million.

At the former gold mine site, two mining pits, being the Wises and Eldridge pits, were repurposed for the hydroelectric plant. The pits contain water with a high mineral content and contamination from the old mining activity. Consequently, water is collected from the surrounding area and pumped into the pits to prevent contamination of the local area. A lined rock-fill embankment was constructed around the original Wises Pit to form the Wises Dam, with its spillway in the form of a pipeline and open channel that connects to the Copperfield River. To help regulate water flow for the plant, a pipeline also connects both the Wises Dam and Eldridge Pit. The upper reservoir for the hydro-pumped storage, Wises Dam, holds 3.75 million cubic metres (132×10^{6} cu ft) of water as active storage, and 1.03 million cubic metres (36×10^{6} cu ft) as extended storage. The lower reservoir, Eldridge Pit, holds 3.25 million cubic metres (115×10^{6} cu ft) of water as active storage, and 1.5 million cubic metres (53×10^{6} cu ft) as extended storage. There is an average drop of 200 metres (660 ft) between the two reservoirs, ranging from 181 to 218 metres (594 to 715 ft).

=== Wind farm ===
The Kidston Hybrid Project (K3-Hybrid) is a planned 150-megawatt (200,000 hp) grid battery, along with a 120-megawatt (160,000 hp) wind farm. If built, it is expected that the wind farm will generate 600 megawatt-hours (2,200 GJ) per annum. As of April 2025, the project was being considered for feasibility and financing.

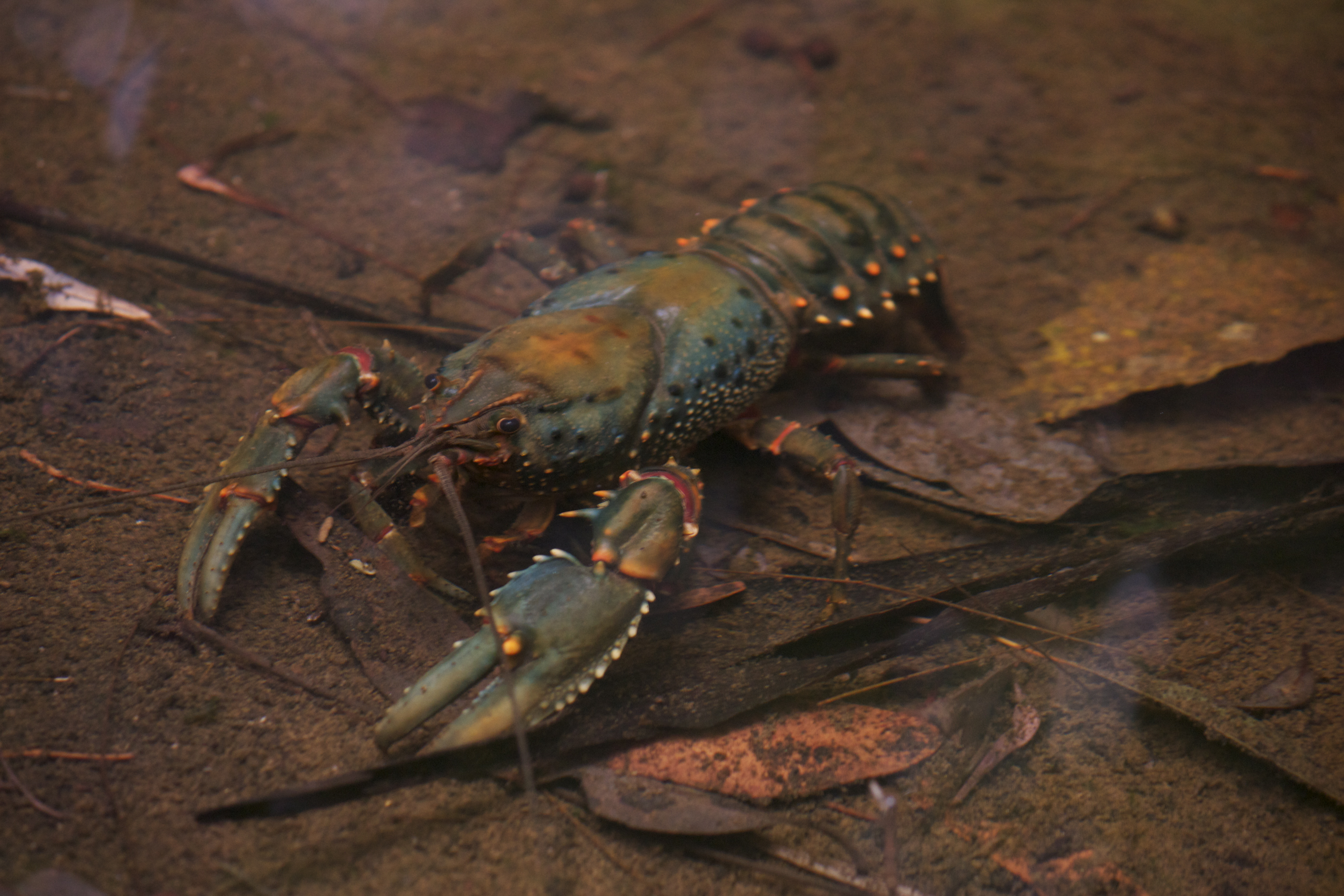
Redclaw

== Fishing ==
The area is popular with recreational fishers. Since 2001, the dam has seen an exponential growth in the redclaw population. Access for fishing boats is via a steep dirt and rock boat ramp next to the dam wall. In 2017, DEWS installed 14 safety warning sign buoys, approximately 100 metres (330 ft) off the dam wall, to alert waterway users of the danger of overtopping the overflow spillway.

== See also ==
- Kidston Solar Project
- List of dams and reservoirs in Australia
- List of hydroelectric power stations in Australia
- List of power stations in Queensland
