= Chillagoe smelters =

Heritage listed smelter in Queensland, Australia

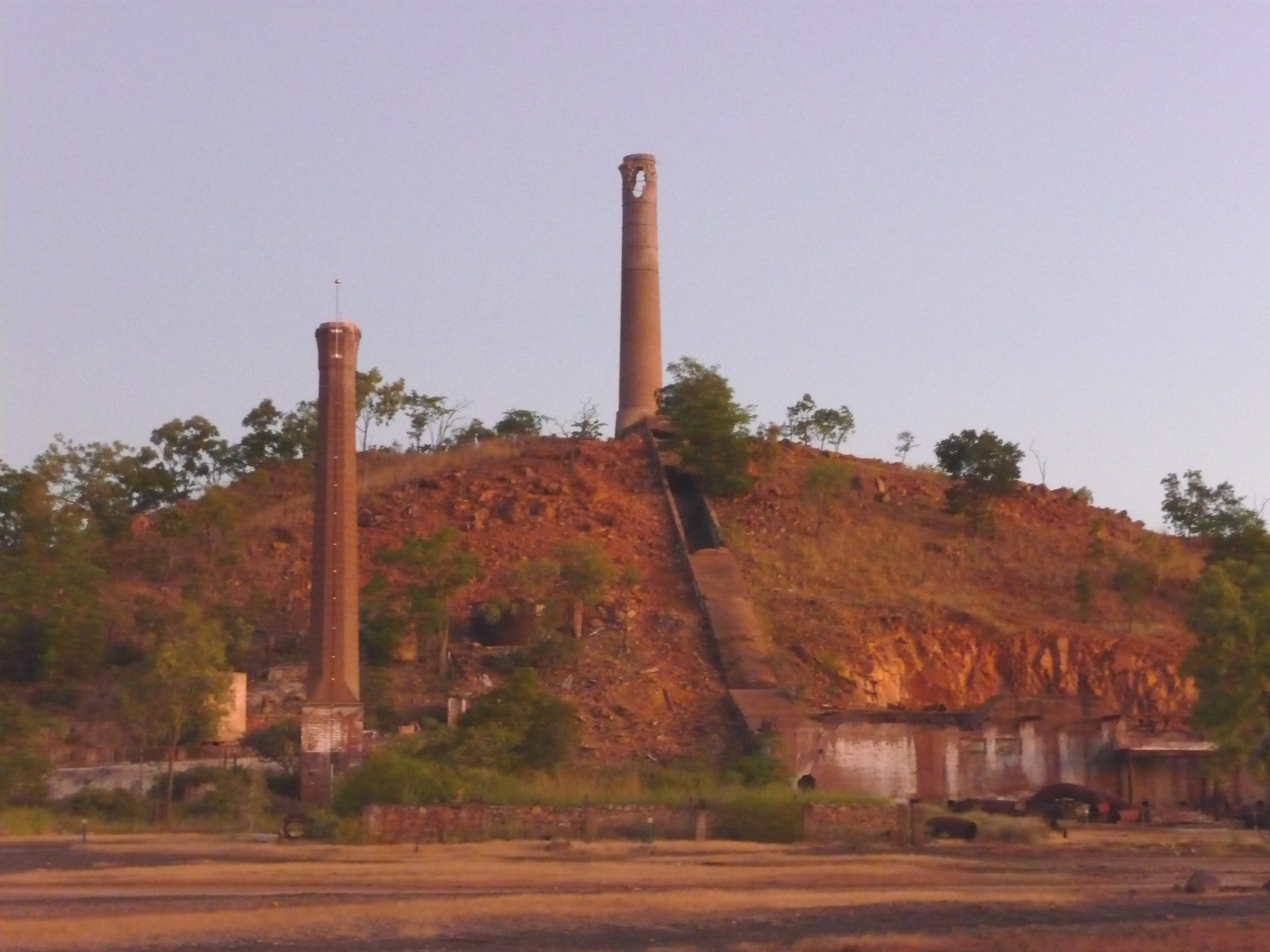
- Chillagoe Smelters, 2009

- Location within Queensland
- 17.1444°S 144.5217°E
- Location: Chillagoe–Mungana Caves National Park, Mareeba Mining District, Chillagoe, Shire of Mareeba, Queensland, Australia

History
- Design period: 1900–1914 (early 20th century)
- Built: 1900–1910s

Queensland Heritage Register
- Official name: Chillagoe Smelters, Chillagoe State Smelters
- Type: state heritage (archaeological, built)
- Designated: 21 October 1992
- Reference no.: 600675
- Significant period: 1900–1910s (fabric); 1901–1914, 1920–1943 (historical)
- Significant components: embankment – railway, machinery/plant/equipment – mining/mineral processing, residential accommodation – housing, weir, slag pile/slag heap, flue, chimney/chimney stack

The Chillagoe smelters is a heritage-listed refinery at Chillagoe-Mungana Caves National Park, Mareeba Mining District, Chillagoe, Shire of Mareeba, Queensland, Australia. It operated in the early 1900s. It is also known as Chillagoe State Smelters. It was added to the Queensland Heritage Register on 21 October 1992.

In its heyday the Chillagoe Smelters were the centre of a thriving mining industry that brought wealth and development to the Chillagoe area. By June 1901, when the railway was completed, Chillagoe was a flourishing town. The railway enabled equipment for the large, innovative Chillagoe Smelters to become operative by September 1901. The Chillagoe Railway & Mining Company equipped its work sites with the most up-to-date machinery and the surrounding mines at Mungana, Zillmanton and Redcap worked on a large scale. At times, the mines, railway and smelter provided employment for up to 1,000 workers.

Chillagoe Smelter operated until 1943 and in its 40 odd year lifetime treated 1,250,000 long tons (1,270,000 t) of ore, yielded 60,000 long tons (61,000 t) of copper, 50,000 long tons (51,000 t) of lead, 181 long tons (184 t) of silver and 5 long tons (5.1 t) of gold. By 1943, other smelters were built closer to the then major ore producing areas such as Mount Isa. Easy access to these areas outweighed the economic usefulness of the state run Chillagoe Smelter. In 1950, the buildings and equipment were auctioned. Today the site is managed by Queensland Parks and Wildlife Service.

== History ==
The first explorer in the Chillagoe region was James Venture Mulligan on his 1874 exploration trip. Then William Atherton took up pastoral leases in 1887 and built a timber homestead on the bank of Chillagoe Creek.

John Moffat sent the first prospecting party into the area in mid 1887 and they pegged many surface shows. Mining on a serious scale began in the district in 1892 at Muldiva, where Moffat's company commenced silver production. Unfortunately a few months before the silver price crashed and the newly built smelter only operated for eighteen months. Moffat erected small exploratory smelters at Calcifer in 1894 and at Girofla (Mungana) in 1896.

In 1896, with mining developments at Mount Lyell (Tasmania) and Kalgoorlie (Western Australia) causing great interest, Moffat sought to raise large scale capital to develop the Chillagoe field. In Melbourne, the heartland of Australian mining investment, he interested a syndicate of capitalists, including James Smith Reid, in a scheme to purchase his leases, to build smelting works and to construct a private railway more than 150 kilometres (93 mi) from the government railhead at Mareeba to the mines and smelter. A company called Chillagoe Proprietary Limited was formed in Melbourne and placed its proposal before the Queensland Government. Before the end of 1897, the Mareeba to Chillagoe Railway Act authorised the company to carry out its plans and granted it generous concessions.

Construction on the smelter site commenced in mid 1900 while the railway work was underway, and proceeded slowly, as all materials had to be carried overland from the advancing railhead which reached Chillagoe in August 1901.

In mid 1900, the Chillagoe Company had operating: three boilers, three steam engines 46 horsepower (34 kW), one active reduction works, two pumps, 0.5 miles (0.80 km) of 2-foot (0.61 m) tramway, 2,600 feet (790 m) of water mains, two brick machines, one clay mill, two saw benches, one traction engine, and a dam constructed, valued at a total of £4,120. Walkers of Maryborough contracted for the iron frames of the furnaces and Jack and Newell were agents for a large amount of the smaller material for the construction of the smelters. The proposed smelting plant being erected under the supervision of J. M. Higgins (former metallurgist of Dry Creek Works, South Australia) and R. Shepherd (the construction engineer who had supervised the erection of the Mount Lyell smelters) was to treat 100 long tons (100 t) of ore per day and comprise six furnaces. By 1901 there were five boilers, ten steam engines 167 horsepower (125 kW), nine pumps, two rock breakers, one brick machine, six furnaces, four blowers, two lathes, three drilling machines, one traction engine, several small machines, one roller, and two grinders, valued at a total of £23,444.

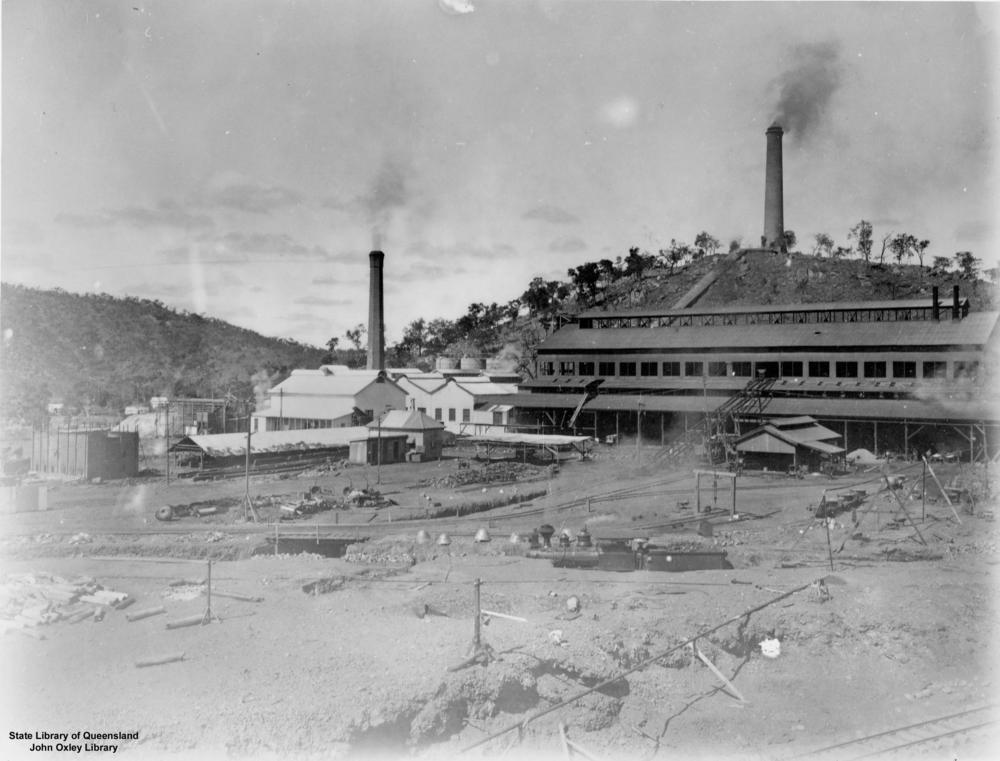
Chillagoe Smelting Works, circa 1906

Six furnaces were blown in on 13 October 1902, but did not run freely, treating only 8,129 long tons (8,259 t) of ore for 5 ounces (140 g) of gold, 367 long tons (373 t) of copper, 15,721 ounces (445,700 g) of silver, valued at £23,792, and the works were shut down for reconstruction of the company. A major problem was the lack of ore which was only being obtained from Redcap and Calcifer. The company had hoped to receive ore from Mount Garnet also. Managers changed frequently, Frederick Back in 1903 and Thomas James Greenway in 1904. In the early years of operations the Chillagoe smelter treated lead ore from Girofla mine and Torpy's Crooked Creek silver lead mine, producing 17,661 long tons (17,944 t) of lead and 357,196 ounces (10,126,300 g) of silver in 1904. The converters were blown in on 21 January 1905.

In 1907, the Huntingdon-Heberlein process plant was erected at a cost of £60,000. Extensive excavations were done and rails laid to ore bins on the hill opposite the main smelters. The process flow involved - rock breaker, converter kettles for 12 hours desulphurising process, then to the lead furnaces. A new electric plant was also installed.

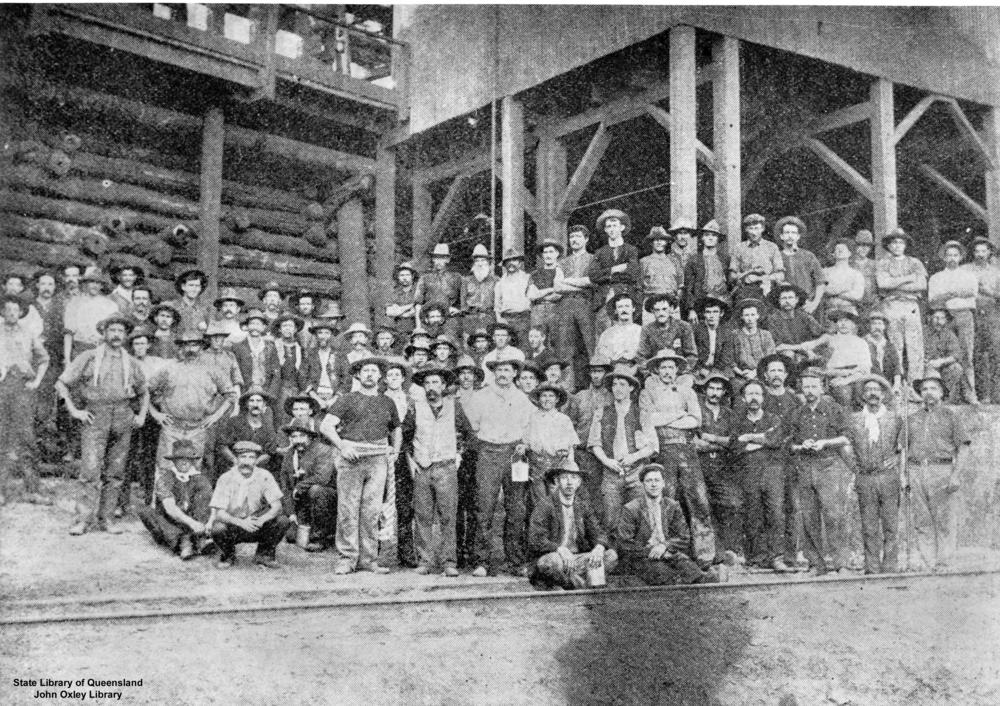
Workers from the Chillagoe Smelting Works, circa 1907

A new lead furnace was blown in on 21 January 1908. However, in 1908 there was hardly a mine operating outside of the company mines as an outcome of wage increases with the emergence of unions and declining copper prices. The new copper furnace was blown in on 20 February 1908 and the converter plant was operating effectively by early March that year. Much better lead recoveries were noticeable after the second converter was introduced into the line, and ores had to be preliminarily roasted as well. At a cost of £70,000 the Chillagoe Railway and Mines Company Pty Limited could treat sulphide ores from its Mungana mines as well as public ore. They could also treat the Penzance (Redcap), Boomerang (Calcifer) and Calcifer slag dump material, along with self-fluxing mixture with Ruddygore ore. To achieve this the company had to extend its tramline from the Chillagoe railway at Harper Siding to the Boomerang and Calcifer slag dump.

By 1909, the lead price had fallen markedly and the Huntingdon-Heberlein plant had to be partially shut down.

A fourth blast furnace was installed in 1909 to treat the copper ore. A larger air-blowing machine also improved the copper smelting. A heavy duty horizontal compound condensing steam engine with duplex air cylinders could blow two converter stands at once. A new high pressure motor-driven air compressor supplied air to the pneumatic ram used for relining converter vessels. A DC generator was ordered for the motors and lighting. The ore sampling floor was doubled in capacity. A high-lift motor-driven centrifugal pump for pumping furnace jacket water was added. A new sample crushing office was attached with electric motors driving the pulverizers.

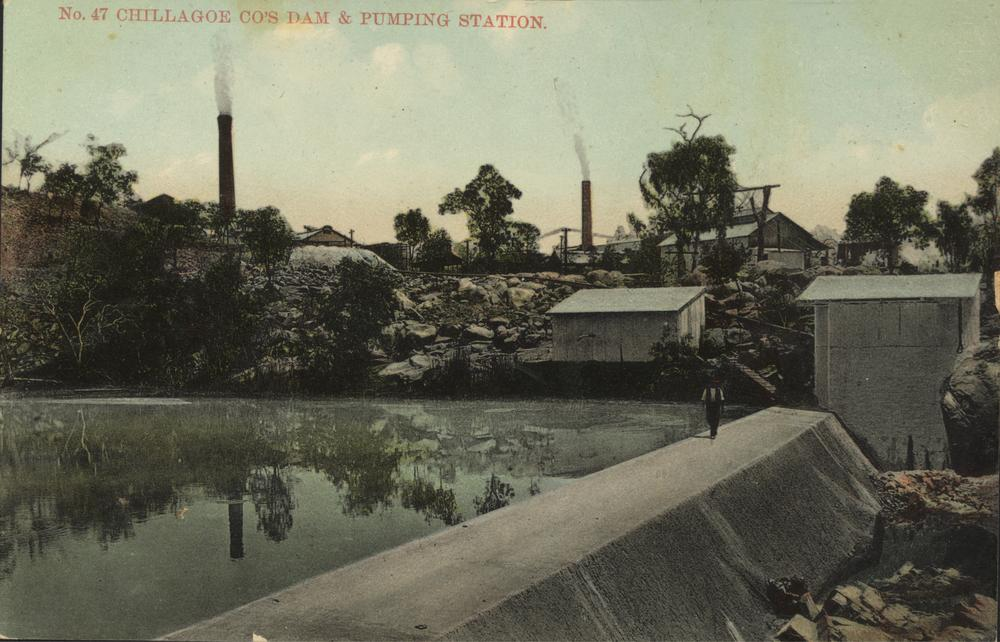
Chillagoe Company's dam and pumping station, circa 1910

Ore supplies locally were poor in 1910 and ore was scavenged across the Etheridge Goldfield to supply Chillagoe smelters. The roasting furnaces were supplied with all the Etheridge gold mine dumps, the copper smelters worked on sintered Havelock residues, along with Mungana copper-lead oxides and clean lead ores from the Lady Jane, Girofla and Etheridge mines. Overhead central flues were fitted over the copper and lead furnaces.

Heavy rain on the Etheridge watershed washed away the Tate and Lynd River railway bridges and the Chillagoe smelters had to close between 19 April and 3 May 1911. Copper smelting only operated for half the year. The copper furnace was remodelled in May 1911 with extra battery jackets replacing the brick shaft. The forehearths of cast iron were also replaced by riveted mild steel. The tanks were lined with chrome bricks. A 42-inch (1,100 mm) Dwight-Lloyd unit for the palate sintering process was completed by November 1911. However a large part of the smelter, including an electric crane, was destroyed by fire. The damage was quickly repaired and the smelter recommenced in February 1912.

Sixty feet of the main stack dust flue collapsed in May 1912. Rebuilding was completed by 13 June. A temporary chimney was used for the lead smelters only. In early June 1912 the Chillagoe lead smelter was closed down and 50 men laid off. The water jacket on the copper smelter burst and copper smelting also closed down. The lead smelter resumed on 2 August 1912 and the copper smelter on 4 September 1912. Both furnaces ran until October when the coke ran out. The Huntingdon- Heberlein furnace was out of commission. The roasting works operated solely on Mungana sulphide ores and on ore from Torpy's Crooked Creek mine. The Chillian mill (No.8 ball mill) operated on the fine ores.

In 1913, the smelters operated only intermittently. The company had men cleaning flues and working in the railway workshops. Union efforts to obtain a 44-hour week were also influential in the closure. Above all, the fall in company profits determined a bleak future for the Chillagoe smelters. The receipts for 1912 were insufficient to pay even the interest on the debentures. In February 1914 J. S. Reid approached the Queensland Government for £30,000 assistance. The Government refused and the company closed the smelters immediately. The mining press lamented the continual failures of the Chillagoe company in its history.

The smelters remained closed from March 1914 until January 1920. This was the World War I boom time for metal prices and other copper smelting companies, especially in the Cloncurry district, experienced the greatest prosperity they had ever known while Chillagoe was closed.

In July 1915, six weeks after the election of the Ryan-Theodore Labor Government the Chillagoe Company approached the Government about the sale of the railway. By Christmas the Government had found the possible means of funding upgrading of the smelters and mines by a mortgage over the railway. The agreement between the Queensland Government and the debenture and shareholders had to be passed by Parliament. The Legislative Council rejected the first bill and a second one was introduced in November 1917. The bill passed in November 1918, four days after the Armistice which ended the metals boom, and gave title to the Queensland Government over the railway for £661,000, smelters £30,000, Einasleigh mine £9,000, mining plant and machinery £1,000.

Peter Goddard was appointed Manager of Chillagoe smelters on 22 April 1919 for three years at a salary of £1,500 per annum. The smelters were administered by the Minister for Mines under the State Enterprises Act 1918 and under the Chillagoe and Etheridge Railways Act 1918.

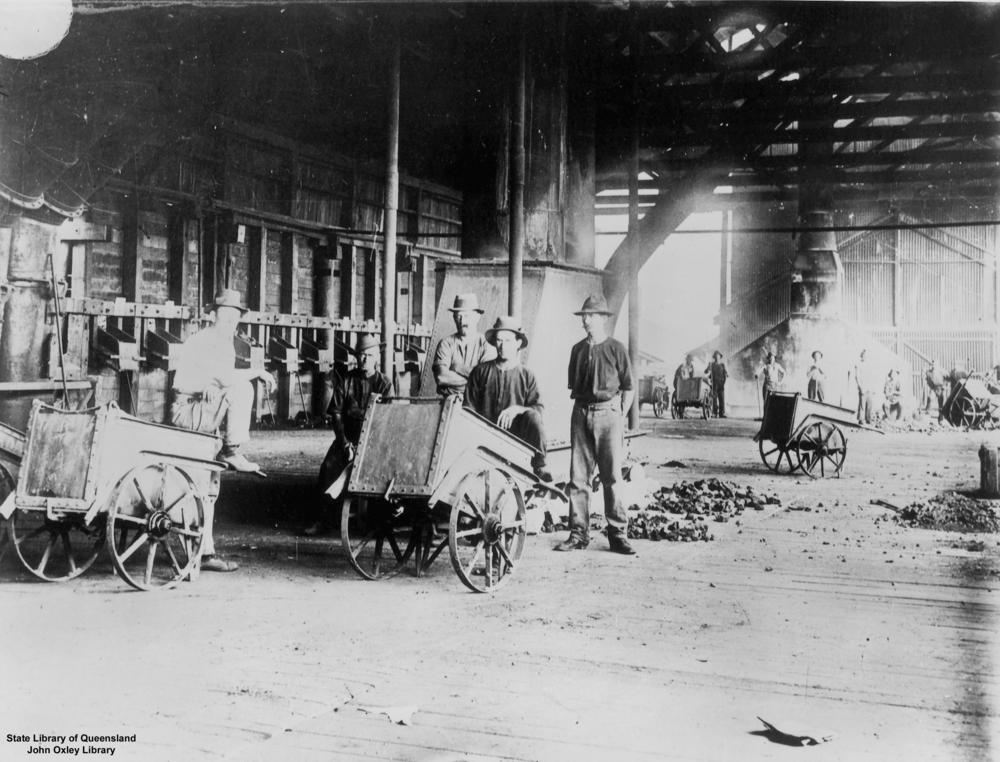
Inside the Chillagoe Smelting Works, circa 1920

Smelting recommenced in January 1920 with one copper and one lead furnace in blast. The smelters settled into a steady run of seven years production, drawing their copper ore supplied from Einasleigh mine and lead ore from the Girofla mine at Mungana. Metal prices continued to decline.

The State acquired the Mungana mines in 1922 and consolidated their smelter ore supplies. In 1921, the sole remaining asset of the old Chillagoe Company, the Mount Mulligan coal mine was shut by an underground explosion which killed all 75 miners underground and finally ruined the company. It was wound up in 1923 and the State acquired the coal mine only to discover that the coke works which had been under construction for years were useless as the coal was not suitable for coking.

Ore supplies continued to be a problem after the Einasleigh mine closed in 1922 and the Girofla and Lady Jane mines were handed over to tributers in 1926. Ore came via railways in varying parcels from all over North Queensland and the Cloncurry field

The 1920s were a controversial period with wide dissatisfaction and local rumour surrounding the involvement of Peter Goddard (mine manager), Dunlop (mining warden), William McCormack (Queensland Treasurer), and Fred Reid (mine owner), in corrupt activities at the Chillagoe smelters and the mines. Opposition parliamentarians asked numerous questions in Parliament and after the election of a conservative government in 1929 and the appointment of Ernest Atherton, as Mines Minister, a Royal Commission was established to investigate the operations of the Chillagoe smelter and mines. (Atherton was a former Chillagoe and O.K. butcher, an Almaden ore-buyer and member of the Chillagoe pastoral family.) The smelters were re-opened in October 1929 while the Royal Commission into the Mungana affair (as it became known) was underway. The subsequent litigation against Ted Theodore, William McCormack, Reid and Goddard in the Supreme Court in 1931 destroyed the political careers of both Theodore, then Federal Treasurer, and McCormack.

Despite the uneconomic returns, the smelters continued to operate. In 1932 Chillagoe produced its highest ever annual copper output of over 3,000 long tons (3,000 t), but 1933 was the last year of lead production from stockpiled ores. Coke costs at Chillagoe were brought down after 1933 when the Bowen State coke works opened, but this relief was not enough to offset the falling copper price.

The Chillagoe State smelters were being run as an instrument of the State's welfare policy, to create work in the depressed mining districts.

World War II saw a surge in base metal prices. In 1942 the Australian government conducted a review of base metal production throughout Australia, and in the cold light of wartime emergency, the Chillagoe smelters showed up badly. As a run-down, forty year old smelter which made a loss every year, operating at less than a quarter of its planned capacity, with more than half its ore being railed nearly a thousand miles from the Cloncurry mineral field, it could not be allowed to survive. The controller of Mineral Production directed Mount Isa Mines to commence producing copper and this occurred in April 1943. The Chillagoe smelters closed for the fourth and final time in July 1943.

By the time of the final closure the total debt was over £453,451, the figure on 31 March 1940 when the Co-ordinator General decided not to spend any more money on the Chillagoe smelters from the Income (State Development) Tax funds. The files on the disposal of the smelters equipment and machinery record the official dispersal of items on the smelters site. Small machines and tools went to the Collinsville State Coal Mine in 1946 and secondhand bricks were sold off to private buyers. Part of the smelters were dismantled in 1949 and delivered to other departmental operations. The Queensland Government wrote off the figure of £2,832 on 30 June 1954 when the only remaining assets were an unsaleable building valued at £50 and the annual rent of a horse paddock for £10.

Since then the site has only been utilised for collection of slag for use as ballast on the Chillagoe and Etheridge Railways, and since the 1970s by tourists. There have also been unsuccessful mining lease applications in the 1980s to use the slag for sand blasting material.

The Chillagoe smelters produced copper in 37 of the years between 1901 and 1943 and lead in 25 of those years. The smelters total production can be summarised as follows:

Ore treated 1,250,000 long tons (1,270,000 t) Copper production 60,000 long tons (61,000 t) Lead production 50,000 long tons (51,000 t) Silver production 6,500,000 ounces (180,000,000 g) Gold production 175,000 ounces (5,000,000 g)

One million long tons (1,016,000 t) of slag (as a minimum estimate) was poured onto the dump at Chillagoe. Chillagoe never made a profit in any year and the smelters probably lost their two owners a total of between £4,000,000 and £5,000,000.

== Description ==
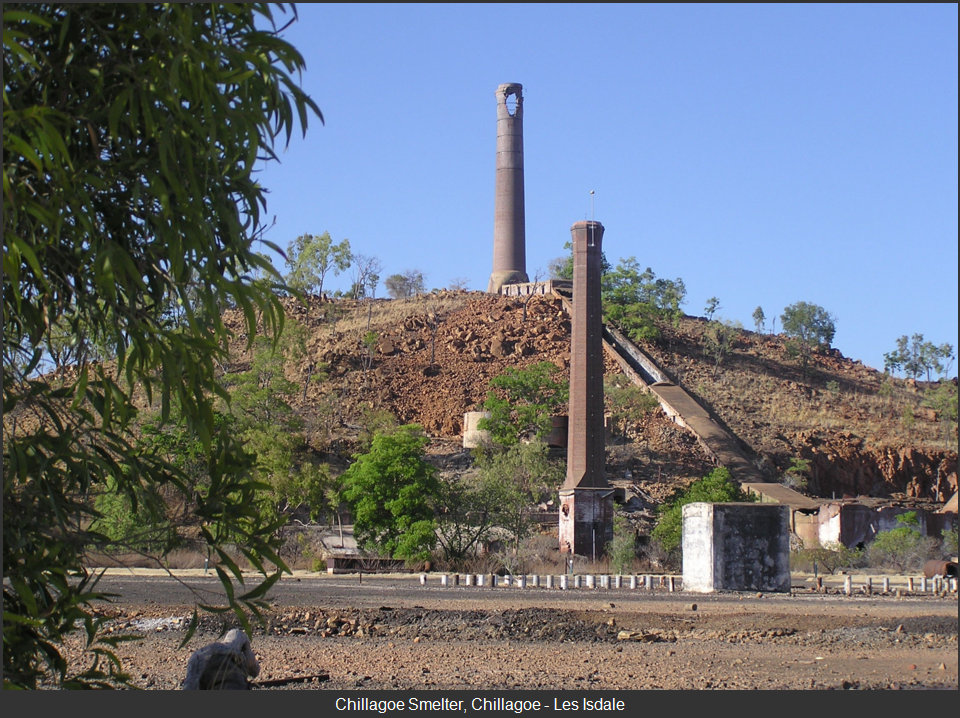
Smelters, 2020

The main smelter area contains the steel column mounts of two blast furnaces and evidence of two additional furnace mounts. A steel gooseneck flue atop the western furnace mount has recently collapsed. The most visible features of the area are a long brick flue which formed the base of the smelter shed charge floor before ascending the hill to the main smelter chimney. This brick chimney, which is round in section, dominates the smelter works and the township. The top of this chimney has been damaged by lightning strikes and is in poor condition.

Adjacent to the main smelter area is the power house, workshops and water softener plant foundations. The power house chimney is octagonal in section and is the most intact of the three brick chimneys at the site. The top of this chimney has recently been stabilised as part of a conservation program. Adjacent to the west of the blast furnace site is a matte re-heating furnace and four converters.

The lead sulphide pre-treatment area, which is opposite the main smelter area, contains furnace foundations and plant remains for roasting and sintering, including a Dwight-Lloyd sintering plant, Edwards roasters, Huntington Heberlein plant, and the site of an original Edwards roaster furnace adjacent to a third brick chimney, known as the roaster chimney, which is round in section. Remains of a crusher are alongside the chimney.

From the smelter and pre-treatment areas the surface of a large slag dump extends eastward to the bank of Chillagoe Creek. A concrete weir and foundations of a pump house are situated on the creek. Evidence of the smelter housing precinct lies across the creek from the slag dump. One family house survives in situ. Railway formations and earth embankments extend west from the smelter and pre-treatment areas to Smelter Junction on the Cairns-Mungana line. The foundations of an assay office, general office, stores, weighbridge and railway workshops are located in this area.

The surviving plant includes:

- Primary crusher parts
- No 5 Gates Gyratory Breaker & Krupp rolls
- 4 Copper converter vessels
- Blast furnace steel mounts - Walkers Ltd.
- 3 Blast furnace vats (none in situ)
- Virginia firebricks
- roaster chimney
- Huntington Hebelein plant

== Heritage listing ==
Chillagoe Smelters was listed on the Queensland Heritage Register on 21 October 1992 having satisfied the following criteria.

The place is important in demonstrating the evolution or pattern of Queensland's history.

The Chillagoe smelters are significant in Queensland history as an important element in the great age of mining industry from 1870 to 1914 which opened North Queensland to settlement by Europeans. For much of the period from 1901 to 1943 the Chillagoe smelters and their ancillary industries were major components of the economic activity of the Cairns hinterland.

"... the legacy of this grandly inept company was the infrastructure of an entire mineral industry which the State could never have afforded to build for itself, and which functioned in the public interest for over twenty years at very little capital cost. Under both the company and the State, the Chillagoe venture created thousands of jobs, provided railway transport over enormous distances, and kept mines and businesses open throughout the north. Although the Chillagoe smelters never once made a profit, the multiplier effects radiating from them were responsible for a significant proportion of North Queensland's prosperity for nearly fifty years. In the last years the smelters were deliberately being run at a loss by the State in order to continue this economic role in the wider community".

Its operation as a State enterprise is significant in its regional history.

The place demonstrates rare, uncommon or endangered aspects of Queensland's cultural heritage.

The size, scale and evidence of, now rare, smelting processes are preserved in the physical remains at the Chillagoe smelters. The three tall brick chimneys surviving at the site are unique as a group. The slag dump is the largest remaining in Queensland.

The place is important in demonstrating the principal characteristics of a particular class of cultural places.

There are only a small number of mining sites in Queensland historically comparable to Chillagoe - Mount Morgan, Mount Isa, Mount Perry and Mount Elliott, and only Chillagoe retains the evidence of the smelting process.

Although the site has been stripped of most of its plant, what remains is sufficient to interpret the operation of the smelters, working conditions and health and safety considerations at Chillagoe.

The smelter site has strong visual and social associations with the Chillagoe township and functional associations with the railway. The location of the smelter is enhanced by the topography between ridges and creek.

The place is important in demonstrating a high degree of creative or technical achievement at a particular period.

The Chillagoe smelters aptly demonstrate the technology of mineral (copper, silver, lead and gold) smelting at the turn of the century, when up-to-date plant was, assembled and then modified repeatedly between 1901 and 1911 to meet local conditions.

The place has a special association with the life or work of a particular person, group or organisation of importance in Queensland's history.

The Chillagoe smelters are associated with the careers of mining entrepreneurs, John Moffat and J. S. Reid, with the development of the Amalgamated Workers Association, and with the political affairs of Labor leaders, William McCormack and Edward Theodore, whose careers were ruined by the Mungana Affair.

== See also ==
- Mining in Australia
