= Kidston Solar Project =

Solar farm in Queensland, Australia

Kidston Solar Farm
- Country: Australia
- Location: Kidston
- Coordinates: 18°53′19″S 144°08′21″E
- Owner: Genex Power

Solar farm
- Type: Standard PV

Power generation
- Nameplate capacity: 50 MW
- Capacity factor: 26.4 %

External links
- Website: www.genexpower.com.au/270mw-kidston-solar-project.html

Kidston Solar Project is a photovoltaic solar power station built on top of the former Kidston Gold Mine utilising the tailings storage facility in northern Queensland, Australia. The project consists of two solar farms, KS1 and KS2. The Kidston Solar Project is the first of four projects that comprise the Kidston Clean Energy Hub also occupying this area. The site is located adjacent to an existing substation and a 132-kV transmission line.

== Overview ==
The Kidston Solar Project generates up to 145 Gigawatt hours of renewable electricity per year. In total, there are 540,000 panels that makes up the project, manufactured by company First Solar Inc on a single axis tracking system. The photovoltaic panels are mounted on the tracking system which shifts the angle of the panels to follow the sun.

Financial close was reached in February 2017 for KS1, with first energisation occurring in November 2017. It was fully commissioned and is operational, connected to the existing transmission line powered by Ergon Energy and generating electricity into the National Electricity Market.

The $115-million construction was fully-funded, and the project was built on-time and on-budget via the project's EPC contractor, UGL. Financing was underpinned by a 20-year Revenue Support Deed with the Queensland Government for 100% of the energy generated from the project, in addition to a $8.9 million funding grant provided by the Australian Renewable Energy Agency.

In April 2022, Kidston Solar Project was rated as the best-performing solar farm in Australia, with a capacity factor of 26.4%.

== Other clean energy projects at Kidston ==
=== Hydroelectric power station ===
The Kidston Pumped Storage Project (K2-Hydro) is a 250-megawatt (340,000 hp) hydro-pumped storage that was commissioned in 2025.

=== Wind farm ===
The Kidston Hybrid Project (K3-Hybrid) is a planned 150-megawatt (200,000 hp) grid battery, along with a 120-megawatt (160,000 hp) wind farm. When commissioned, it is expected that the wind farm will generate 600 megawatt-hours (2,200 GJ) per annum. As of April 2025, the project was being considered for feasibility and financing. Earlier plans were for a 258-megawatt (346,000 hp) wind farm and 270 megawatts (360,000 hp) additional solar generating capacity.

== See also ==
- Kidston Dam
- List of power stations in Queensland
- Solar power in Australia
