= Einasleigh River =

River in Queensland, Australia

Einasleigh
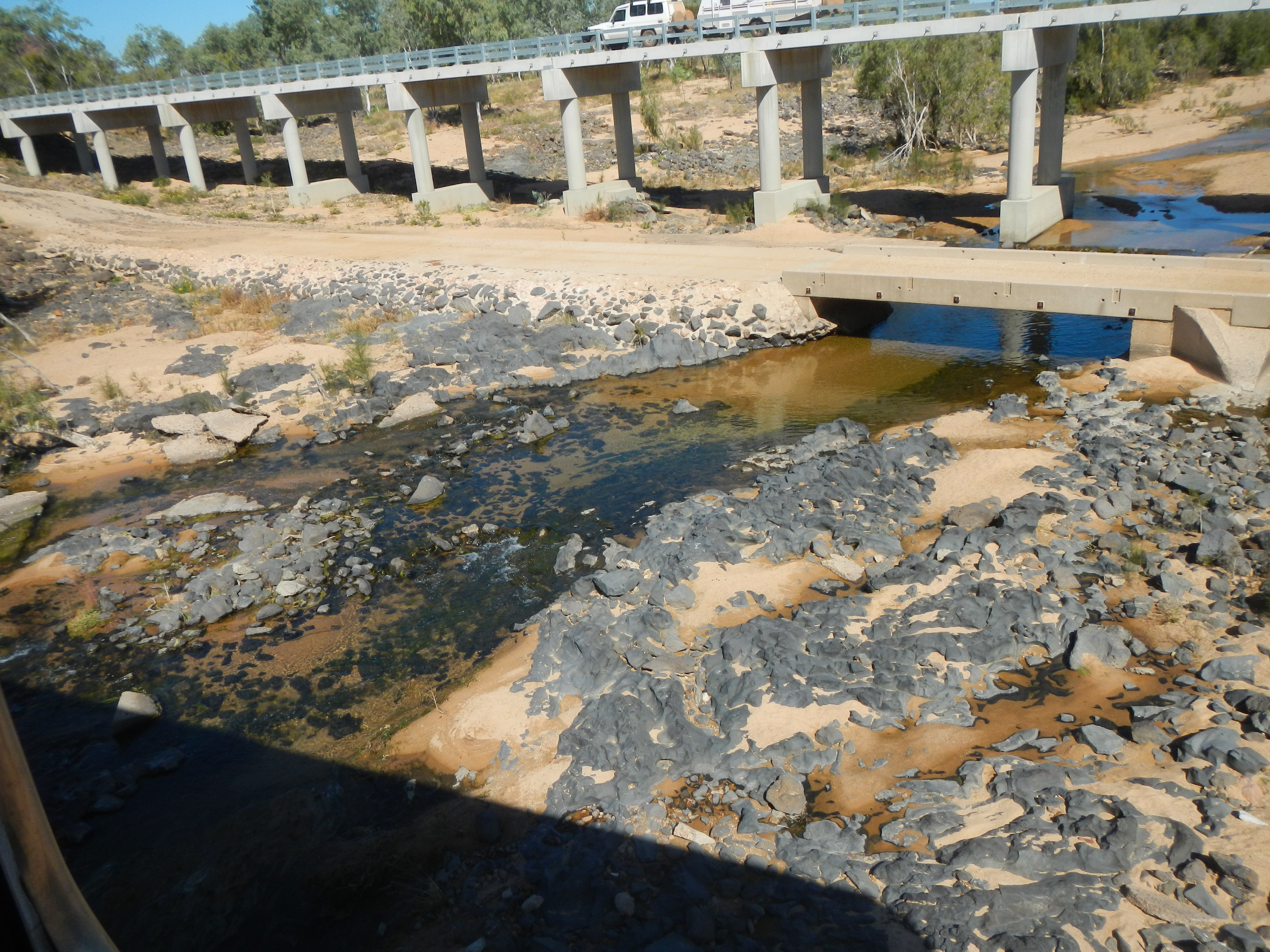
- Einasleigh River old and new crossings

- Location of Einasleigh River mouth in Queensland

Location
- Country: Australia
- State: Queensland
- Region: Far North Queensland

Physical characteristics
- Source: Lyndhurst, Shire of Etheridge
  - location: southeast of Georgetown
  - coordinates: 19.5424°S 144.2806°E
  - elevation: 809 m (2,654 ft)
- Mouth: confluence with the Gilbert River
  - coordinates: 17°29′42″S 142°16′14″E
  - elevation: 79 m (259 ft)
- Length: 618 km (384 mi)

Basin features
- River system: Gilbert River catchment
- Tributaries
  - left: Copperfield River, Etheridge River
- Lagoons: Eight Mile Waterholes

The Einasleigh River is a river in Far North Queensland, Australia. When combined with the Gilbert River, the river system is the largest in northern Australia.

== Course and features ==
The Einasleigh River rises in the locality of Lyndhurst in the Einasleigh Uplands within the Atherton Tableland, draining the western slopes of the Great Dividing Range below Mount Remarkable. The river flows generally north, northwest and then west. The river is joined by 33 tributaries from source to mouth including the Copperfield and Etheridge rivers and numerous creeks before reaching its confluence with the Gilbert River north of Croydon. The Einasleigh River has a catchment area of 24,366 square kilometres (9,408 sq mi). Following its confluence, the Gilbert River spills into a vast estuarine delta approximately 100 kilometres (62 mi) wide that largely consists of tidal flats and mangrove swamps across the Gulf Country. The Einasleigh River descends 730 metres (2,400 ft) over its 618-kilometre (384 mi) course.

East of Georgetown the river is crossed by the Einasleigh River Bridge that carries the Gulf Developmental Road.

The Einasleigh River is a seasonal stream and discharge can vary greatly depending on the intensity of the monsoon. When combined with the Gilbert River, the Einasleigh River has the sixth-highest discharge of any river in Australia, slightly less than that of the Potomac in North America. In an intense wet season, however, the discharge can be as large as that of the Fraser River in Canada, and in a mild wet season like that of 1951–52, the discharge can be as little as one tenth of the long term mean. It is estimated that runoff from the combined Gilbert-Einasleigh River system totals about 2.2 percent of the total runoff from Australia. The record major flood of the Gilbert River was in January 1974, and the floods of February 1991 and in January and February 2009 caused widespread road closures and inundation of properties throughout the catchment.

== See also ==
- List of rivers of Australia § Queensland
