= Fielding, Queensland =

Fielding
- Suburb
- Interactive map of Fielding
- Coordinates: 18.8315°S 141.2897°E
- Country: Australia
- State: Queensland
- LGA: Shire of Carpentaria
- Location: 157 km (98 mi) SW of Croydon; 164 km (102 mi) S of Normanton; 496 km (308 mi) NE of Mount Isa; 694 km (431 mi) WSW of Cairns; 1,886 km (1,172 mi) NW of Brisbane

Government
  - State electorate: Traeger
  - Federal division: Kennedy

Area
  - Total: 3,937.1 km^{2} (1,520.1 sq mi)

Population
  - Total: 0 (2021 census)
  - Density: 0.00000/km^{2} (0.0000/sq mi)
- Postcode: 4825
Suburbs around Fielding
Stokes	Claraville	Claraville
Stokes	Fielding	Claraville
Taldora	Savannah	East Creek

Fielding is a rural locality in the Shire of Carpentaria, Queensland, Australia. In the 2021 census, Fielding had "no people or a very low population".

== Geography ==
Geographically Fielding is part of the Gulf Country. The Norman River flows through the locality from the south-east (Savannah) to the north (Stokes/Claraville).

The land use is grazing on native vegetation.

== Demographics ==
In the 2016 census, Fielding had a population of 6 people.

In the 2021 census, Fielding had "no people or a very low population".

== Education ==
There are no schools in Fielding. The nearest government schools are Normanton State School (Prep to Year 10) in Normanton and Croydon State School (Prep to Year 6) in Croydon, but these schools would be too distant for most students in Fielding. Also, there are no schools providing Years 11 and 12 schooling in the area. The alternatives are distance education and boarding school.
