= Taldora, Queensland =

Taldora
- Suburb
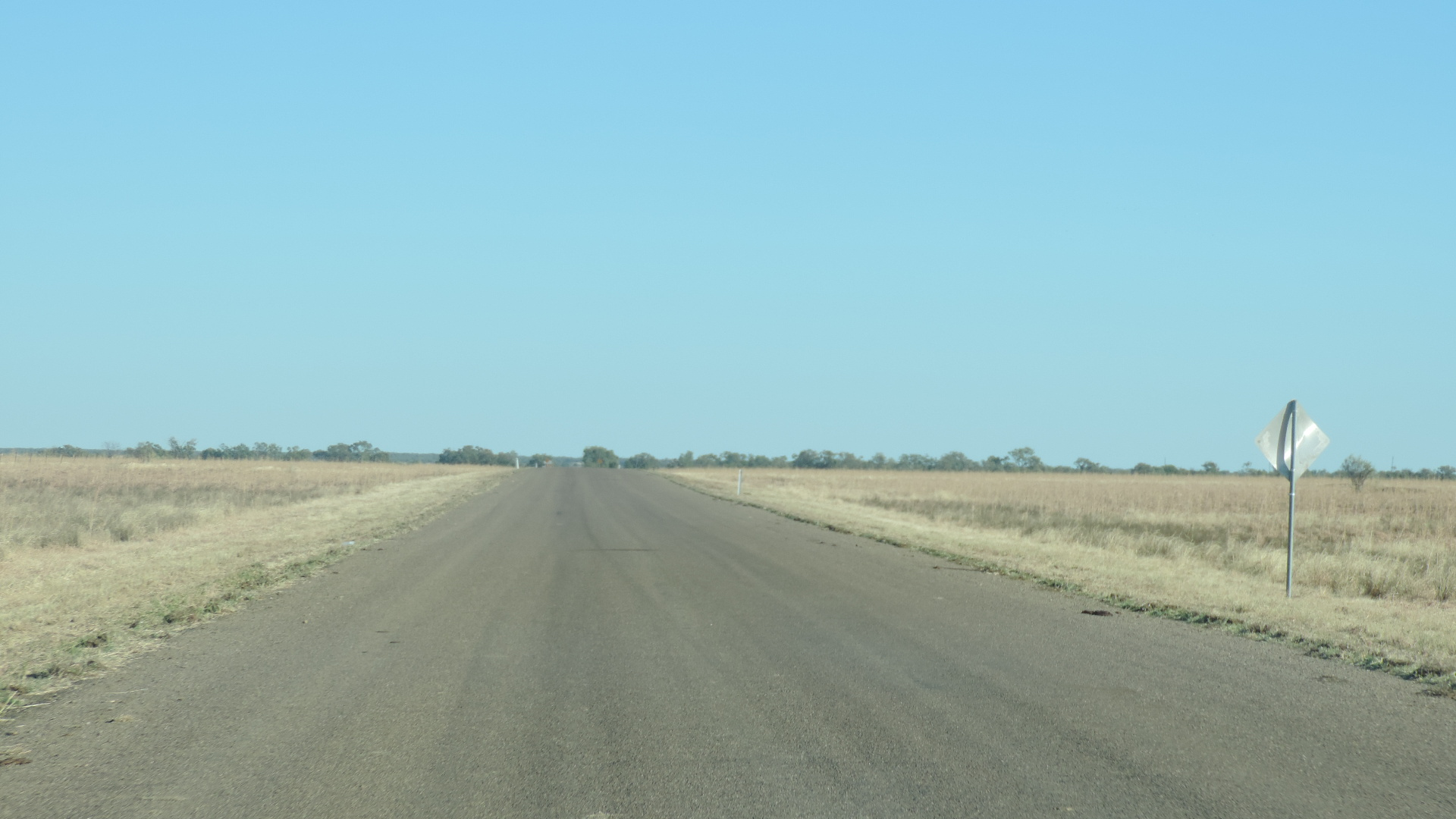
- Wills Developmental Road, Taldora, June 2019

- Interactive map of Taldora
- Coordinates: 19.8298°S 141.4234°E
- Country: Australia
- State: Queensland
- LGA: Shire of Mckinlay
- Location: 100 km (62 mi) NW of Julia Creek; 133 km (83 mi) NE of Cloncurry; 252 km (157 mi) ENE of Mount Isa; 747 km (464 mi) W of Townsville; 1,730 km (1,070 mi) NW of Brisbane

Government
  - State electorate: Traeger
  - Federal division: Kennedy

Area
  - Total: 13,197.3 km^{2} (5,095.5 sq mi)

Population
  - Total: 78 (2021 census)
  - Density: 0.00591/km^{2} (0.01531/sq mi)
- Time zone: UTC+10:00 (AEST)
- Postcode: 4823
Suburbs around Taldora
Stokes	Fielding	Savannah
Four Ways; Three Rivers	Taldora	Malpas-Trenton
Cloncurry	Julia Creek	Julia Creek

Taldora is an outback locality in the Shire of Mckinlay, Queensland, Australia. In the 2021 census, Taldora had a population of 78 people.

== Geography ==
The Wills Developmental Road enters the locality from the south (Julia Creek) and exits to the west (Four Ways).

There are a number of mountains in the locality:

- Mount Brown (19.7745°S 141.3946°E) 102 metres (335 ft)
- Mount Fort Bowen (19.6195°S 141.1600°E) 115 metres (377 ft)
- Mount Little (19.7859°S 141.4028°E) 104 metres (341 ft)

The locality is within the Carpentaria Coast drainage basin (also known as the Gulf Country) which ultimately flows into the Gulf of Carpentaria.

The Cloncurry River enters the locality from the south-west (Cloncurry) and exits to the west (Four Ways). The Flinders River enters the locality from the south-east (Malpas-Trenton) and traverses the north-western boundary of the locality with Four Ways before exiting to the north-west (Stokes). The Saxby River enters from the east (Malpas-Trenton) and exits to the north (Fielding).

The land use is grazing on native vegetation.

== History ==
Taldora was a cattle station from at least 1866. In 1878 a monthly mail service was established which passed through Taldora, and in 1880 it was referred to as a township. In July 1880 a new company purchased Taldora and began developing the station.

In 1900, Taldora was affected by a drought with rats infecting its water supply and a lack of rain resulting in no grass growing on the station and its waterhole drying up for the first time since 1880. In 1916 it was reported that Taldora was supporting 30,000 head of cattle which was three times the amount of Nockatunga Station which was the largest station in the state geographically.

In early 1947, Australian Aboriginal stockman Johnny Knight set out from Taldora to walk 150 miles to Normanton and went missing. A police search was launched which extended as far as Thursday Island and in July 1947 his swag was found and in July 1948 a skeleton which was found which may have been his remains. In 1953 an elderly man, Patrick Murphy, went missing while camping near Taldora where he was employed for ringbarking.

== Demographics ==
In the 2016 census, Taldora had a population of 37 people.

In the 2021 census, Taldora had a population of 78 people.

== Education ==
There are no schools in Taldora. The nearest government primary school is Julia Creek State School in neighbouring Julia Creek to the south; however, it would be too distant for a daily commute for most of the locality of Taldora. Also, there are no secondary schools nearby. The alternatives are distance education and boarding school.

== Economy ==
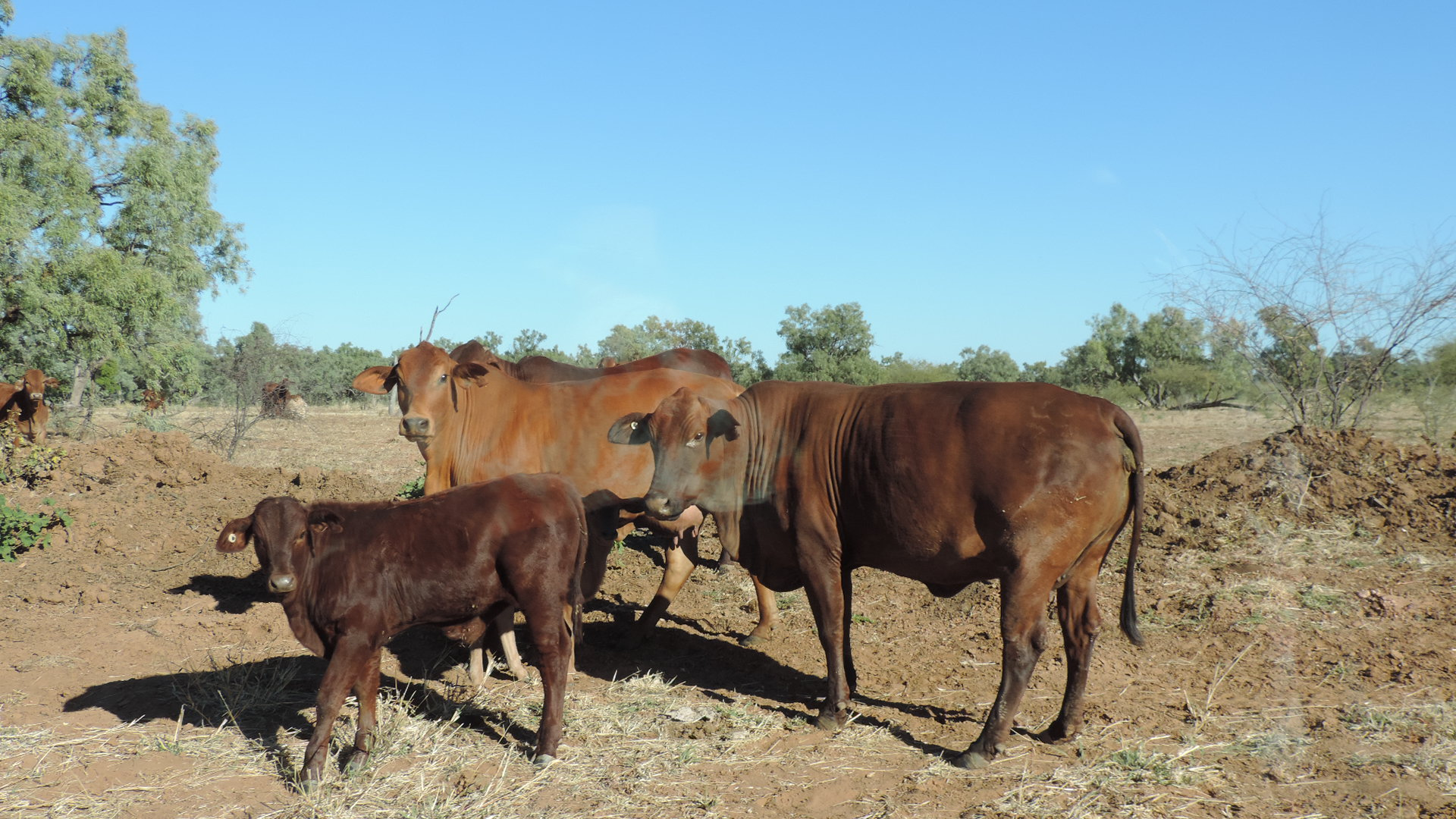
Cattle grazing, Taldora, 2019

There are a number of homesteads in the locality:

- Alva Downs (20.4198°S 141.6534°E)
- Arizona (19.5373°S 141.3544°E)
- Auckland Downs (20.2489°S 141.7716°E)
- Balootha (19.9305°S 141.3364°E)
- Baroona Downs (20.4831°S 141.6042°E)
- Bauhinia Downs (20.2502°S 141.7199°E)
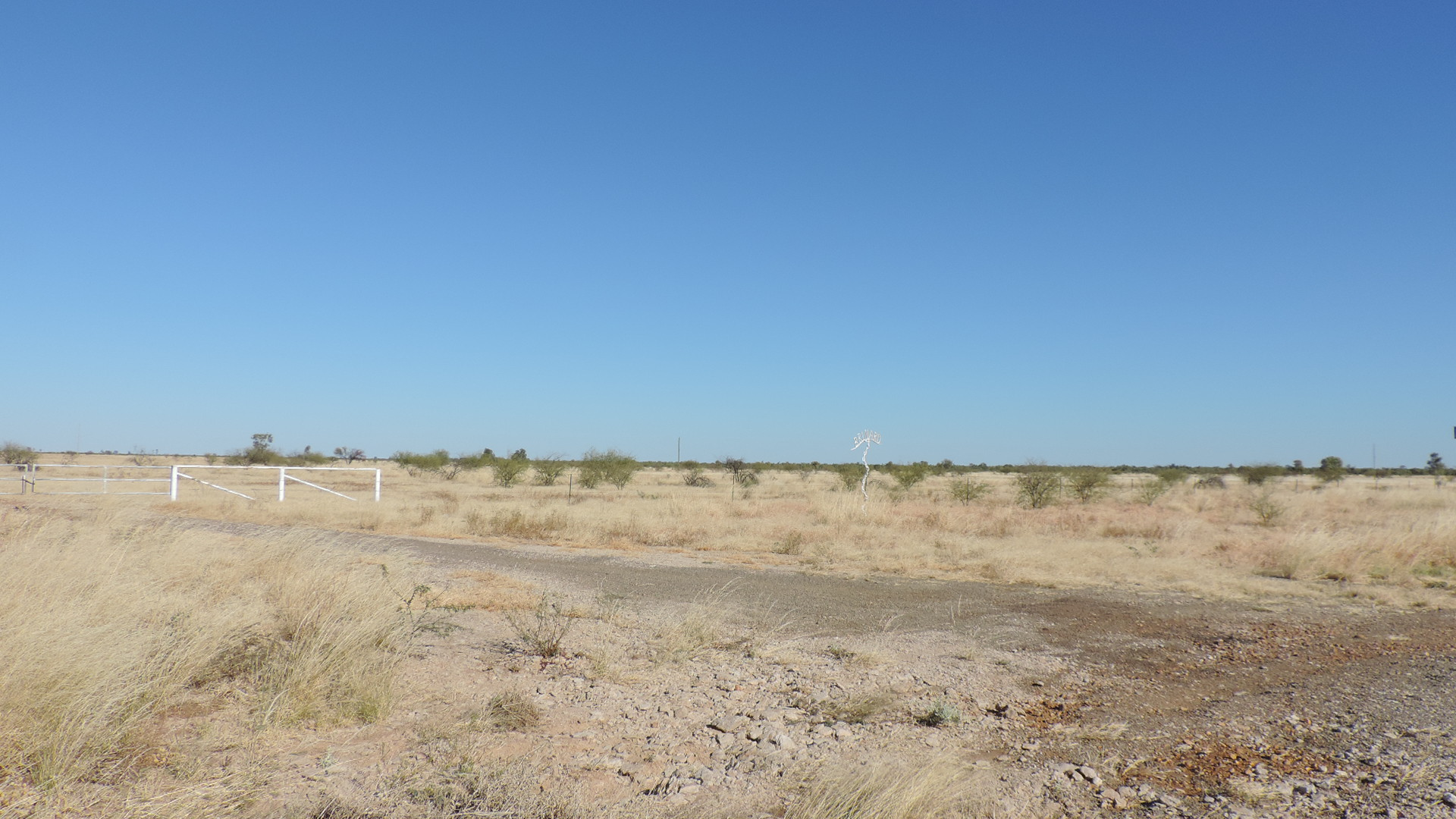
- Turn-off to Brinard Homestead from the Wills Developmental Road, June 2019
  Brinard (19.8397°S 140.9336°E)
- Byrimine (20.0582°S 140.9805°E)
- Caleewa Downs (20.3532°S 141.3821°E)
- Consentes (20.2630°S 141.6096°E)
- Cremona Downs (20.1922°S 141.4701°E)
- Dalgonally (20.1238°S 141.3185°E)
- Dora Vale (19.4642°S 141.2644°E)
- Etta Plains (19.8437°S 141.3056°E)
- Euroka Springs (19.8744°S 141.4846°E)
- Farm Camp (19.7184°S 141.7403°E)
- Flers (20.3401°S 141.5571°E)
- Haddington (20.0095°S 141.3883°E)
- Kalmeta (19.7762°S 140.9833°E)
- Keswick (20.4348°S 141.5449°E)
- Lands End (20.4272°S 141.4187°E)
- Lara Downs (20.1201°S 141.6125°E)
- Lyrian (19.4555°S 141.2062°E)
- Manfred Downs (20.2335°S 141.7195°E)
- Monstraven (19.6573°S 140.9547°E)
- Numil Downs (19.6666°S 141.3962°E)
- Ouchy (19.9076°S 140.9252°E)
- Sunny Plains (20.4500°S 141.7248°E)
- Taldora (19.3808°S 141.2920°E)
- Violet Vale (19.6906°S 140.9156°E)

Taldora Station consists of a ranch which is a private property with permission being required to visit. It does not have its own address with mail instead being received at Julia Creek.

== Transport ==
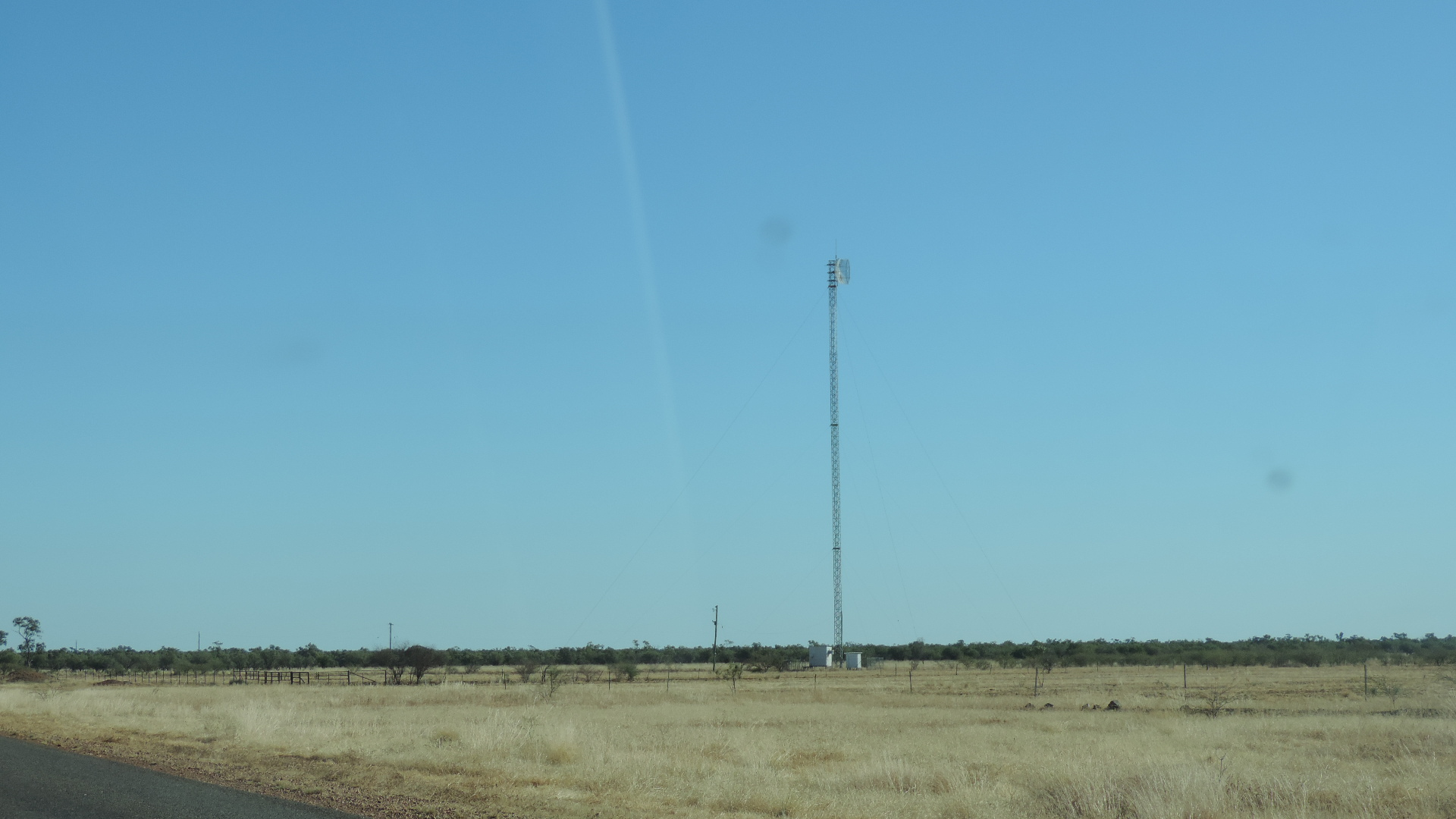
Communications mast off the Wills Developmental Road, 2019

There are a number of airstrips in the locality:

- Arizona Airstrip (19.5268°S 141.3545°E)
- Alcyone Airstrip (19.3746°S 141.2990°E)
- Dalgonally Airstrip (20.1225°S 141.3142°E)
- Lyrian Airstrip (19.4587°S 141.2037°E)
- Numil Downs Airstrip (19.6714°S 141.4039°E)
- Millungera Airstrip (20.1522°S 141.8475°E)
- Mullungera Airstrip (19.8575°S 141.5619°E)
- Wallacooloobie Airstrip (19.7776°S 140.9827°E)
- unnamed airstrip (20.0443°S 141.1074°E)
- unnamed airstrip (20.2304°S 141.7164°E)
- unnamed airstrip (19.8361°S 140.9348°E)
- unnamed airstrip (19.3454°S 141.3046°E)
- unnamed airstrip (19.6922°S 140.9137°E)
- unnamed airstrip (20.3313°S 141.5642°E)
- unnamed airstrip (19.3171°S 141.0153°E)
