= Bellfield, Queensland =

Bellfield
- Suburb
- Interactive map of Bellfield
- Coordinates: 19.3058°S 143.185°E
- Country: Australia
- State: Queensland
- LGA: Shire of Croydon
- Location: 178 km (111 mi) N of Richmond; 223 km (139 mi) SSE of Croydon; 525 km (326 mi) NE of Mount Isa; 685 km (426 mi) W of Townsville; 1,771 km (1,100 mi) NNW of Brisbane

Government
  - State electorate: Traeger
  - Federal division: Kennedy

Area
  - Total: 3,173.8 km^{2} (1,225.4 sq mi)

Population
  - Total: 10 (2021 census)
  - Density: 0.0032/km^{2} (0.008/sq mi)
- Time zone: UTC+10:00 (AEST)
- Postcode: 4822
Suburbs around Bellfield
Esmeralda	Esmeralda	Northhead
Victoria Vale	Bellfield	Gilberton
Saxby	Woolgar	Woolgar

Bellfield is a rural locality in the Shire of Croydon, Queensland, Australia. In the 2021 census, Bellfield had "no people or a very low population".

== Geography ==
The Norman River rises in the east of the locality and flows west through the locality before forming a small section of the south-western boundary and then exiting to Victoria Vale to the west. The river untilimately flows into the Gulf of Carpentaria.

The Clara River rises in the north-east of the locality and flows west, forming part of the western boundary of the locality, before exiting to Victoria Vale to the west. It becomes a tributary of the Norman River in Claraville to the north-west.

The Richmond–Croydon Road passes twice through the south-west of the locality. It enters the locality from the west (Victoria Vale), then returns to Victoria Vale, then re-enters the locality, exiting finally to the south (Woolgar).

The land use is grazing on native vegetation.

== Demographics ==
In the 2016 census, Bellfield had "no people or a very low population".

In the 2021 census, Bellfield had "no people or a very low population".

== Education ==
There are no schools in Bellfield, nor nearby. The options are distance education and boarding school.
