= Richmond–Croydon Road =

Road in Queensland, Australia

Richmond–Croydon Road Queensland

General information
- Type: Rural road
- Length: 360 km (224 mi)
- Route number(s): no shield

Major junctions
- South end: Flinders Highway Richmond
- North end: Gulf Developmental Road Croydon

Richmond–Croydon Road is a continuous 360 kilometres (220 mi) road route in the Richmond, Croydon and Etheridge local government areas of Queensland, Australia. It is part of the shortest route from the Croydon / Georgetown area to Winton and Longreach. It is also part of the inland freight network linking cattle properties to major freight routes on the Landsborough and Flinders highways.

== Route description ==
The Richmond–Croydon Road commences at an intersection with the Flinders Highway in Richmond. It starts as Goldring Street, running generally north-west through the locality of Richmond. It passes the Richmond Airport and crosses the Flinders River soon after leaving the town. It then runs through Burleigh from south to west, crossing the Woolgar River (a tributary of the Flinders) and turning north to follow the boundary between Burleigh and Cambridge. It continues north, following the boundary between Burleigh and Saxby. In Saxby it runs north and then north-east, leaving Saxby and crossing the north-west corner of Woolgar.

It enters Bellfield and turns north, crossing the Norman River and an eastern section of Victoria Vale, re-entering Bellfield and turning west. It re-enters Victoria Vale and turns north-west. It then enters Esmeralda and continues generally north until it reaches the northern boundary. Crossing the boundary it enters Gilbert River, where it continues mainly north-west. Reaching the western boundary it loosely follows it until it reaches the Gulf Developmental Road, where it ends at a T-junction. This intersection is about 27 kilometres (17 mi) east of Croydon, on the Croydon / Gilbert River mid-point.

The section within Gilbert River is in the Etheridge local government area.

Land use along this road is mainly stock grazing on native vegetation. There are no major intersections on this road.

== Road names ==
Various sections of the road are known as Richmond–Woolgar Road, Richmond Road, and Croydon Road. Not all mapping systems use the same names for the sections. The name "Richmond–Croydon Road" is used in this article as the most definitive for the entire road.

== Road condition ==
Much of the road remains unsealed, but approximately 15 kilometres (9.3 mi) was sealed in 2018–19 under an $5.2 million project funded by the Northern Australia Beef Roads Program. As at April 2022 the road has approximately 150 kilometres (93 mi) single lane sealed, split into sections, and approximately 229 kilometres (142 mi) single lane unsealed.

Note that the sum of the distances given in this reference is greater than the distance calculated by Google maps. It is assumed that it includes the distance from the northern end of the road to Croydon.

== History ==
Richmond Downs pastoral run was established in 1864. Gold was discovered at Woolgar, just north of Richmond, in 1880, and Richmond became a stagecoach stop for prospectors on the way to Woolgar. The town was surveyed in 1882, and the railway arrived in 1904. The town became the administrative centre for the district. There are many large properties (cattle stations) to the north of Richmond, including Middle Park (in Woolgar), Kalda and Etheldale (in Saxby), and Walker Park (in Burleigh).

Croydon pastoral run was established in the 1880s. Gold was discovered in 1885, and by 1887 the town had a population of 7,000. The railway from Normanton arrived in 1891. The town was surrounded by other cattle stations, and became the administrative centre for the district, serving both the miners and the cattle stations.

Early roads were cut from both Richmond and Croydon to provide access for wheeled vehicles to the pastoral runs and other settlements. Over time these tracks were improved and extended to eventually form a through road.

== Modern usage ==
Although not yet fully sealed the road is used extensively by road trains carrying cattle, and by other large trucks conveying heavy goods. The road is described in a Queensland Government regional map as the "Cattle Corridor Byway".
