= Savannah, Queensland =

Savannah
- Suburb
- Interactive map of Savannah
- Coordinates: 19.2157°S 141.8789°E
- Country: Australia
- State: Queensland
- LGA: Shire of Carpentaria
- Location: 263 km (163 mi) SSW of Croydon; 281 km (175 mi) SSE of Normanton; 477 km (296 mi) NE of Mount Isa; 734 km (456 mi) SW of Cairns; 1,848 km (1,148 mi) NW of Brisbane

Government
  - State electorate: Traeger
  - Federal division: Kennedy

Area
  - Total: 3,956.6 km^{2} (1,527.7 sq mi)

Population
  - Total: 0 (2021 census)
  - Density: 0.00000/km^{2} (0.0000/sq mi)
- Postcode: 4816
Suburbs around Savannah
| Fielding | East Creek; Claraville | Esmeralda |
| Fielding | Savannah | Victoria Vale |
| Taldora | Malpas-Trenton | Malpas-Trenton |

Savannah is a rural locality in the Shire of Carpentaria, Queensland, Australia. In the 2021 census, Savannah had "no people or a very low population".

== Geography ==
Savannah is part of the Gulf Country. The Norman River flows through the locality from the west (Victoria Vale) to the north-east (Fielding).

== Demographics ==
In the 2016 census, Savannah had "no people or a very low population".

In the 2021 census, Savannah had "no people or a very low population".

== Education ==
There are no schools in the locality nor nearby. The alternatives are distance education and boarding school.
