= East Creek, Queensland =

East Creek
- Suburb
- Interactive map of East Creek
- Coordinates: 19.0991°S 141.6955°E
- Country: Australia
- State: Queensland
- LGA: Shire of Croydon
- Location: 112 km (70 mi) SW of Croydon; 173 km (107 mi) SSE of Normanton; 297 km (185 mi) NW of Mount Isa; 528 km (328 mi) W of Townsville; 1,486 km (923 mi) NW of Brisbane

Government
  - State electorate: Traeger
  - Federal division: Kennedy

Area
  - Total: 377.2 km^{2} (145.6 sq mi)

Population
  - Total: 0 (2021 census)
  - Density: 0.0000/km^{2} (0.000/sq mi)
- Time zone: UTC+10:00 (AEST)
- Postcode: 4871
Suburbs around East Creek
Fielding	Claraville	Savannah
Savannah	East Creek	Savannah
Savannah	Savannah	Savannah

East Creek is a rural locality in the Shire of Croydon, Queensland, Australia. In the 2021 census, East Creek had "no people or a very low population".

== Geography ==
The Norman River forms the southern boundary of the locality, flowing north-west towards the Gulf of Carpentaria.

The land use is grazing on native vegetation. There are two pastoral properties in the locality:

- Mundjuro in the west of the locality
- Lucksome in the north-east of the locality

== Demographics ==
In the 2016 census, East Creek had "no people or a very low population".

In the 2021 census, East Creek had "no people or a very low population".

== Education ==
There are no schools in East Creek, nor nearby. Distance education and boarding school are the alternatives.
