= Coralie, Queensland =

Coralie
- Suburb
- Interactive map of Coralie
- Coordinates: 18.1680°S 141.8138°E
- Country: Australia
- State: Queensland
- LGA: Shire of Croydon
- Location: 61.3 km (38.1 mi) W of Croydon; 134 km (83 mi) SE of Normanton; 585 km (364 mi) WSW of Cairns; 619 km (385 mi) NE of Mount Isa; 2,016 km (1,253 mi) NNW of Brisbane

Government
  - State electorate: Traeger
  - Federal division: Kennedy

Area
  - Total: 1,035.6 km^{2} (399.8 sq mi)

Population
  - Total: 0 (2021 census)
  - Density: 0.0000/km^{2} (0.0000/sq mi)
- Time zone: UTC+10:00 (AEST)
- Postcode: 4871
Suburbs around Coralie
Claraville	Blackbull	Croydon
Claraville	Coralie	Croydon
Claraville	Claraville	Croydon

Coralie is an outback locality in the Shire of Croydon, Queensland, Australia. In the 2021 census, Coralie had "no people or a very low population".

== Geography ==
The land use is grazing on native vegetation with three pastoral properties in the locality:

- Ellavale (18.1532°S 141.9897°E)
- Florence (18.2891°S 141.7463°E)
- Guildford (18.2121°S 141.8917°E)

== Demographics ==
In the 2016 census, Coralie had "no people or a very low population".

In the 2021 census, Coralie had "no people or a very low population".

== Education ==
There are no schools in Coralie. The nearest government primary school is Croydon State School in neighbouring Croydon to the east, but this school would be too distant for students living in the west of Coralie. Also, there are no nearby secondary schools. The alternatives are distance education and boarding school.
