= Esmeralda, Queensland =

Esmeralda
- Suburb
- Interactive map of Esmeralda
- Coordinates: 18.8630°S 142.6619°E
- Country: Australia
- State: Queensland
- LGA: Shire of Croydon
- Location: 105 km (65 mi) SSE of Croydon; 260 km (160 mi) SE of Normanton; 576 km (358 mi) SW of Cairns; 1,867 km (1,160 mi) NW of Brisbane

Government
  - State electorate: Traeger
  - Federal division: Kennedy

Area
  - Total: 5,212.4 km^{2} (2,012.5 sq mi)

Population
  - Total: 0 (2021 census)
  - Density: 0.00000/km^{2} (0.00000/sq mi)
- Time zone: UTC+10:00 (AEST)
- Postcode: 4871
Suburbs around Esmeralda
Croydon	Croydon	Gilbert River
Claraville	Esmeralda	Northhead
Savannah	Victoria Vale	Bellfield

Esmeralda is a rural locality in the Shire of Croydon, Queensland, Australia. In the 2021 census, Esmeralda had "no people or a very low population".

== Geography ==
The Richmond–Croydon Road runs through from south to north.

The land use is grazing on native vegetation.

== History ==
The locality takes its name from a local hill named on 30 September 1873 by explorer George Elphinstone Dalrymple.

== Demographics ==
In the 2016 census, Esmeralda had a population of 21 people.

In the 2021 census, Esmeralda had "no people or a very low population".

== Education ==
There are no schools in Esmeralda nor nearby. The options are distance education and boarding school.

== Economy ==
There are a number of homesteads in the locality:

- Esmeralda (18.8529°S 142.5736°E)
- Glenora (18.9953°S 142.9709°E)
- Idalia (18.4560°S 142.5689°E)
