= Burleigh, Queensland =

Burleigh
- Suburb
- Interactive map of Burleigh
- Coordinates: 20.2938°S 143.0544°E
- Country: Australia
- State: Queensland
- LGA: Shire of Richmond
- Location: 62.1 km (38.6 mi) N of Richmond; 176 km (109 mi) NW of Hughenden; 560 km (350 mi) WSW of Townsville; 1,646 km (1,023 mi) NW of Brisbane

Government
  - State electorate: Traeger
  - Federal division: Kennedy

Area
  - Total: 3,613.3 km^{2} (1,395.1 sq mi)

Population
  - Total: 52 (2021 census)
  - Density: 0.01439/km^{2} (0.0373/sq mi)
- Time zone: UTC+10:00 (AEST)
- Postcode: 4822
Suburbs around Burleigh
Saxby	Woolgar	Woolgar
Cambridge	Burleigh	Woolgar
Cambridge	Maxwelton	Richmond

Burleigh is a rural locality in the Shire of Richmond, Queensland, Australia. In the 2021 census, Burleigh had a population of 52 people.

== Geography ==
The Flinders River forms the southern boundary of the locality.

The Richmond–Croydon Road runs through from south to north-west.

The land use is predominantly cattle grazing.

== Demographics ==
In the 2016 census, Burleigh had a population of 44 people.

In the 2021 census, Burleigh had a population of 52 people.

== Education ==
There are no schools in Burleigh. The nearest government school is Richmond State School (Prep - Year 10) in neighbouring Richmond to the south-east; however, students in the north of Burleigh would be too distant for a daily commute. Also, there are no nearby schools offerering secondary schooling to Year 12. The alternatives are distance education and boarding school.
