= Victoria Vale, Queensland =

Victoria Vale
- Suburb
- Interactive map of Victoria Vale
- Coordinates: 19.4012°S 142.6928°E
- Country: Australia
- State: Queensland
- LGA: Shire of Croydon
- Location: 177 km (110 mi) S of Croydon; 214 km (133 mi) N of Richmond; 479 km (298 mi) ENE of Mount Isa; 712 km (442 mi) W of Townsville; 1,798 km (1,117 mi) NW of Brisbane

Government
  - State electorate: Traeger
  - Federal division: Kennedy

Area
  - Total: 2,383.8 km^{2} (920.4 sq mi)

Population
  - Total: 12 (2021 census)
  - Density: 0.00503/km^{2} (0.0130/sq mi)
- Time zone: UTC+10:00 (AEST)
- Postcode: 4822
Suburbs around Victoria Vale
Savannah	Esmeralda	Esmeralda
Malpas-Trenton	Victoria Vale	Bellfield
Saxby	Saxby	Saxby

Victoria Vale is a rural locality in the Shire of Croydon, Queensland, Australia. In the 2021 census, Victoria Vale had a population of 12 people.

== Geography ==
The Norman River forms part of the south-eastern boundary before flowing through to the west. The Clara River, a tributary of the Norman River, flows through from north-east to north.

The Richmond–Croydon Road crosses the south-eastern and north-eastern corners.

The land use is grazing on native vegetation.

== Demographics ==
In the 2016 census, Victoria Vale had "no people or a very low population".

In the 2021 census, Victoria Vale had a population of 12 people.

== Education ==
There are no schools in Victoria Vale, nor nearby. The alternatives are distance education and boarding school.
