= Cambridge, Queensland =

Cambridge
- Suburb
- Interactive map of Cambridge
- Coordinates: 20.3679°S 142.5853°E
- Country: Australia
- State: Queensland
- LGA: Shire of Richmond
- Location: 95.0 km (59.0 mi) NW of Richmond; 209 km (130 mi) WNW of Hughenden; 594 km (369 mi) WSW of Townsville; 1,679 km (1,043 mi) NW of Brisbane

Government
  - State electorate: Traeger
  - Federal division: Kennedy

Area
  - Total: 2,764.8 km^{2} (1,067.5 sq mi)

Population
  - Total: 0 (2021 census)
  - Density: 0.00000/km^{2} (0.0000/sq mi)
- Postcode: 4822
Suburbs around Cambridge
Malpas-Trenton	Saxby	Burleigh
Malpas-Trenton	Cambridge	Burleigh
Maxwelton	Maxwelton	Burleigh

Cambridge is a rural locality in the Shire of Richmond, Queensland, Australia. In the 2021 census, Cambridge had "no people or a very low population".

== Geography ==
The Flinders River forms the southern boundary of the locality and Express Creek forms the eastern part of the northern boundary.

The Richmond–Croydon Road runs along the north-eastern boundary.

The land use is predominantly grazing on native vegetation.

== Demographics ==
In the 2016 census, Cambridge had a population of 42 people.

In the 2021 census, Cambridge had "no people or a very low population".

== Education ==
There are no schools in Cambridge, nor nearby. The alternatives are distance education and boarding school.
