= Blackbull, Queensland =

Blackbull
- Suburb
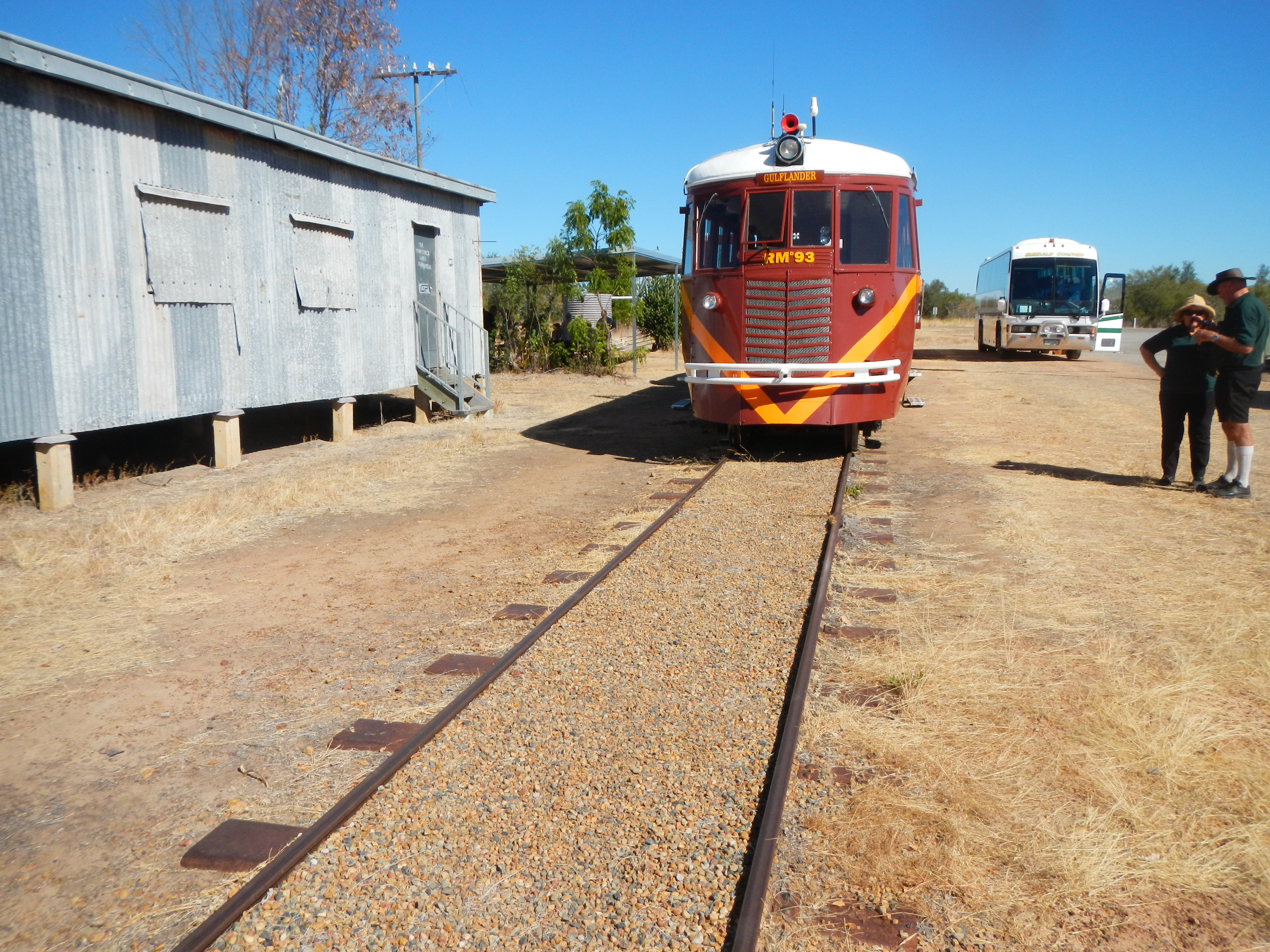
- The Gulflander stopped at Blackbull siding, 2013

- Interactive map of Blackbull
- Coordinates: 17.8057°S 141.7447°E
- Country: Australia
- State: Queensland
- LGA: Shire of Croydon
- Location: 61.3 km (38.1 mi) NW of Croydon; 93 km (58 mi) ESE of Normanton; 578 km (359 mi) NNE of Mount Isa; 585 km (364 mi) W of Cairns; 2,016 km (1,253 mi) NNW of Brisbane

Government
  - State electorate: Traeger
  - Federal division: Kennedy

Area
  - Total: 3,287.9 km^{2} (1,269.5 sq mi)

Population
  - Total: 0 (2021 census)
  - Density: 0.00000/km^{2} (0.0000/sq mi)
- Time zone: UTC+10:00 (AEST)
- Postcode: 4871
Suburbs around Blackbull
Karron	Karron	Karron
Normanton	Blackbull	Croydon
Claraville	Claraville	Coralie

Blackbull is a rural locality in the Shire of Croydon, Queensland, Australia. In the 2021 census, Blackbull had "no people or a very low population".

== Geography ==
The Gulf Developmental Road passes through the locality from the south-east to the south-west. The Normanton to Croydon railway line runs immediately parallel to it with the locality being served by the Blackbull railway siding. The only service that operates on the railway line is the weekly Gulflander, which operates as a tourist attraction and includes a morning tea stop at the Blackbull railway siding.

The Carron River "flows" through the locality from south-east to north-west, although in the dry season it is just a string of waterholes. It is a tributary of the Norman River which flows into the Gulf of Carpentaria.

== History ==
The locality takes its name from the Blackbull railway siding on Normanton to Croydon railway line. The railway siding was originally called Pattersons siding, but was renamed in 1891, reportedly after a black bull found during mustering by William and Joseph Taaffe.

== Demographics ==
In the 2016 census Blackbull had "no people or a very low population".

In the 2021 census, Blackbull had "no people or a very low population".

== Education ==
There are no schools in Blackbull. Students living in the north-west of the locality can attend Normanton State School (Prep to Year 10) in neighbouring Normanton to the west. Students in the south-east of the locality can attend Croydon State School (Early Childhood to Year 6) in neighbouring Croydon to the east. For other students in other part of Blackbull or needing education beyond what is available at local schools, the alternatives are distance education and boarding school.
