= Gilbert River, Queensland =

Gilbert River
- Suburb
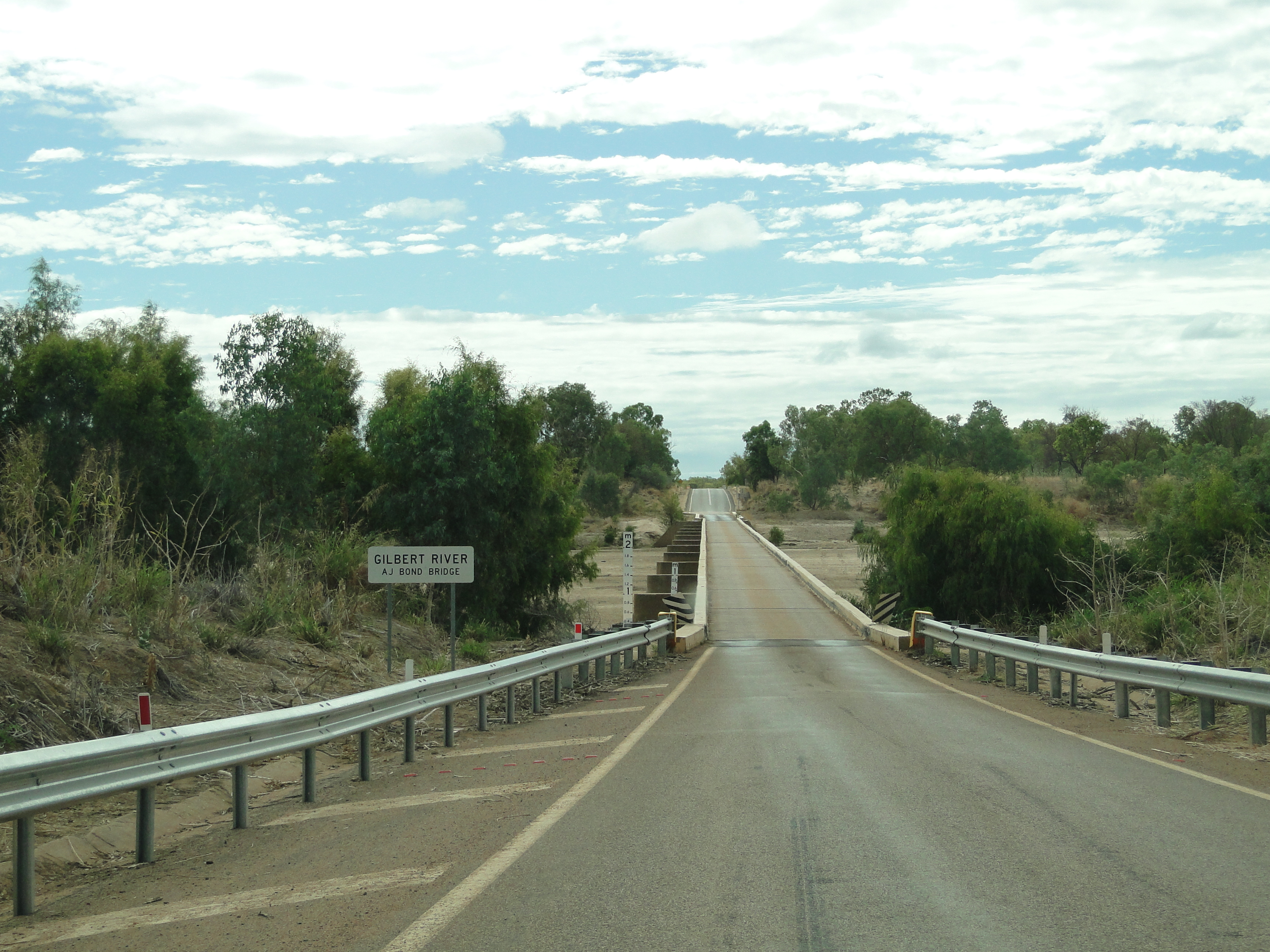
- National Route 1 crosses the Gilbert River, 2014

- Interactive map of Gilbert River
- Coordinates: 18.2559°S 142.7530°E
- Country: Australia
- State: Queensland
- LGA: Shire of Etheridge
- Location: 52.2 km (32.4 mi) E of Croydon; 100 km (62 mi) W of Georgetown; 476 km (296 mi) WSW of Cairns; 1,909 km (1,186 mi) NNW of Brisbane

Government
  - State electorate: Traeger
  - Federal division: Kennedy

Area
  - Total: 2,385.4 km^{2} (921.0 sq mi)

Population
  - Total: 32 (2021 census)
  - Density: 0.01341/km^{2} (0.0347/sq mi)
- Time zone: UTC+10:00 (AEST)
- Postcode: 4871
Suburbs around Gilbert River
Croydon	Strathmore	Strathmore
Croydon	Gilbert River	Georgetown
Esmeralda	Northhead	Georgetown

Gilbert River is an outback rural locality in the Shire of Etheridge, Queensland, Australia. In the 2021 census, Gilbert River had a population of 32 people.

== Geography ==
The locality is roughly bounded to the south by the Gregory Range (18.4876°S 142.6433°E) which extends into neighbouring Croydon, Esmeralda and Northhead and beyond.

Gilbert River has the following mountains:

- Brennans Knob in the south-west of the locality (18.4330°S 142.5956°E) at 302 metres (991 ft) above sea level
- Mount Little in the centre of the locality (18.3257°S 142.7475°E) at 220 metres (720 ft) above sea level

The Gilbert River from which the locality derives its name enters the locality from the east (Georgetown) and exits to the north (Strathmore), ultimately flowing into the Gulf of Carpentaria to the north.

The Gulf Developmental Road (part of National Route 1) enters the locality from the east (Georgetown), crosses the Gilbert River on A. J. Bond Bridge (18.19902°S 142.87535°E), and exits to the west (Croydon). The Richmond–Croydon Road (known locally as Richmond Road) enters the locality from the south-west (Esmeralda) and exits to the west (Croydon).

The western part of the locality is a protected area being within the Littleton National Park and the Littleton Resources Reserve. The remainder of the land is used for grazing on native vegetation with a small amount of pasture around the Gilbert River.

== History ==
Jangga, also known as Yangga, is a language of Central Queensland. The Jangga language region includes the landscape within the local government boundaries of the Etheridge Shire Council.

The locality takes its name from the Gilbert River which flows through the locality.

Gilbert River Provisional School opened on 8 May 1899. On 1 January 1909 it became Gilbert River State School. It closed in 1923. It reopened in 1954 and then closed in 1961.

== Demographics ==
In the 2016 census, Gilbert River had a population of 38 people.

In the 2021 census, Gilbert River had a population of 32 people.

== Economy ==
There are a number of homesteads in the locality, including:

- Chadshunt (18.1335°S 142.8518°E)
- Inorunie (18.2090°S 142.6575°E)
- Lake Calo (18.1143°S 142.7916°E)
- Rockfields (18.1906°S 142.8744°E)

== Education ==
There are no schools in Gilbert River. The nearest government secondary school is Croydon State School in neighbouring Croydon to the west, but it would be too distant for a daily commute for students living in the eastern parts of Gilbert River. Also, there are no secondary schools nearby. The alternatives are distance education and boarding school.

== Transport ==
Littleton Airstrip (also known as Inorunie) is an airstrip just inside the national park and immediately south of the Inorunie homestead (18.2137°S 142.6554°E).
