= Stokes, Queensland =

Stokes
- Suburb
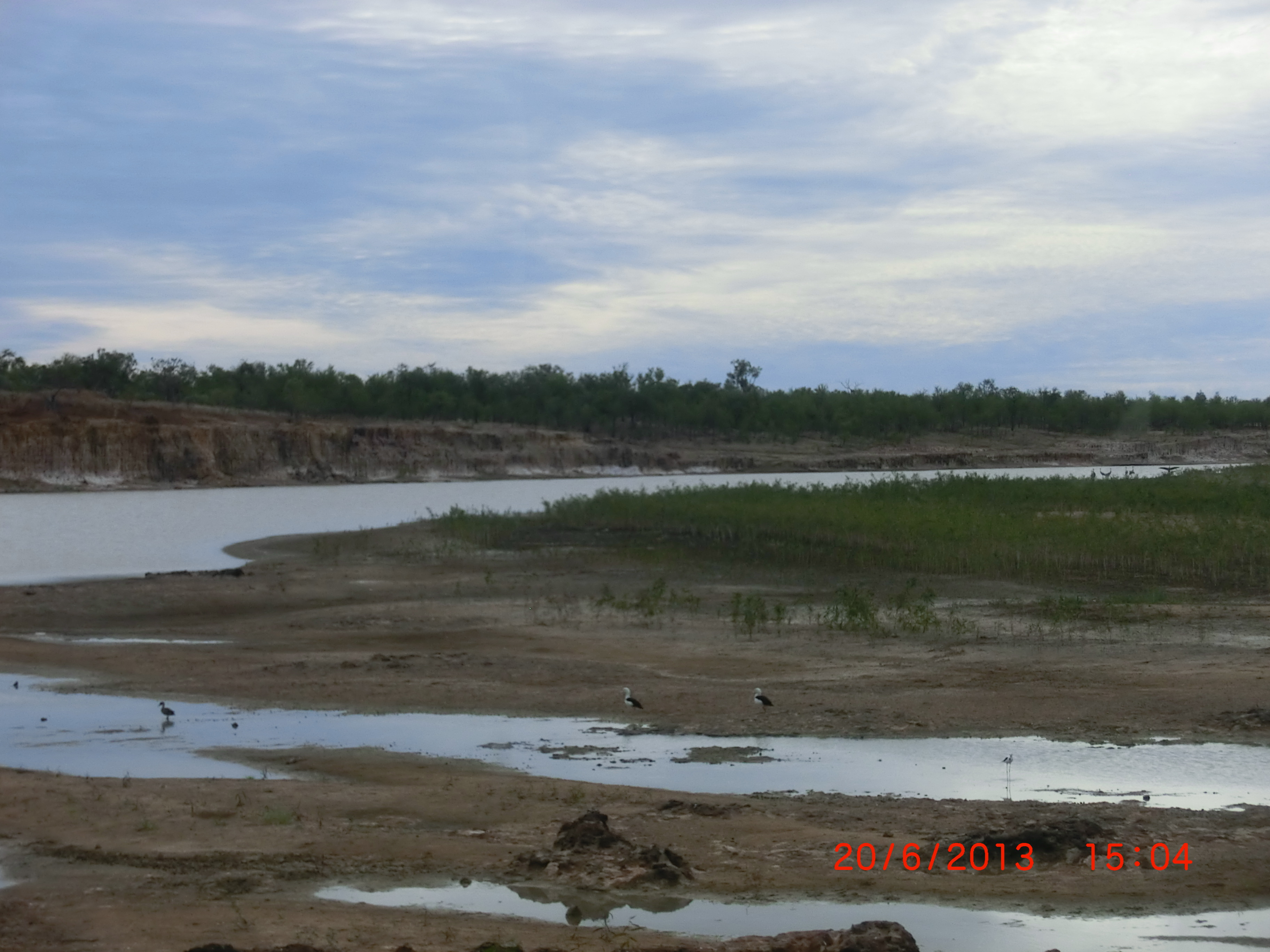
- Alexandra River, at Stokes, 2013

- Interactive map of Stokes
- Coordinates: 18.6741°S 140.5019°E
- Country: Australia
- State: Queensland
- LGA: Shire of Carpentaria
- Location: 113 km (70 mi) SSW of Normanton; 418 km (260 mi) NNE of Mount Isa; 969 km (602 mi) WNW of Townsville; 2,007 km (1,247 mi) NW of Brisbane

Government
  - State electorate: Traeger
  - Federal division: Kennedy

Area
  - Total: 11,715.0 km^{2} (4,523.2 sq mi)

Population
  - Total: 75 (2021 census)
  - Density: 0.00640/km^{2} (0.01658/sq mi)
- Time zone: UTC+10:00 (AEST)
- Postcode: 4823
Suburbs around Stokes
| Carpentaria | Normanton | Claraville |
| Gregory | Stokes | Fielding |
| Gidya | Four Ways | Taldora |

Stokes is an outback locality in the Shire of Carpentaria, Queensland, Australia. In the 2021 census, Stokes had a population of 75 people.

== Geography ==
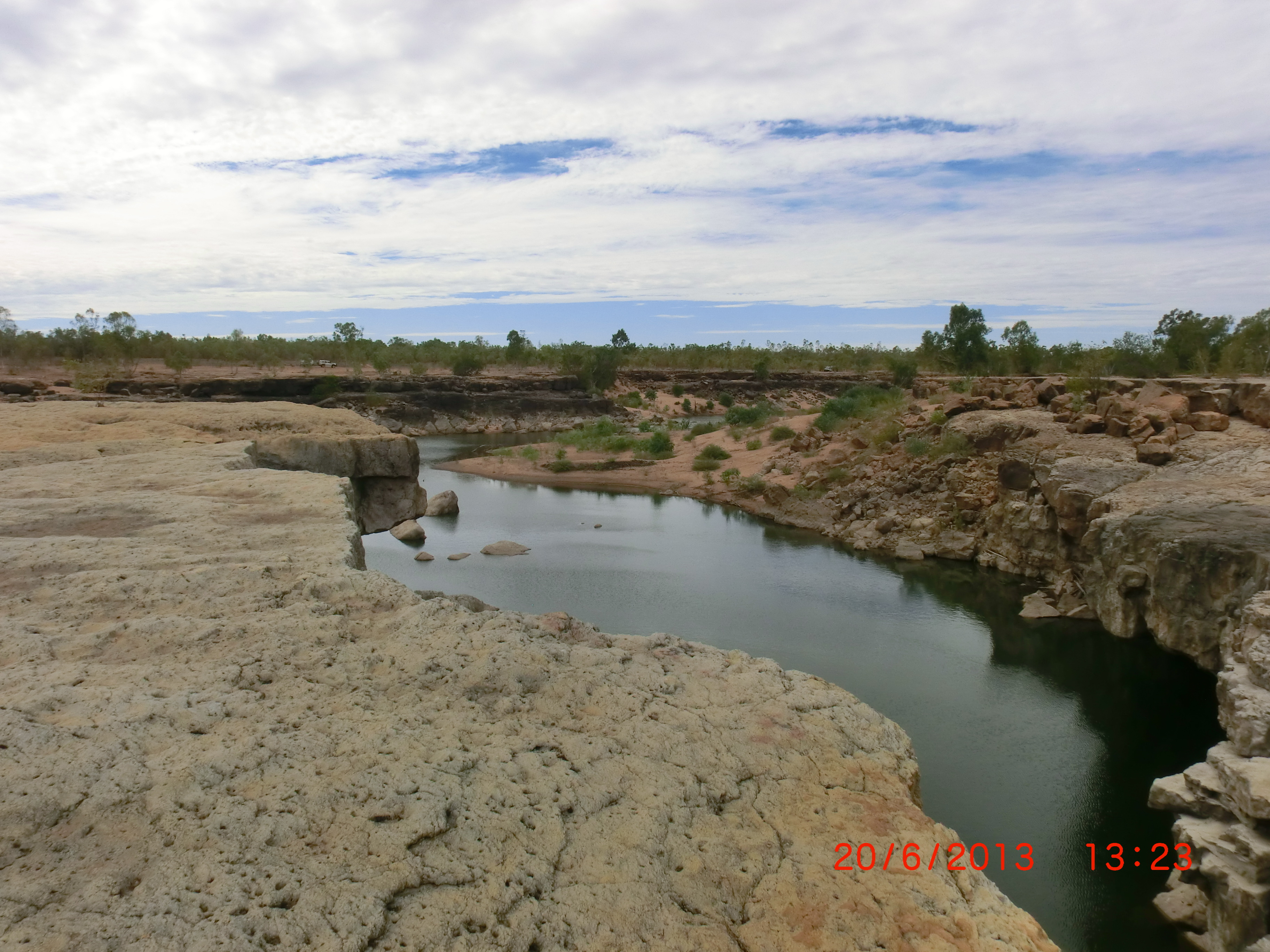
Leichhart River at Stokes, 2013

The Leichhardt River forms the western boundary of the locality. Together with the Alexandra River, the Cloncurry River, the Flinders River and the Saxby River and numerous creeks, they all flow from south to north through the locality. The Alexandra River becomes a tributary of the Leichhardt River at the north-western point of the locality and the Cloncurry River and Saxby Rivers both become tributaries of the Flinders River in the north-east of the locality, leaving only the Leichhardt and Flinders Rivers to continue to flow into the Gulf of Carpentaria to the north.

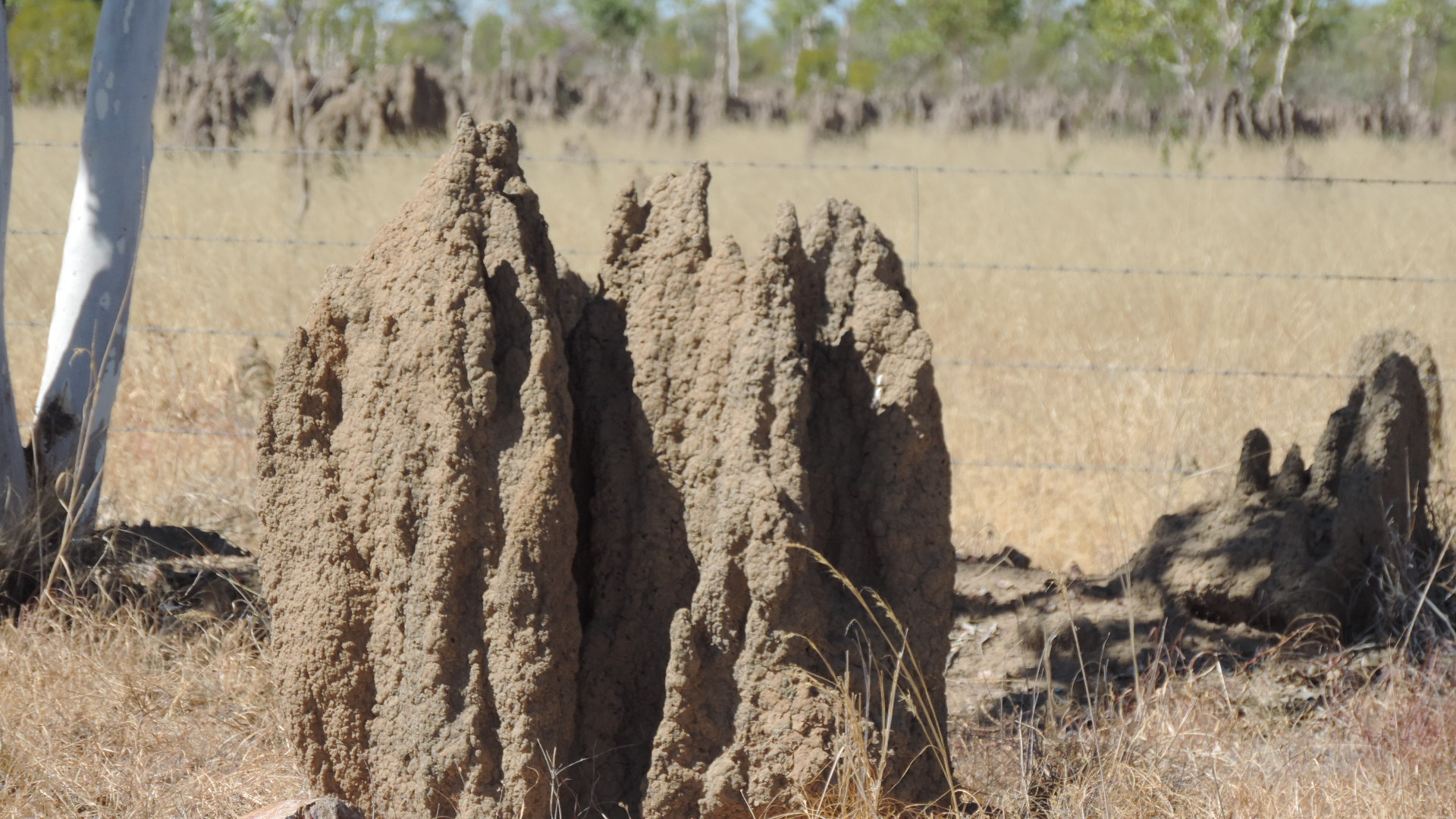
Termite mounds along the Burke Developmental Road, 2019

The Burke Developmental Road passes through the locality from north-east to south. The Wills Developmental Road passes through the south-west of the locality. The roads intersect at the neighbouring locality of Four Ways to the south. The land is entirely used for pastoral leases and is mostly flat at approximately 50 metres above sea level.

The flatness of the land gives emphasis to a hill locally known as Bang Bang Jump Up on the Burke Developmental Road as it is the only sudden change in elevation within a very long distance and is of interest to tourists both as a lookout over the surrounding countryside and because they find the name amusing.

== History ==
The locality is named after John Lort Stokes, who was commanding officer of HMS Beagle from 1841 to 1846.

== Demographics ==
In the 2016 census, Stokes had a population of 84 people.

In the 2021 census, Stokes had a population of 75 people.

== Education ==
There are no schools in Stokes nor nearby. The options are distance education and boarding school.
