= Karron, Queensland =

Karron
- Suburb
- Interactive map of Karron
- Coordinates: 17.5709°S 141.7919°E
- Country: Australia
- State: Queensland
- LGA: Shire of Croydon

Government
  - State electorate: Traeger
  - Federal division: Kennedy

Area
  - Total: 2,452.5 km^{2} (946.9 sq mi)

Population
  - Total: 0 (2021 census)
  - Density: 0.00000/km^{2} (0.0000/sq mi)
- Postcode: 4871
Suburbs around Karron
Howitt	Howitt	Howitt
Normanton	Karron	Croydon
Blackbull	Blackbull	Blackbull

Karron is an outback locality in the Shire of Croydon, Queensland, Australia. In the 2021 census, Karron had "no people or a very low population".

== Geography ==
Karron is in the Gulf Country in Far North Queensland. A number of creeks including Walker Creek, Fish Hole Creek, Wills Creek, and Rocky Creek, flow from west to east through the locality. These creeks all become tributaries of the Norman River which enters the Gulf of Carpentaria at Karumba.

There are no public roads in the locality.

The principal land use is cattle grazing. There are three large pastoral stations which occupy Karron:

- Mutton Hole pastoral station (665 square kilometres (257 sq mi) in the west of the locality
- Clotilda pastoral station (646 square kilometres (249 sq mi)) in the south-east
- Miranda Downs pastoral station (4,380 square kilometres (1,690 sq mi)) in the north-east extending into neighbouring Howitt.

== History ==
The locality presumably takes its name from the Karron pastoral station, which is not within the locality's boundaries but is immediately adjacent in neighbouring Blackbull. The pastoral station probably takes its name from the Carron River which flows through the property. The river in turn is named after William Carron who was second in command of the Edmund Kennedy expedition in 1848. Carron was the expedition botanist and one of the three survivors of the venture.

== Demographics ==
In the 2016 census, Karron had "no people or a very low population".

In the 2021 census, Karron had "no people or a very low population".

== Education ==
There are no schools in Karron, nor nearby. The nearest schools are in Normanton. The alternatives are distance education and boarding school.
