= Bang Bang Jump Up =

Hill in Queensland, Australia

Bang Bang Jump Up is a solitary jump up in Stokes, Shire of Carpentaria, Queensland, Australia.

== Geography ==
Bang Bang Jump Up is 106 km southwest of Normanton on the Burke Developmental Road, where the terrain rises abruptly from 20 metres above sea level to 50 metres above sea level after many kilometres of flat terrain.

This jump up is one of the few elevated areas located in the middle of an expansive flat grassland.
