= Woolgar, Queensland =

Locality in northern Queensland, Australia

Woolgar
- Suburb
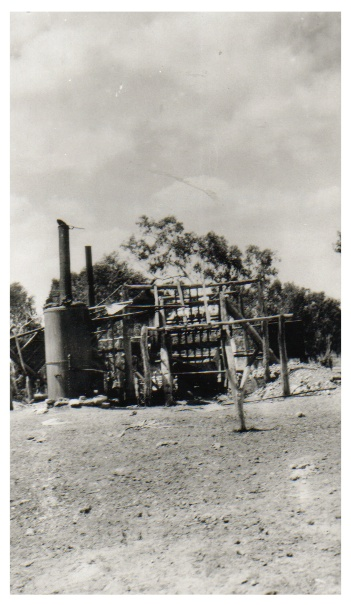
- Old Battery at Woolgar, 1931

- Interactive map of Woolgar
- Coordinates: 19.9926°S 143.4405°E
- Country: Australia
- State: Queensland
- LGA: Shire of Richmond
- Location: 126 km (78 mi) N of Richmond; 240 km (150 mi) NW of Hughenden; 531 km (330 mi) E of Mount Isa; 624 km (388 mi) W of Townsville; 1,710 km (1,060 mi) NW of Brisbane

Government
  - State electorate: Traeger
  - Federal division: Kennedy

Area
  - Total: 4,636.9 km^{2} (1,790.3 sq mi)

Population
  - Total: 17 (2021 census)
  - Density: 0.00367/km^{2} (0.00950/sq mi)
- Time zone: UTC+10:00 (AEST)
- Postcode: 4822
Suburbs around Woolgar
Bellfield	Gilberton	Porcupine
Saxby	Woolgar	Dutton River
Burleigh	Richmond	Dutton River

Woolgar is a rural locality in the Shire of Richmond, Queensland, Australia. In the 2021 census, Woolgar had a population of 17 people.

== Geography ==
The Woolgar River rises in the north-east and flows through to the south-west, exiting to Burleigh. Stawell River (also known as Cambridge Creek) enters the locality from the east (the locality of Dutton River) and exits to the west (Burleigh), where it becomes a tributary of the Woolgar River. The Dutton River enters the locality from the east (the locality of Dutton River) and forms part of the south-eastern boundary of the locality before exiting to the south (Richmond) where it becomes a tributary of the Flinders River.

Mount Norman is the north-west of the locality (19.7872°S 143.2799°E), rising to 410 metres (1,350 ft) above sea level.

The Richmond–Croydon Road crosses the north-western corner of the locality, entering from the west (Saxby) and exiting to the north-west (Bellfield).

The Rungulla Resources Reserve is in the north of the locality (19.5697°S 143.45917°E). Apart from this protected area, the land use is grazing on native vegetation.

== History ==
In 1880, gold was found in Woolgar, initiating a gold rush. The gold rush followed the common pattern of individual miners initially engaging in panning for gold, followed by digging to find shallow reefs, and then companies raising capital for the equipment to search for deep reefs.

On 14 September 1881, Sub-inspector Henry Pollock Kaye of the Native Mounted Police, was responding to complaints from at the Woolgar gold fields townspeople of the First Nations persons stealing and other offences. Together with other police and a native trooper, he mustered the indigenous persons to remove them from the area. It was indicated there may have been up to 800 indigenous persons in the area, although only some thirty to forty were to be removed. Within fifteen minutes of Sub-inspector Nichols leaving to get other officers, Kaye was fatally speared by the persons. A retaliatory massacre is believed to have occurred against the indigenous persons.

Woolgar Upper Provisional School opened on 19 June 1901 and Woolgar Lower Provisional School opened on 24 June 1901, to work together as part-time schools (meaning a single teacher was shared between them). They closed in October 1903 but reopened in April 1904. Woolgar Lower Provisional School closed on 11 October 1906 while Woolgar Upper Provisional School continued as a full-time school and closed circa 1912.

In 2000, the Woolgar Valley Aboriginal Corporation became the lessee of the 130,000-hectare (320,000-acre) Middle Park pastoral station, '"to provide opportunities for the traditional owners of that area, the Woolgar people, who mostly live in Yarrabah, Hopevale and Townsville".

== Demographics ==
In the 2016 census, Woolgar had a population of 8 people.

In the 2021 census, Woolgar had a population of 17 people.

== Education ==
There are no schools in Woolgar nor nearby. The alternatives are distance education and boarding school.
