= Northhead, Queensland =

Northhead
- Suburb
- Interactive map of Northhead
- Coordinates: 18.7283°S 143.1436°E
- Country: Australia
- State: Queensland
- LGA: Shire of Etheridge
- Location: 58.7 km (36.5 mi) SW of Forsayth; 97.6 km (60.6 mi) SSW of Georgetown; 474 km (295 mi) SW of Cairns; 505 km (314 mi) WNW of Townsville; 1,771 km (1,100 mi) NNW of Brisbane

Government
  - State electorate: Traeger
  - Federal division: Kennedy

Area
  - Total: 2,809.4 km^{2} (1,084.7 sq mi)

Population
  - Total: 0 (2021 census)
  - Density: 0.00000/km^{2} (0.0000/sq mi)
- Time zone: UTC+10:00 (AEST)
- Postcode: 4871
Suburbs around Northhead
Gilbert River	Georgetown	Georgetown
Esmeralda	Northhead	Forsayth
Esmeralda	Bellfield	Gilberton

Northhead is a rural locality in the Shire of Etheridge, Queensland, Australia. In the 2021 census, Northhead had "no people or a very low population".

== Geography ==
The Gilbert River flows through from south to north, where it forms part of the northern boundary. The Robertson River enters from the south-east and joins the Gilbert in the centre.

== Demographics ==
In the 2016 census, Northhead had "no people or a very low population".

In the 2021 census, Northhead had "no people or a very low population".

== Education ==
There are no schools in Northhead. The nearest government primary schools are Forsayth State School in neighbouring Forsayth to the east and Georgetown State School in neighbouring Georgetown to the north-east. However, these schools would be too distant from most parts of Northhead. Also there are no nearby secondary schools. The alternatives are distance education and boarding school.
