= Normanton Cemetery =

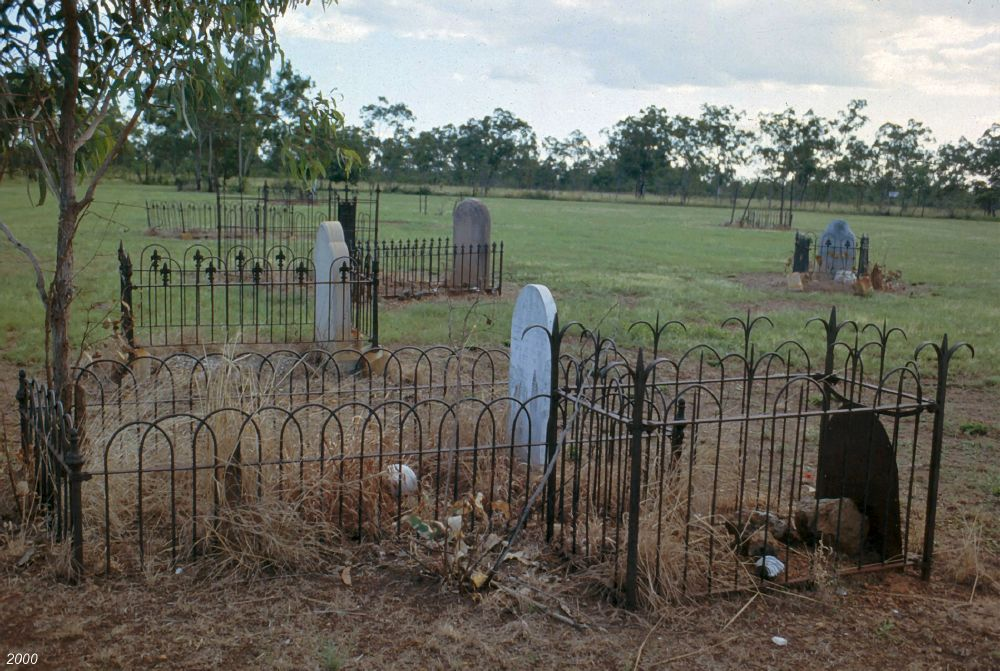
- Normanton Cemetery, 2000

- Location within Queensland Location within Australia
- 17.6843°S 141.0636°E
- Location: Burke Developmental Road, Normanton, Shire of Carpentaria, Queensland, Australia

History
- Design period: 1870s–1890s (late 19th century)
- Built: c. 1870

Queensland Heritage Register
- Official name: Normanton Cemetery
- Type: state heritage (built, landscape)
- Designated: 24 March 2000
- Reference no.: 601157
- Significant period: 1870– (fabric, social, historical)
- Significant components: burial/grave, cemetery, grave surrounds – iron bedstead/s, trees/plantings, denominational divisions, memorial/monument, headstone, grave marker, grave surrounds/railings, gate – entrance

Normanton Cemetery is a heritage-listed cemetery at Burke Developmental Road, Normanton, Shire of Carpentaria, Queensland, Australia. It was opened c. 1870. It was added to the Queensland Heritage Register on 24 March 2000.

== History ==
Normanton Cemetery has served the town and surrounding district since at least 1870. The cemetery, which is still in use, contains some unusual memorials and encapsulates information on the history of the area since settlement.

The first settlers in this area of north west Queensland were Liddle and Hertzer who selected Magowra Station in the 1860s. The settlement of Normanton was established in 1864 as a port and service centre for the surrounding pastoral ventures and was declared a town in 1868. In 1879 James Burns (later Burns Philp & Co) established a store there. Normanton, because of its location on the north coast of Australia, was utilised as a point of departure for goods and passengers destined for Europe, China, Asia and India. Wool, meat and later minerals were exported and the town was once suggested as the terminus of the proposed transcontinental rail line. With this suggestion, land prices in the town boomed with allotments selling for £200 in the early 1880s.

The discovery of gold in the Croydon district in 1885 and the subsequent demand for access to and from the port at Normanton saw the construction of the Normanton to Croydon Railway in 1891. By this time there were an estimated 2000 people in the town, which was a centre for government services. The Carpentaria Divisional Board office was the only brick building, but the town boasted a Police Court, Customs House, School of Arts, many hotels, two churches, a hospital and a school. Two newspapers were published bi-weekly and the town was connected to the outside world by the telegraph, a weekly steamer to the south and a train to Croydon three times a week in 1891.

The town did not develop as its early planners had hoped and when mineral prices fell and mining declined cattle were the main export by the First World War. Early in 1920 the steamer service was reduced to once in three weeks. Then Normanton was serviced from Thursday Island each month until the development of the beef road system in the 1960s. From this point, Normanton lost some of its isolation and commerce shifted to trade with the coastal towns of Queensland by road. With the reduction of the rural labour force, the town slowly declined until today there are 4200 people in the Carpentaria Shire including a substantial Aboriginal and Torres Strait Islander community.

The cemetery, in operation since at least 1870, has continued to serve the community of Normanton and the Carpentaria Shire for one hundred and thirty years.

== Description ==
The Normanton Cemetery Reserve covers eight hectares of flat ground on the southern outskirts of the town. Wooden gates mark the entrance to the well-maintained cemetery. There are lawn plots to the right of the front gate while the oldest burials are to the rear of the reserve. A modern fence surrounds the whole cemetery with some white cedar trees on the fence line although there are very few trees within the boundary.

It is divided into several areas including early graves, an old Chinese section, and a section for various religious denominations and a newer lawn cemetery area. Most of the graves have remained undisturbed and some are from the time before the cemetery was officially gazetted. The burial register dates from 18 August 1887, but one of the earliest headstones dates from 24 January 1870. In all there are over 1000 names in the burial register and the cemetery is still being used.

There are a remarkable variety of memorials. They range from marble and sandstone to wrought iron bedsteads; from the very simple to the ornate, from very well preserved to mere traces. The Chinese section is of particular interest as evidence of the part played by Chinese people in the development of the area.

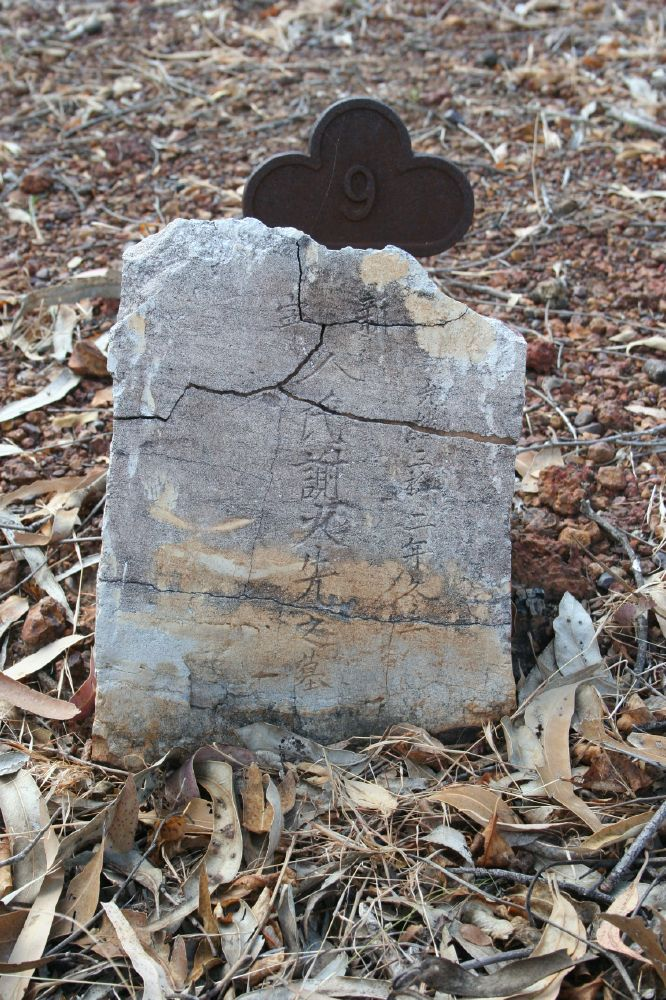
Chinese grave, 2010

The headstones consist of many forms of slab that were possibly imported from east coast or southern Queensland. Some of the graves are still enclosed by wrought iron railings, which seem to be in good condition. Some have sheet galvanised iron around them while others have a galvanised metal shelter over the main part of the grave and some have small shelters for flowers. Most of the headstones are small, indicating the difficulty of transportation to the isolated north west of Queensland.

Iron bedsteads bound many graves of small children; some with the testers to hold mosquito nets still attached. Some of these are further decorated with large seashells. One grave is outlined with large turbinate seashells, covered with small gravel and marked by a small burial marker.

There is one Commonwealth war grave of a Private of the Australian Volunteer Defence Corps of World War II.

== Heritage listing ==
Normanton Cemetery was listed on the Queensland Heritage Register on 24 March 2000 having satisfied the following criteria.

The place is important in demonstrating the evolution or pattern of Queensland's history.

The Normanton Cemetery, in use from at least 1870, reflects the development of the region from that period to the present day.

The economic and social history of the district can be read through the inscriptions and type of material used in headstones. Nationality, health, social status, lodge affiliation, occupation, religion and cause of death are often included in the inscriptions. Family relationships can be noted and the high infant mortality and death in childbirth are often recorded. The large number of single graves is illustrative of the hardship and isolation of pioneering life in north west Queensland.

The place is important in demonstrating the principal characteristics of a particular class of cultural places.

The cemetery is an important record of the cultural development of the area, showing the ethnicity, occupations and social status of the inhabitants of Normanton and the Carpentaria Shire since settlement.

The place has a strong or special association with a particular community or cultural group for social, cultural or spiritual reasons.

The cemetery is significant for its high spiritual and symbolic value to the community because of its continuity of use as a burial place for the region for one hundred and thirty years.
