= Saxby, Queensland =

Saxby
- Suburb
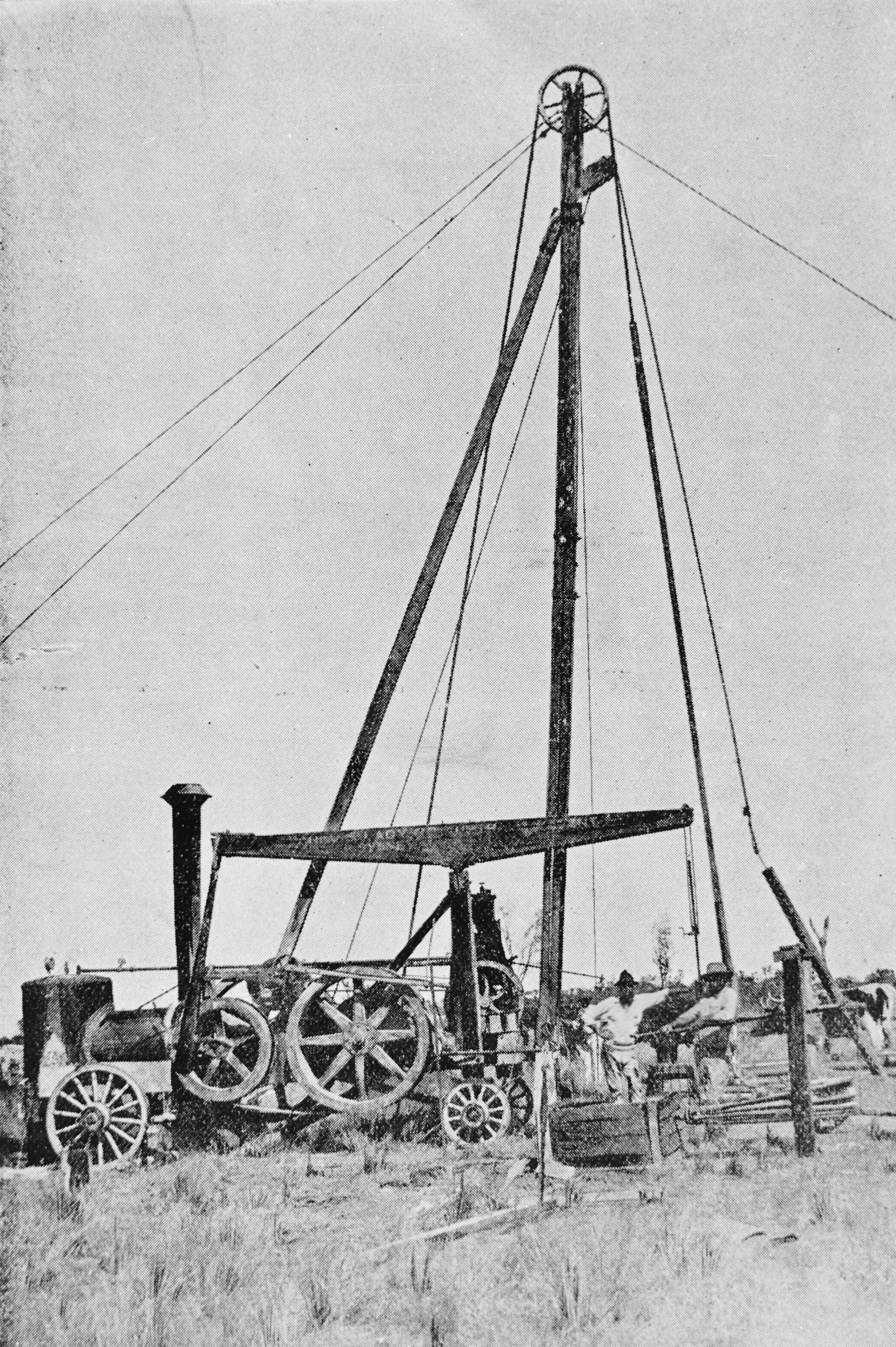
- Sinking an artesian bore on Saxby Downs Station, circa 1893

- Interactive map of Saxby
- Coordinates: 19.8902°S 142.6661°E
- Country: Australia
- State: Queensland
- LGA: Shire of Richmond
- Location: 116 km (72 mi) NNW of Richmond; 230 km (140 mi) NW of Hughenden; 521 km (324 mi) ENE of Mount Isa; 614 km (382 mi) W of Townsville; 1,701 km (1,057 mi) NW of Brisbane

Government
  - State electorate: Traeger
  - Federal division: Kennedy

Area
  - Total: 3,333.4 km^{2} (1,287.0 sq mi)

Population
  - Total: 35 (2021 census)
  - Density: 0.01050/km^{2} (0.0272/sq mi)
- Time zone: UTC+10:00 (AEST)
- Postcode: 4822
Suburbs around Saxby
Malpas-Trenton	Victoria Vale	Bellfield
Malpas-Trenton	Saxby	Woolgar
Cambridge	Cambridge	Burleigh

Saxby is an outback rural locality in the Shire of Richmond, Queensland, Australia. In the 2021 census, Saxby had a population of 35 people.

== Geography ==
Express Creek loosely forms part of the south-eastern and southern boundary of the locality.

The Saxby River rises in the north-east of the locality, briefly flows through neighbouring Victoria Vale to the north before re-entering the locality in the north-east and then flowing south-west through the locality, exiting the locality through the south-western corner into Cambridge.

The Richmond–Woogar Road (part of the Richmond–Croydon Road) enters the locality from the south-east (Burleigh), runs north along the locality's eastern boundary, and then cross through the north-eastern corner of the locality, exiting to the north-east (Bellfield).

As at 2025, the Saxby Downs pastoral station occupies roughly the west half of the locality and extends into neighbouring Malpas-Trenton.

The land use in the locality is grazing on native vegetation.

== History ==
Saxby Downs pastoral station has existed since at least 1877. In 1893, an artesian bore struck water at 700 feet (210 m).

== Demographics ==
In the 2016 census, Saxby had a population of 12 people.

In the 2021 census, Saxby had a population of 35 people.

== Education ==
There are no schools in Saxby, nor nearby. The options are distance education and boarding school.
