= Malpas-Trenton, Queensland =

Malpas-Trenton
- Suburb
- Interactive map of Malpas-Trenton
- Coordinates: 19.9684°S 142.1656°E
- Country: Australia
- State: Queensland
- LGA: Shire of Mckinlay
- Location: 70.7 km (43.9 mi) NE of Julia Creek; 277 km (172 mi) WNW of Hughenden; 328 km (204 mi) ENE of Mount Isa; 662 km (411 mi) WSW of Townsville; 1,701 km (1,057 mi) NW of Brisbane

Government
  - State electorate: Traeger
  - Federal division: Kennedy

Area
  - Total: 6,402.2 km^{2} (2,471.9 sq mi)

Population
  - Total: 0 (2021 census)
  - Density: 0.00000/km^{2} (0.00000/sq mi)
- Time zone: UTC+10:00 (AEST)
- Postcode: 4816
Suburbs around Malpas-Trenton
Savannah	Savannah	Victoria Vale
Taldora	Malpas-Trenton	Saxby
Julia Creek	Maxwelton	Cambridge

Malpas-Trenton is an outback locality in the Shire of Mckinlay, Queensland, Australia. In the 2021 census, Malpas-Trenton had "no people or a very low population".

== Geography ==
The Flinders River forms most of the southern boundary before flowing through to the west.

== Demographics ==
In the 2016 census, Malpas-Trenton had a population of 23 people.

In the 2021 census, Malpas-Trenton had "no people or a very low population".

== Education ==
There are no schools in Malpas-Trenton. The nearest government primary school is Julia Creek State School in neighbouring Julia Creek to the south-west; however, it would be too distant from most parts of Malpas-Trenton. Also, there are no nearby secondary schools. The alternatives are distance education and boarding school.
