= Cloncurry River =

Cloncurry
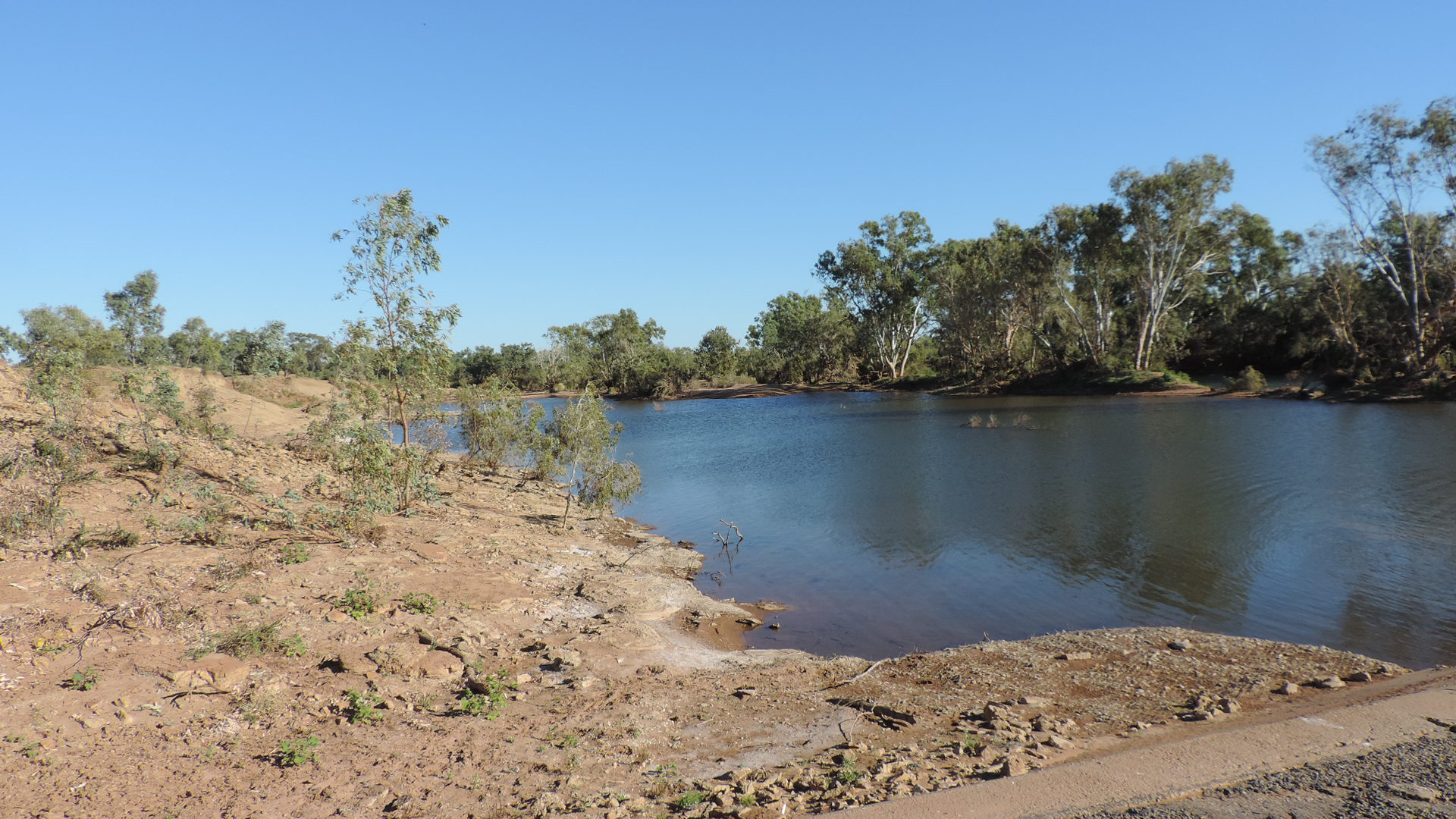
- Cloncurry River where the Wills Developmental Road crosses, Taldora, 2019

- Location of Cloncurry river mouth in Queensland

Location
- Country: Australia
- State: Queensland
- Region: Gulf Country

Physical characteristics
- Source: Mount Tracey
  - location: Selwyn Range, Gulf Country, Australia
  - elevation: 383 m (1,257 ft)
- Mouth
  - location: Flinders River, Australia
  - coordinates: 18°36′30″S 140°39′52″E
  - elevation: 30 m (98 ft)
- Length: 900 km (560 mi)
- Basin size: 47,344 km^{2} (18,280 sq mi)

The Cloncurry River is situated in the Gulf Country of north west Queensland, Australia.

== Geography ==
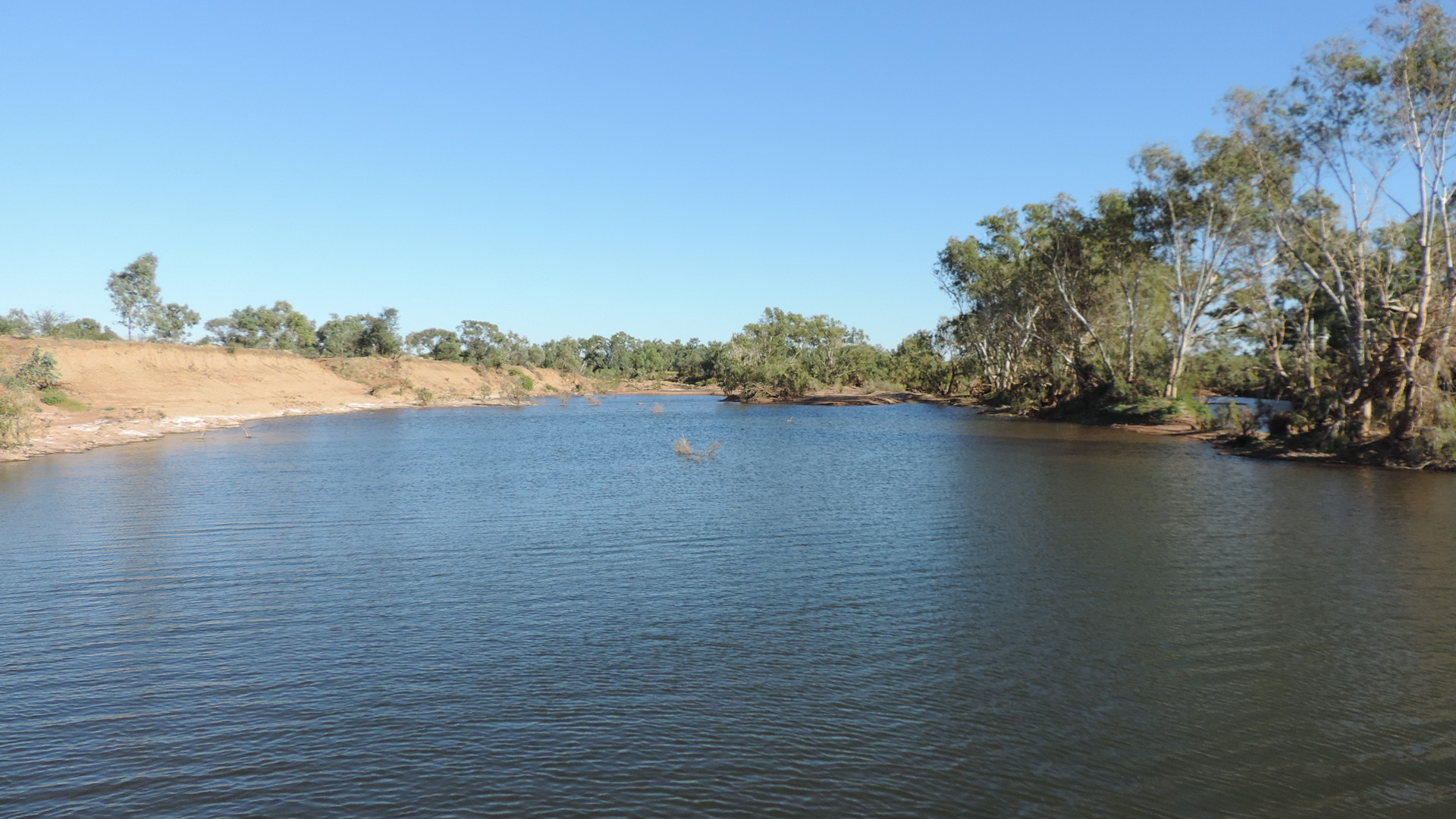
Crossing the Cloncurry River, Taldora, June 2019

The headwaters of the river rise west of Mount Boorama near Mount Tracey in the Selwyn Range and initially flows north west then turns north travelling more or less parallel with the Cloncurry-Dajarra road before crossing the Flinders Highway near the town of Cloncurry. The river continues north westward flowing under Mount Marathon past Fort Constantine and crossing the Wills Developmental Road. Continuing northward the river is a series of braided channel running parallel with the Burke Developmental Road across the mostly uninhabited plains with many tributaries entering then across Simpson Plain before discharging into the Flinders River of which it is a tributary near Wondoola in Stokes.

The riverbed is composed of Silt with clay and sand, sand and gravel and gravel with cobble.

The river has a length of about 900 kilometres (560 mi) and has a drainage basin of about 47,344 square kilometres (18,280 sq mi).

The watershed south of the town of Cloncurry occupies an area of 5,975 square kilometres (2,307 sq mi).

== History ==
Kalkatunga (also known as Kalkadoon, Kalkadunga, Kalkatungu) is an Australian Aboriginal language. The Kalkatunga language region is North-West Queensland including the local government areas of the City of Mount Isa.

The river was named by the explorer Robert O'Hara Burke on New Years Day 1861 during his disastrous expedition after a friend from Ireland, Lady Cloncurry.

A gauging station was installed at Cloncurry to measure flow rates and river heights in 1969.

== See also ==
- List of rivers of Australia
