= Claraville, Queensland =

Claraville
- Suburb
- Interactive map of Claraville
- Coordinates: 18.5498°S 141.7661°E
- Country: Australia
- State: Queensland
- LGA: Shire of Croydon
- Location: 80.9 km (50.3 mi) SW of Croydon; 179 km (111 mi) SSE of Normanton; 604 km (375 mi) WSW of Cairns; 632 km (393 mi) NE of Mount Isa; 1,958 km (1,217 mi) NW of Brisbane

Government
  - State electorate: Traeger
  - Federal division: Kennedy

Area
  - Total: 7,537.7 km^{2} (2,910.3 sq mi)

Population
  - Total: 0 (2021 census)
  - Density: 0.00000/km^{2} (0.00000/sq mi)
- Postcode: 4871
Suburbs around Claraville
Normanton; Stokes	Blackbull	Coralie
Fielding	Claraville	Croydon; Esmeralda
Savannah	East Creek	Savannah

Claraville is a locality in the Shire of Croydon, Queensland, Australia. In the 2021 census, Claraville had "no people or a very low population".

== Geography ==
The Norman River forms part of the western boundary.

The Gulf Developmental Road (National Highway 1) runs along a short section of the northern boundary.

== Demographics ==
In the 2016 census, Claraville had a population of 5 people.

In the 2021 census, Claraville had "no people or a very low population".

== Education ==
There are no schools in Claraville. The nearest government schools are Normanton State School (Prep–10) in Normanton and Croydon State School (Prep–6) in Croydon . There are no nearby secondary schools providing Years 11 and 12 schooling; the alternatives are distance education and boarding school.
