= Normanton, Queensland =

Normanton
- Town
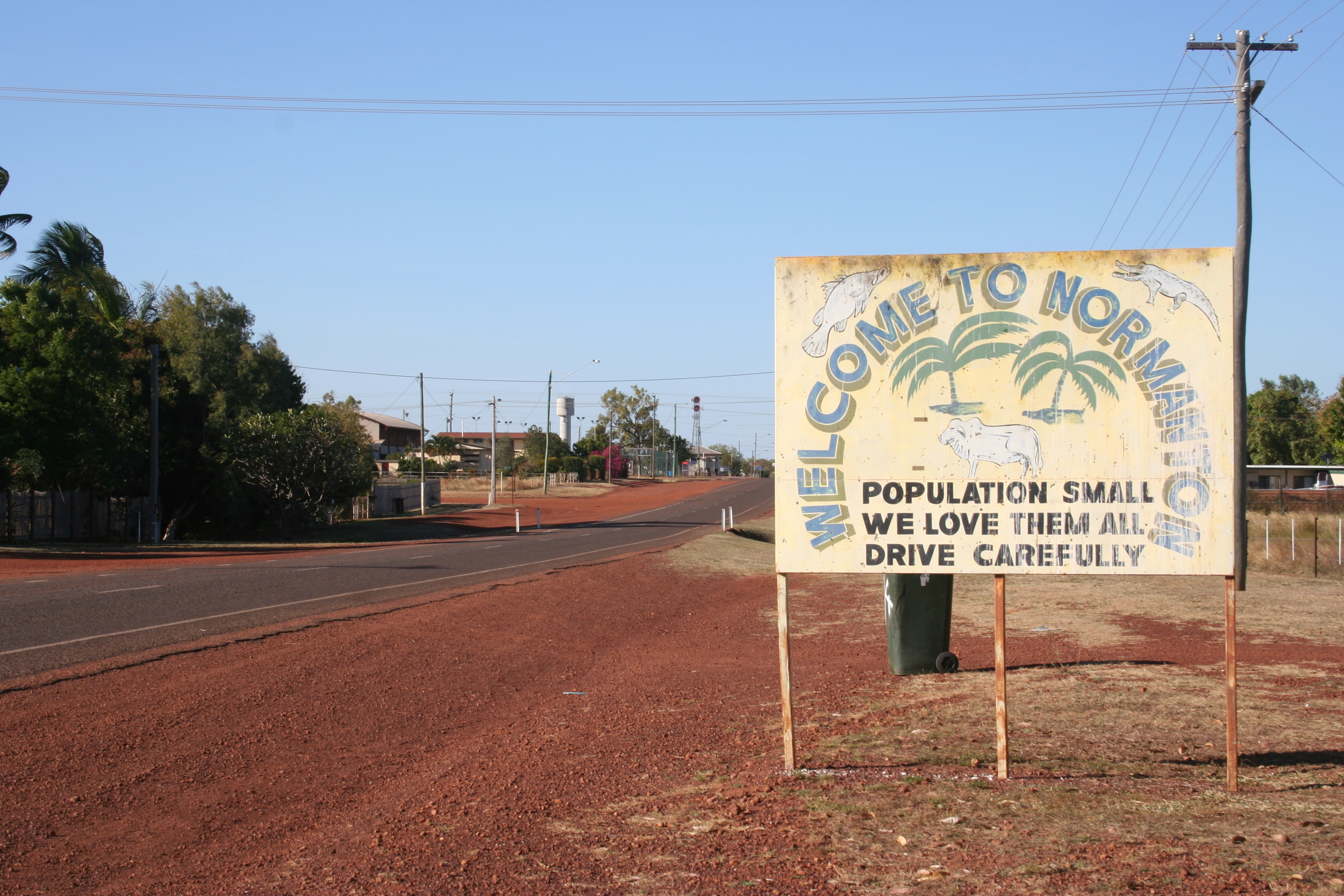
- Entry into Normanton

- Interactive map of Normanton
- Coordinates: 17.6702°S 141.0791°E
- Country: Australia
- State: Queensland
- LGA: Shire of Carpentaria
- Location: 328 km (204 mi) NNE of Cloncurry; 498 km (309 mi) NNE of Mount Isa; 678 km (421 mi) W of Cairns; 848 km (527 mi) WNW of Townsville; 2,065 km (1,283 mi) NW of Brisbane
- Established: 1867

Government
  - State electorate: Traeger
  - Federal division: Kennedy

Area
  - Total: 7,161.7 km^{2} (2,765.1 sq mi)

Population
  - Total: 1,391 (2021 census)
  - Density: 0.19423/km^{2} (0.50305/sq mi)
- Time zone: UTC+10:00 (AEST)
- Postcode: 4890
- Mean max temp: 33.4 °C (92.1 °F)
- Mean min temp: 21.3 °C (70.3 °F)
- Annual rainfall: 921.7 mm (36.29 in)
Localities around Normanton
Gulf of Carpentaria	Karumba	Howitt; Karron
Carpentaria	Normanton	Blackbull
Stokes	Stokes	Claraville

Normanton is an outback town and coastal locality in the Shire of Carpentaria, Queensland, Australia. At the 2021 census, the locality of Normanton had a population of 1,391 people, and the town of Normanton had a population of 1,326 people.

It is the administrative centre of the Shire of Carpentaria. It has a tropical savanna climate and the main economy of the locality is cattle grazing.

The town is one terminus of the isolated Normanton to Croydon railway line, which was built during gold rush days in the 1890s. The Gulflander passenger train operates once a week along the railway line.

Two of Australia's big things are in Normanton: the "Big Barramundi" and "Krys, the Savannah King" (a saltwater crocodile). There are also many heritage-listed sites, reflecting Normanton's history.

In the 2021 census, the locality of Normanton had a population of 1,391 people.

== Geography ==
Normanton is in the Gulf Country region of northwest Queensland, just south of the Gulf of Carpentaria, on the Norman River in Queensland. It is a small cattle town and coastal locality, and administrative centre of the Shire of Carpentaria.

The main street is Landsborough Street.

An unusual feature 106 kilometres (66 mi) southwest of Normanton is Bang Bang Jump Up, one of the few hills located in the middle of an expansive, flat grassland.

== History ==
The town sits in the traditional lands of the Gkuthaarn (Kareldi) and Kukatj people.

The town takes its name from the Norman River, which was named in honour of William Henry Norman of the Victorian Naval Forces, who commanded the sloop HMCS Victoria in the search for the explorers Burke and Wills and also conducted hydrographic surveys of the Gulf of Carpentaria and the Torres Strait to identify reefs and other marine hazards.

An expedition to explore the Norman River and Bynoe River led to the identification of a new town site on the Norman River in May 1867. The new town of Norman was surveyed by George Phillips in December 1867 and was officially gazetted on 8 August 1868. It was seen as an alternative to Burketown which had issues with fever and flooding. On 11 October 1868 the first land sale of 167 town lots of 1/4 and 1/2 acre (0.10 and 0.20 ha) was held at the Norman Police Office.

Norman River Post Office opened on 13 June 1868 and was renamed Normanton by 1872.

Normanton State School opened in September 1882. In January 1976 a secondary department was added to the school. The school celebrated its centenary in 1982.

The Burns Philp store, a general mercantile store and agency office, was opened in 1884. It is the oldest intact Burns Philp store in Queensland.

Normanton grew slowly until the discovery of gold at Croydon in 1885 provided a major boost, attracting people from a variety of cultures, including Chinese people drawn to the gold fields. Like other towns in the Gulf country Chinese men often supplied local vegetables from their market gardens. Some married locally to either white or indigenous women and many families were the result. Although Normanton appears to have had some "Chinese gardens" very early in its history with reference in 1873 to the "Chinese gardens, their houses, and live stock, have been swept away." According to historian Sandi Robb there were 6 families of mixed heritage in Normanton.

The town prosperity was assisted by the completion of the Normanton – Croydon railway in 1889 which saw Normanton becoming the acknowledged gateway to north-western Queensland. The new link was to bring both people and wealth to the area.

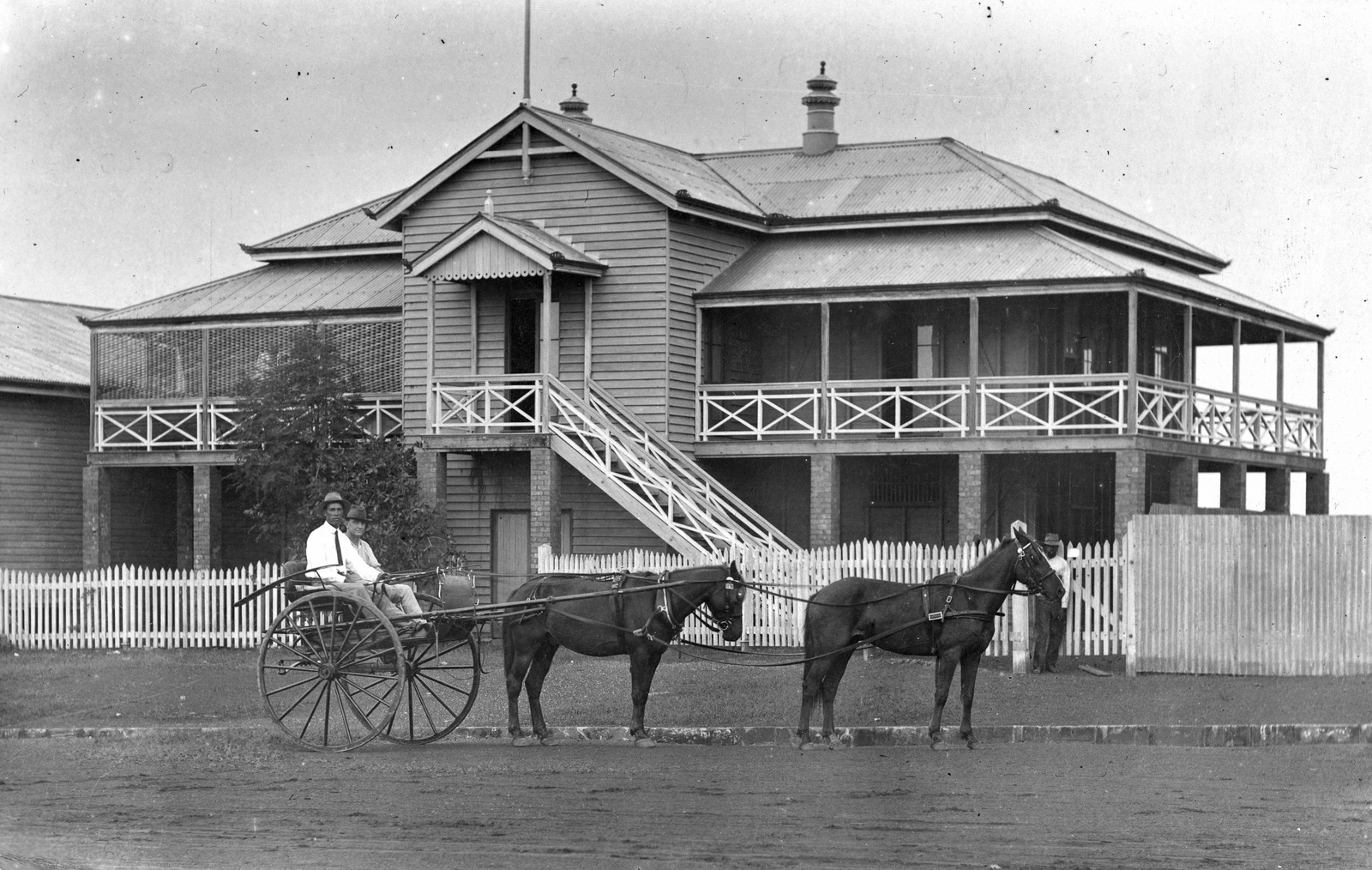
Old Customs House, Normanton, ca. 1913. John Oxley Library, State Library of Queensland.

The population reached 1,251 by 1891. The gold boom at Croydon was short-lived and the completion of the Townsville – Cloncurry railway in 1908, reduced Normanton's relative importance as a centre. After the gold ran out and the mining industry grew to a halt in the early 1900s, pastoralism became the main industry of the region.

Some Aboriginal groups in the region were moved on to cattle stations to provide labour, while other groups were more or less extinguished. Many were moved to missions on Mornington Island and Doomadgee. Aboriginal camps were set up on the outskirts of the town, and the first Aboriginal reserve was gazetted in 1935; both were still in existence until at least 1976.

By 1947 the town's population had declined to 234.

In the 1960s there was a resurgence in Normanton's population as a gateway to the Gulf of Carpentaria with major industrial development taking place in the prawn fishing industry at nearby Karumba at the mouth of the Norman River.

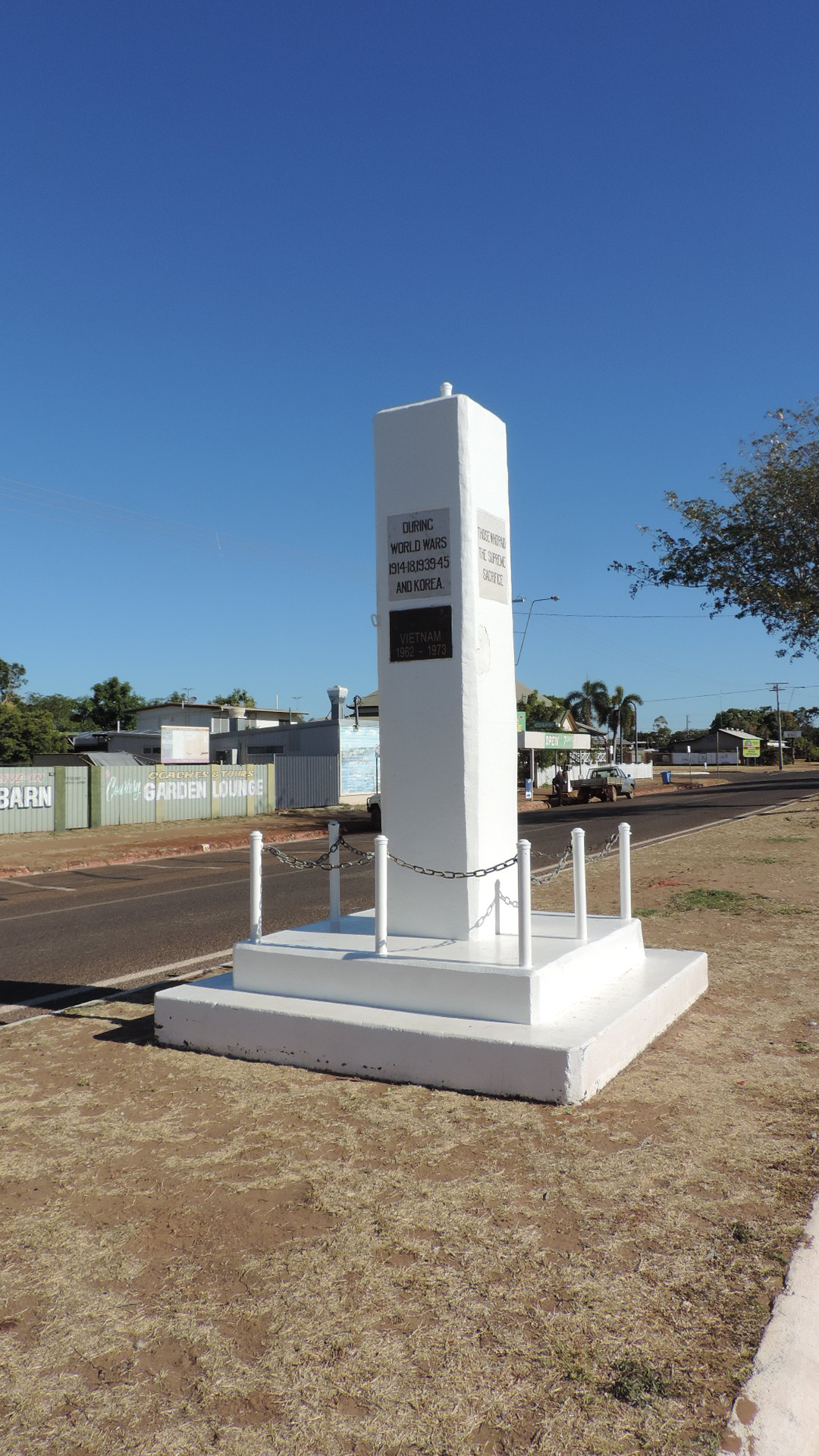
War memorial, Normanton, 2019

In 1965, the Carpentaria Shire Council erected a war memorial in the centre of Landsborough Street opposite the National Hotel (17.67022°S 141.07888°E). It commemorates those who served in all conflicts.

Gulf Christian College was established on 24 January 1990 by the Normanton Assembly of God Church.

The Normanton library was opened in 2004.

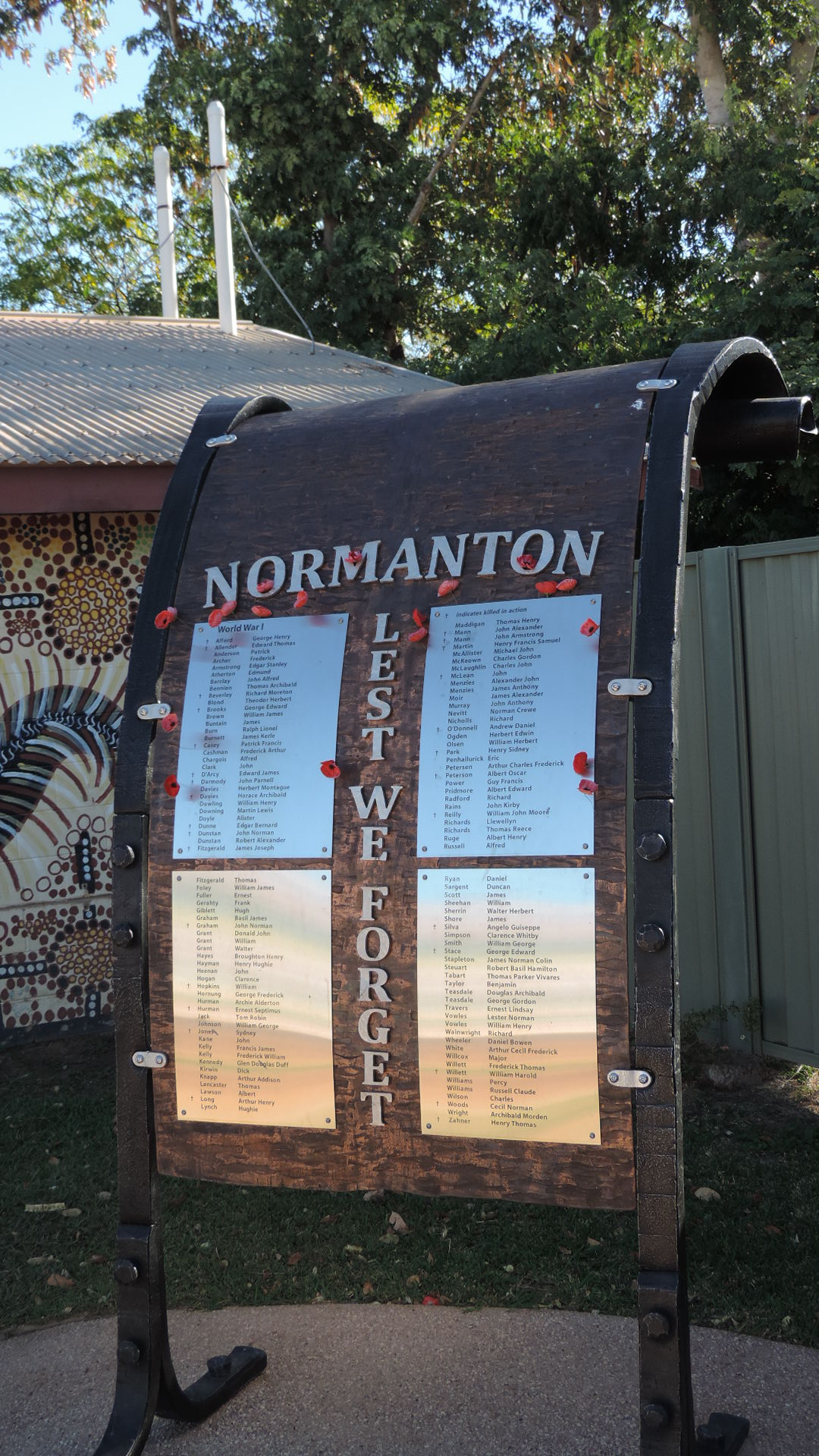
Normanton ANZAC Roll of Honour, 2019

The Normanton Anzac Roll of Honour was unveiled on Tuesday 13 June 2017, as part of the First World War centenary commemorations. It lists the names of the Anzacs (those who served in World War I) from the Carpentaria Shire. It is located on Landsborough Street opposite the war memorial (17.670294°S 141.078925°E).

=== Native title ===
After seeking rights since 1996, in November 2012 the traditional owners, the Gkuthaarn and Kukatj people, lodged a claim for native title over an area around Normanton stretching 16,000 square kilometres (6,200 sq mi). On 2 July 2020 an Indigenous land use agreement was signed, and they were granted rights to fish, hunt and perform their ceremonies on the land. Pastoralists are still able to run cattle on the cattle stations in the area, and the Aboriginal people assist with management of the land (such as pest and weed control) and cultural heritage sites. They are already monitoring and counting of migratory seabirds, with many participating as Indigenous rangers in the Normanton Land and Sea Ranger Group. Some land in the southern part of the claimed area has been determined as "native title extinguished".

== Demographics ==
In the 2006 census, the town of Normanton had a population of 1,100 people, of whom 60% identified as Aboriginal and/or Torres Strait Islander people.

In the 2016 census, the locality of Normanton had a population of 1,257 people, of whom 750 (60%) identified as Aboriginal and/or Torres Strait Islander people, while the town of Normanton had a population of 1,210 people, of whom 743 (62%) identified as Aboriginal and/or Torres Strait Islander people.

In the 2021 census, the locality of Normanton had a population of 1,391 people, of whom 774 (55.6%) identified as Aboriginal and/or Torres Strait Islander people. The town of Normanton had a population of 1,326 people, of whom 766 (57.8%) identified as Aboriginal and/or Torres Strait Islander people.

== Heritage listings ==
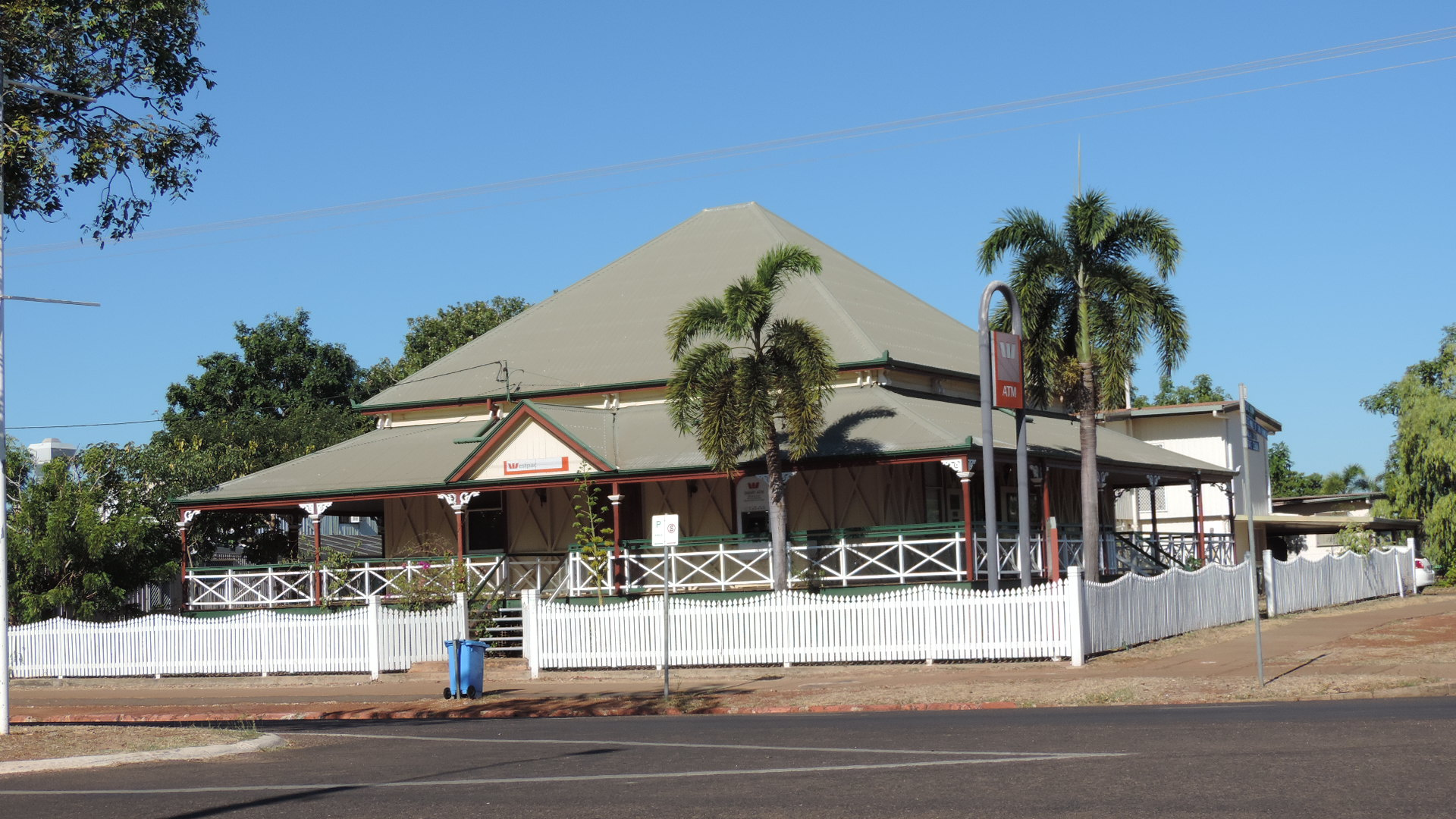
Westpac bank building, Normanton, 2019

Normanton has a number of heritage-listed sites, including:

- Burke and Wills Camp B/CXIX, Burke and Wills Access Road (Private Road)
- Normanton Cemetery, Burke Developmental Road
- Normanton Gaol, 27 Haigh Street
- Burns Philp Building, corner of Landsborough Street and Caroline Street
- Westpac Bank Building, Landsborough Street
- Normanton railway station, Matilda Street
- Normanton to Croydon railway line, from Normanton to Croydon

== Climate ==
Normanton has a tropical savanna climate (Köppen Aw) with two distinct seasons. There is a hot, humid and extremely uncomfortable wet season from December to March and a hot and generally rainless dry season usually extending from April to November. During the wet season most roads in the area are usually closed by heavy rainfall, which on several occasions has exceeded 650 millimetres (26 in) in a month or 250 millimetres (10 in) in a day from tropical cyclones. On occasions, as with all of Queensland, the wet season may fail and deliver as little as 240 millimetres (9.4 in) between December 1934 and March 1935

Temperatures are uniformly hot, ranging from 36.8 °C (98 °F) in November just before the wet season begins to 29 °C (84 °F) at the height of the dry season in July. In the wet season, temperatures are marginally lower, but extremely high humidity means conditions are very uncomfortable and wet bulb temperatures averages 25 °C (77 °F) and can reach 28 °C (82 °F). In the dry season, lower humidity, cloudless days and cool nights provides for more pleasant conditions.

Climate data for Normanton Post Office, Queensland
Month	Jan	Feb	Mar	Apr	May	Jun	Jul	Aug	Sep	Oct	Nov	Dec	Year
Record high °C (°F)	43.1 (109.6)	41.0 (105.8)	40.1 (104.2)	39.5 (103.1)	37.2 (99.0)	35.6 (96.1)	35.6 (96.1)	38.3 (100.9)	40.1 (104.2)	41.8 (107.2)	43.3 (109.9)	43.3 (109.9)	43.3 (109.9)
Mean daily maximum °C (°F)	34.7 (94.5)	33.9 (93.0)	34.2 (93.6)	34.0 (93.2)	31.7 (89.1)	29.2 (84.6)	29.1 (84.4)	31.1 (88.0)	33.9 (93.0)	35.9 (96.6)	36.8 (98.2)	36.1 (97.0)	33.4 (92.1)
Mean daily minimum °C (°F)	25.1 (77.2)	24.9 (76.8)	24.4 (75.9)	22.4 (72.3)	19.1 (66.4)	16.1 (61.0)	15.2 (59.4)	16.5 (61.7)	19.5 (67.1)	22.6 (72.7)	24.7 (76.5)	25.3 (77.5)	21.3 (70.3)
Record low °C (°F)	18.3 (64.9)	17.3 (63.1)	16.7 (62.1)	14.4 (57.9)	7.2 (45.0)	6.7 (44.1)	7.0 (44.6)	6.6 (43.9)	11.1 (52.0)	13.7 (56.7)	15.5 (59.9)	18.9 (66.0)	6.6 (43.9)
Average rainfall mm (inches)	260.2 (10.24)	249.2 (9.81)	157.7 (6.21)	30.9 (1.22)	7.5 (0.30)	9.2 (0.36)	3.2 (0.13)	1.7 (0.07)	3.0 (0.12)	10.5 (0.41)	45.1 (1.78)	144.4 (5.69)	922.6 (36.34)
Average rainy days (≥ 0.2 mm)	13.9	13.9	9.4	2.4	0.9	0.7	0.5	0.3	0.4	1.3	4.4	9.0	57.1
Average relative humidity (%)	74	78	70	57	52	52	48	44	45	49	54	65	57

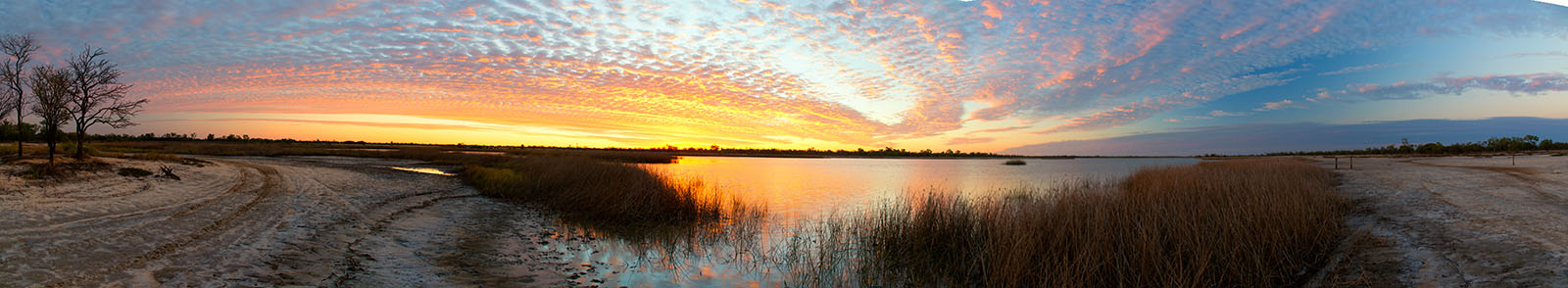
An early October sunset at Mutton Hole Wetlands near Normanton, QLD Australia.

== Economy ==
The major industry is cattle grazing with a number of homesteads in the locality, including:

- Glenore (17.8525°S 141.1258°E)
- Inverleigh (18.0070°S 140.5653°E)
- Magowra (17.7789°S 140.8792°E)
- Milgarra (18.1857°S 140.8941°E)
- Mutton Hole (17.6191°S 141.1862°E)
- Shady Lagoon (17.7338°S 141.1022°E)

== Tourism ==
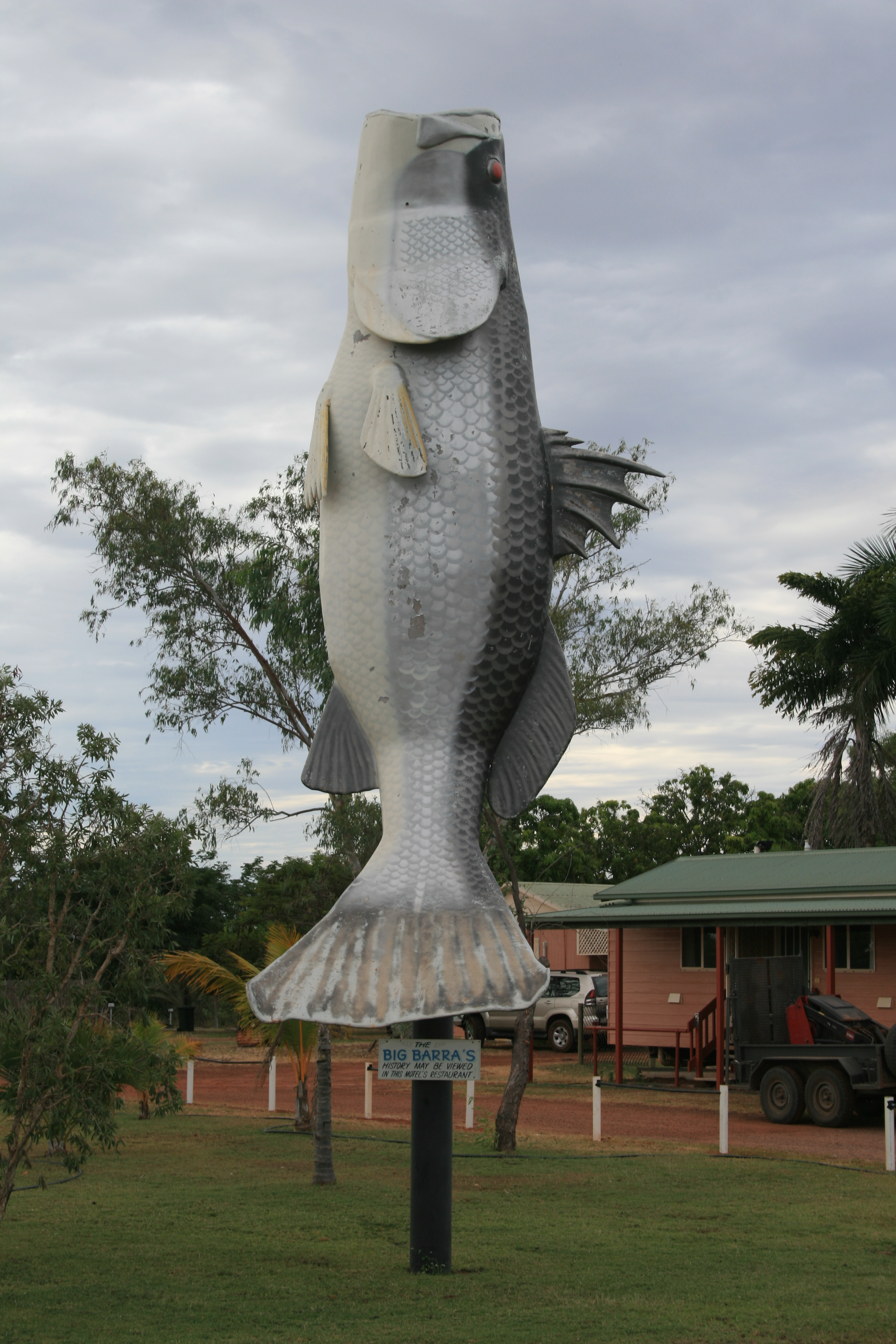
The Big Barramundi

Tourism has recently become an important part of the economy of Normanton, with the Gulflander a significant draw-card.

Among Normanton's most notable features is a statue of an 8.64-metre (28.3 ft) long saltwater crocodile named Krys, the largest ever taken, which was shot by Krystina Pawlowska in July 1957 in the Norman River.

"The Big Barramundi" was constructed in 1995. It is 6 metres (20 ft) long.

Barramundi and threadfin salmon can be caught in the river.

There are a number of reminders of Normanton's history and development that visitors to the area are still able to see today. These include the Normanton cemetery which dates from 1867, the railway station and the station building both dating from 1891, as well as the former Burns Philp & Co. store.

Normanton railway station is a railway museum and the terminus for rides on the Gulflander (17.6728°S 141.0724°E).

The tourist information centre is located in the Burns Philp Building (17.6678°S 141.0813°E).

== Education ==
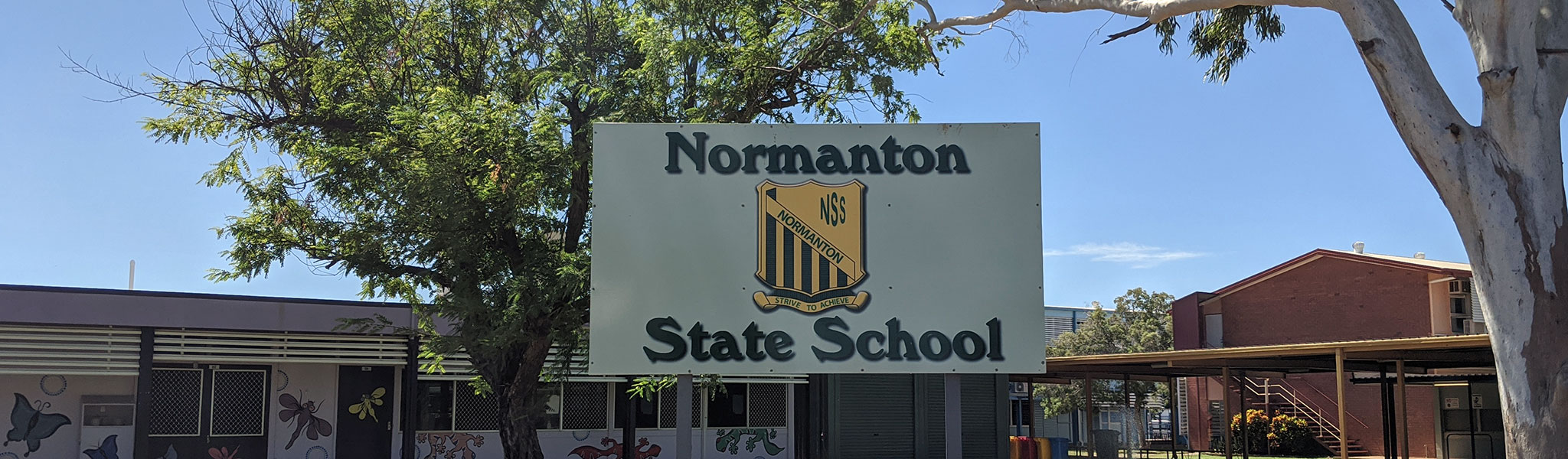
Normanton State School, 2023

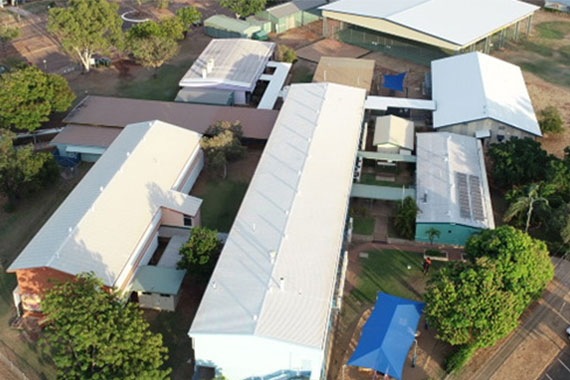
Aerial view of Normanton State School, 2023

Normanton State School is a government primary and secondary (Prep–10) school for boys and girls at 6–12 Little Brown Street (17.6720°S 141.0790°E). In 2018, the school had an enrolment of 132 students with 23 teachers and 24 non-teaching staff (16 full-time equivalent). It includes a special education program.

Gulf Christian College is a private primary and secondary (Prep–9) school for boys and girls at 24-30 Brown Street (17.6709°S 141.0798°E). It offers Prep, Primary (1–6) and Middle (7–9) School education. In 2018, the school had an enrolment of 96 students with 9 teachers and 14 non-teaching staff (11 full-time equivalent).

There is no secondary education to Year 12 available in or nearby Normanton. The options are distance education and boarding schools. Many of the students of Gulf Christian College attend Senior (10–12) School at Nambour Christian College.

TAFE Queensland operates a technical college campus in Normanton (17.6802°S 141.0745°E).

== Facilities ==
The Carpentaria Shire Council's offices are at 29–33 Haig Street (17.66884°S 141.08019°E). It also has offices in Karumba.

Normanton Police Station is at 55 Haig Street (17.6688°S 141.0794°E).

Normanton Hospital is a public hospital on Hospital Road (17.6783°S 141.0865°E).

Normanton Fire Station is a rural fire station at 57 Thompson Street (17.6731°S 141.0793°E). The Normanton SES Facility (17.6729°S 141.0796°E) and the Normanton Ambulance Station are co-located with the fire station.

There are two cemeteries in Normanton:

- Normanton Cemetery on the Burke Developmental Road (17.6843°S 141.0637°E)
- Aboriginal Burial Grounds off the Burke Developmental Road on the west bank of the Norman River (17.6714°S 141.0888°E) which is not open to the public

Normanton Solar Farm (17.6809°S 141.0500°E) generates solar power to provide greater reliability to the town, which is supplied via long lines from distant power stations.

The Centrelink office for government payment and services is at 5 Old Croydon Road (17.6733°S 141.0738°E).

== Amenities ==
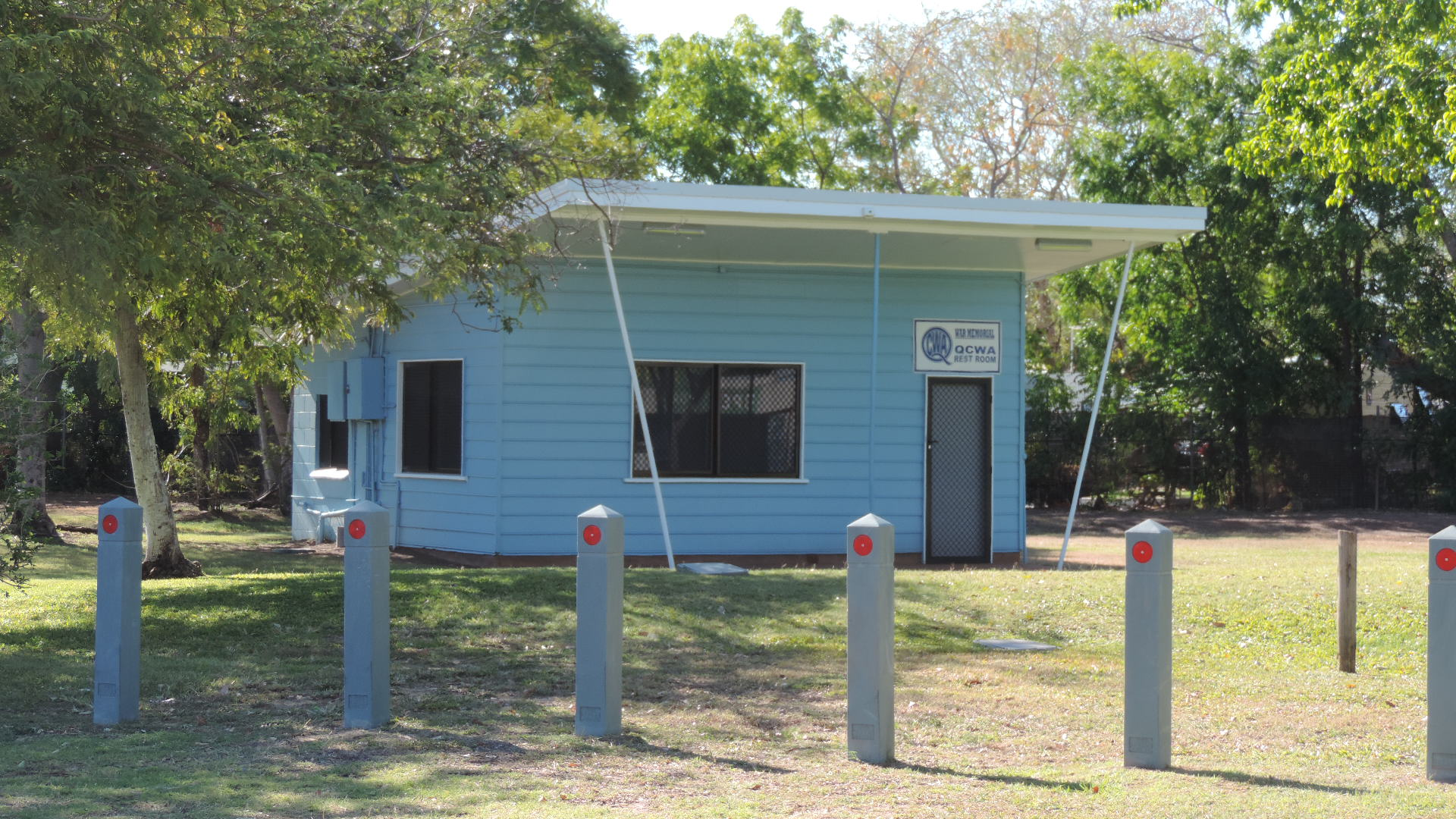
Queensland Country Women's Association rooms, 2019

The Normanton branch of the Queensland Country Women's Association has its rooms in Landsborough Street.

Bynoe Hall is a public hall at 15 Balonne Street (17.6707°S 141.0742°E).

Our Lady Help of Christians Catholic Church is at 26 Dutton Street (17.6727°S 141.0742°E). It is within the Gulf Savannah Parish of the Roman Catholic Diocese of Cairns.

The Aboriginal and Islander Christian Fellowship operates the Normanton Christian Centre at 46 Dutton Street (17.6747°S 141.0760°E).

There is a boat ramp with a floating walkway and jetty on the south bank of the Norman River (17.6644°S 141.0871°E). It is managed by the Carpentaria Shire Council.

Normanton public library and visitor information services are located in the historic Burns Philp Building at the corner of Caroline and Landsborough Streets.

There are a number of sporting facilities:

- Normanton Bowls Club (17.6748°S 141.0723°E)
- Normanton Golf Club (17.6900°S 141.0607°E)
- Normanton Gun Club (17.7038°S 141.0890°E)
- Normanton Racecourse and Rodeo Ground (17.6938°S 141.0594°E)
- Normanton Sport Centre (17.6750°S 141.0722°E)

== Transport ==
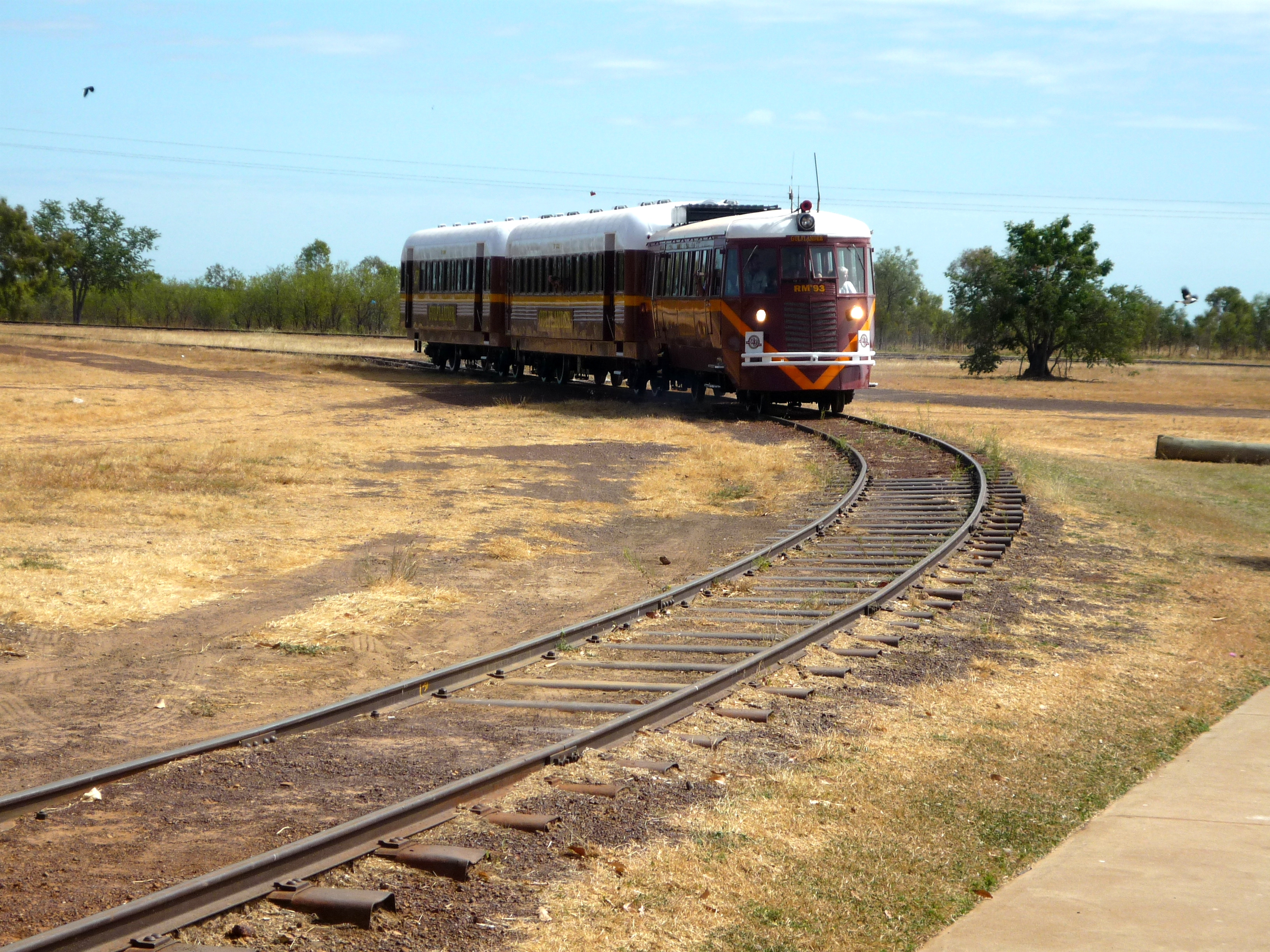
The Gulflander, 2011

The Gulf Developmental Road, part of the Savannah Way tourist drive, commences 6 kilometres (3.7 mi) south of the town.

The Gulflander passenger train operates weekly on a 151 km (94 mi) remnant of the Normanton to Croydon historical railway. The Normanton railway station features a large steel frame with an open canopy to provide shade.

Normanton Airport is on Airport Road (17.6883°S 141.0717°E). There are services from Normanton to destinations including Cairns, Burketown, Doomadgee and Mount Isa.

There are a number of airstrips within the locality at:

- Magowra homestead (17.7828°S 140.8771°E)
- Mutton Hole homestead (17.6240°S 141.1859°E)
- Inverleigh East homestead (18.0050°S 140.5365°E)
- Sawtell Creek Station (17.8630°S 141.1168°E)

== See also ==
- Normanton Airport
