= Mungana Archaeological Area =

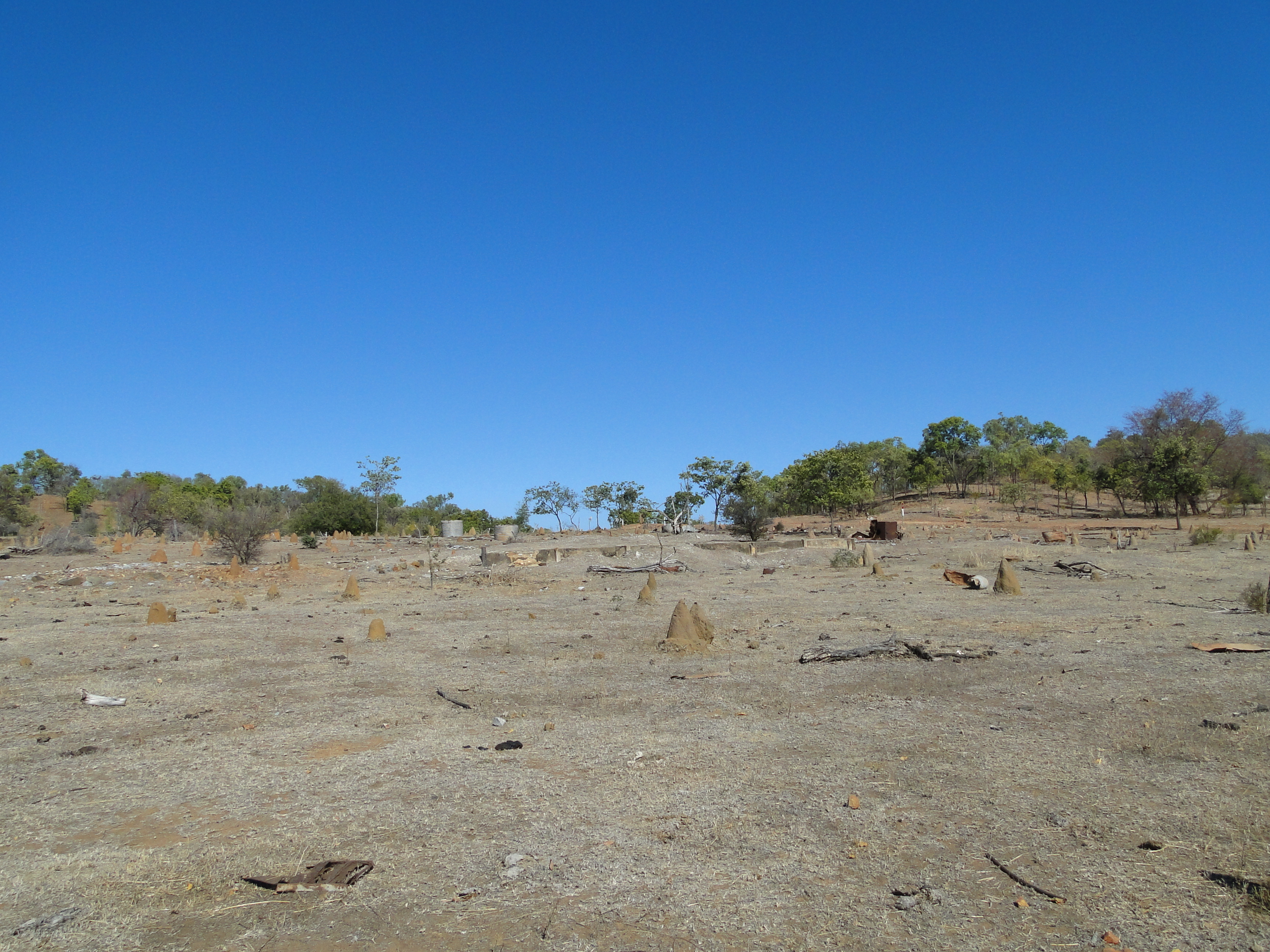
- Mungana township site

- Location within Queensland Location within Australia
- 17.1009°S 144.3929°E
- Location: Mungana, Chillagoe, Shire of Mareeba, Queensland, Australia

History
- Design period: 1870s–1890s (late 19th century)

Queensland Heritage Register
- Official name: Mungana Archaeological Area, Mungana Prospect, Old Mungana Township, Mungana Township, Lady Jane Mine, Eclipse Limeworks and Cemetery, Girofla Mine
- Type: archaeological
- Designated: 11 December 2008
- Reference no.: 700001
- Significant period: 1880s–1970s
- Significant components: artefact field

Mungana Archaeological Area is a heritage-listed former mining town at Mungana, Chillagoe, Shire of Mareeba, Queensland, Australia.It is also known as Mungana Prospect, Old Mungana Township, Mungana Township, Lady Jane Mine, Eclipse Limeworks and Cemetery, and Girofla Mine. It was added to the Queensland Heritage Register on 11 December 2008.

== History ==
The Mungana Archaeological Area is an aggregation of the remnants of mining and associated community infrastructure that commenced during Queensland's mining boom in the 1880s. The area was both geographically and commercially linked to the development of the nearby township of Chillagoe, which was originally settled and named in 1887 by William Atherton, the son of the famous North Queensland pioneer, John Atherton. William established a large homestead on the banks of the Chillagoe Creek in 1888 with the intention of supplying beef to the expanding mining operations of the area. The far north Queensland mining magnate, John Moffat, buoyed by reports from Atherton and others of the discovery of payable mineral deposits, visited the area in October 1888 and subsequently acquired the mineral rights over a considerable amount of the Chillagoe/Mungana area. He consolidated his position by establishing a number of smaller mining operations, including a smelter at Calcifer in 1894.

Mining at Mungana commenced in 1893–1894 when John Moffat employed 70 men to prospect the Girofla lode. Full scale operations commenced in 1896 when Moffat instructed 20 men to sink a shaft at Girofla, prepare a dam and construct a smelter site. A calico township quickly grew near the mine, and was also called Girofla. The settlement soon expanded to include a small number of buildings, including three hotels. By 1897 the copper smelting machinery from Muldiva had been transferred to Girofla and the latter's population had grown to 158. Although the Girofla mine was principally a lead/silver producer, the smelter also processed other ore from a series of nearby mines associated with Moffat, including the Griffith, Dorothy, Red Dome and Lady Jane.

As mining operations in the area expanded, John Moffat, and his business partner James Smith Reid, sought to restructure their holdings in an effort to establish more manageable portions and raise capital for infrastructure investment. They initially formed the Chillagoe Proprietary Company, which acquired Moffat's leases and negotiated with the colonial government. By late 1897 the Mareeba to Chillagoe Railway Act had been passed which enabled the construction of a private railway network, ensured 1,800 acres (730 ha) of mineral leases, waived labour conditions on the mines, and provided the government with the option to acquire the enterprise after fifty years. A new company was subsequently formed called the Chillagoe Railway and Mines Limited, which had a million pounds nominal capital. They then set about constructing the railway and the smelter, although the latter project encountered difficulties and was eventually located at the less preferred location of Chillagoe (Chillagoe smelters). Just as the rail network was nearing completion in 1901, Moffat and Reid floated the Mungana group of mines as a separate company; the Mungana (Chillagoe) Mining Co. Ltd. This company included the Girofla, Lady Jane, Griffith and Dorothy mines and their associated infrastructure. The completion of the railhead to Mungana in 1901 had a substantial impact upon the town. The township was moved from its original location opposite the Girofla mine to a newly surveyed site either side of the rail head, and was officially renamed Mungana. The Girofla smelter was closed in 1902 as ore could be easily railed to the new large smelting facility at Chillagoe.

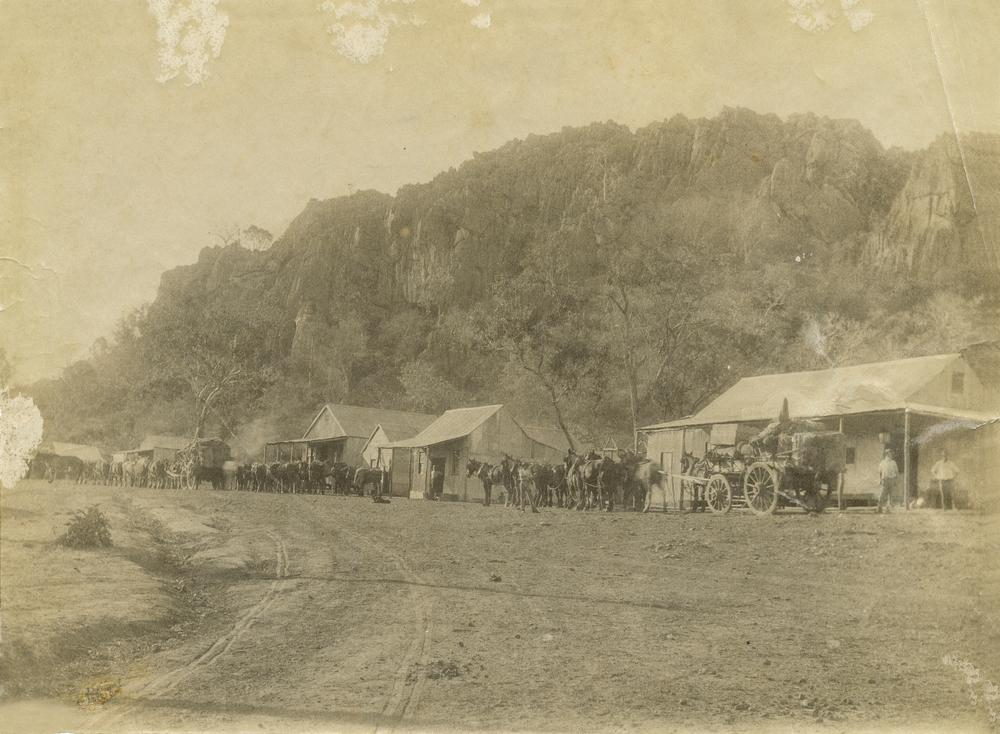
Wagon trains in the main street, Mungana, 1898

The new township of Mungana quickly grew and had a cricket club, turf club, Progress Association, court house, library and reading room. At its peak in 1920 Mungana had six hotels, three stores, bakery, butcher, confectionary shop, drapers, post office, church, school and livery.

At the railway terminus, on the southern side of the railway formation, a stone embankment was built in 1902 by the OK Copper Mines Development Syndicate NL. The OK Mine, smelter and township complex was located to the north of Mungana and made good use of the latter's new railhead. The OK Company used the siding to unloaded coke (for its smelter) and stores (for the town), and load refined copper for export. At first horses did the carrying from Mungana to OK, but in 1905 the OK Company arranged for 400 camels to take over the carriage, managed by Abdul Wade's "Bourke Carrying Company", which was also a shareholder in the OK Company. Within months Abdul Wade quickly replaced the camels with traction engines to overcome labour problems and because camels were too expensive to feed and were poisoned after eating native bushes. The six traction engines each capable of hauling eight tons cost £7,000. The embankment was still being used in 1913 after the OK smelters closed and miners had to cart the ore in to Mungana themselves for railing to the Chillagoe smelters.

Despite a series of financial scandals associated with the parent Chillagoe operation and the temporary closure of its smelters, Mungana continued to develop. The Lady Jane Mine was regarded as "promising" and in 1909 new plant was installed including a Babcock boiler. The Mungana Mining Co. installed a pumping plant at Girofla in 1911 that was one of the largest in Queensland at the time and required considerable supporting infrastructure. It consisted of a beam pump with a 39-foot (12 m) sweep, a tandem compound engine with an 18-foot (5.5 m) long crank shaft and a 9-long-ton (9.1 t) weight fly wheel 18 feet (5.5 m) in diameter. Like many of its contemporaries, Mungana had a reputation as a wild frontier township. The large number of men, physical isolation and tough living conditions resulted in frequent fights and drunkenness. In October 1901 a domestic servant named Hannah Treacy was murdered by a drunken miner, Richard Henderson, who soon after committed suicide. The offender is believed to occupy one of at least three graves rumoured to exist at the end of Main Street. A formal cemetery was established approximately two kilometres from the township in the early twentieth century, consisting of both marked and unmarked graves. The oldest known burial is dated 1904. The town racetrack was also located in this area and one of the cemetery fence posts was the fourth furlong marker.

Despite the infrastructure investments, the Mungana Co. struggled and eventually collapsed. An underground fire forced the partial closure of the Lady Jane in 1909, resulting in the loss of considerable paying ore. The entire Mungana Company went into liquidation by 1914 and all the mines closed; the Lady Jane completely filling with water. The Mungana operation was subsequently purchased by the Chillagoe Company even though it was also continuing to experience financial difficulties, and the Mungana mines remained closed until they were purchased by the Queensland Government in 1919.

Government ownership of the Mungana Mines was to represent the town's civil peak, but also made it the centre of a great political scandal. When the Labor Government took over operations in 1919, Ted Theodore was Treasurer and his close friend William McCormack was Home Secretary. Theodore and McCormack had been founding members of the Australian Workers Association (AWA), which was to merge with other labour organisations in 1913 to form the powerful Australian Workers Union. They had both been active in the Chillagoe area from 1908 onwards and succeeded in establishing branches in places such as Mungana, when earlier attempts by others had failed. In 1909 the AWA initiated industrial action at Mungana resulting in pay loading concessions by the Company. Theodore was later the Member of the Queensland Legislative Assembly for Chillagoe.

When the state purchased the mines in 1919, it reopened the Girofla and Lady Jane Mines. Fred Reid, a local miner, purchased the leases for both sites while debate about their future was being discussed in Queensland Parliament. When the purchase was settled in 1922, Reid was paid in a mixture of cash and royalties. The government also spent a considerable sum dewatering and timbering the mines. It is also believed that the extant powder magazine and detonator shed were constructed during this time.

However, in 1926 the mines again closed and accusations were made that the government had spent considerably more than originally tabled in both royalties and improvements, plus it emerged that McCormack held shares in Mungana Mines Ltd. Questions were being raised about the legality and ethics of the purchase (known as the Mungana affair) and a change of government eventually led to a Royal Commission in 1930 that was critical of Theodore, McCormack, Reid and the Chillagoe Mine Manager, Goddard. Theodore and McCormack had both served as the Queensland Premier in the years after the purchase, and Theodore had since become the Australian Treasurer. Theodore resigned as Treasurer and both he and McCormack were forced to stand trial. Although eventually cleared of fraud and conspiracy charges, the Mungana Affair ended both their political careers. The Chillagoe Smelters still provided a focus for regional mining activities; however by 1943 the dearth of payable ore and the loss of workers to World War II service finally also saw its permanent closure.

After the closure of the mines Mungana struggled on as a service centre and cattle railhead. The cattle trucking yards had been built along a separate rail siding near the town in 1901. Since the establishment of Chillagoe station by the Atherton family in 1886, cattle had been an expanding industry and the Mungana trucking yards serviced not only local producers but also stations from the Gulf and Lower Cape York Peninsula, which initially droved and later trucked their stock to the rail head. Water for stock was a constant issue, especially after the closure of the mining operations. "Underground" water tanks had been established at the yards but water had to be brought in from Smelters Junction by the locomotives and then emptied into the tanks. The yards had a Buffalo Fly spray plant installed in the late 1930s or early 1940s and the water from the tanks was used primarily for its operation. An old collapsed limestone well near the yards was cleaned out in 1949 but failed to provide a reliable source. The situation grew so desperate that the Brisbane Courier Mail reported on 29 November 1949 that cattle trucked from Mungana to Cairns had been without water for two days and the future of the practice had to be considered.

Regular rail services to Mungana ceased in 1958 and only extended beyond Chillagoe when they were required for cattle. The end of rail services was the final blow to Mungana and by 1959 it had shrunk to a hotel, store, post office and seven residents. A new metal cattle holding yard for road haulage were built in the 1970s and the old wooden cattle yards became derelict. Today the Mungana Township is completely abandoned and has become a tourism destination, although some mining leases have been recently reactivated over parts of the site and a new "drive" zinc mine is being established. The powder magazine and detonator shed are the only extant buildings but substantial remnants of the rail network, building foundations, stock trucking yards, and mining operations and cemetery survive.

In 2016, the area forms part of the Chillagoe mine project of Atherton Resources Limited.

== Description ==
The Mungana Archaeological Area consists of eight discreet areas of variable size spread over 6.5 square kilometres (2.5 sq mi).

=== Mungana Cemetery ===
Commenced in the early twentieth century and located within a gazetted reserve on the northern side of Burke Developmental Road, away from the main township. Only a small number of graves are clearly marked with headstones, but physical evidence such as remnant grave furniture and east-west aligned depressions indicate the presence of numerous other graves. The area is clearly marked with a wire and post boundary fence and the entrance gate is signed.

=== The Main Township and Cattle Yards ===
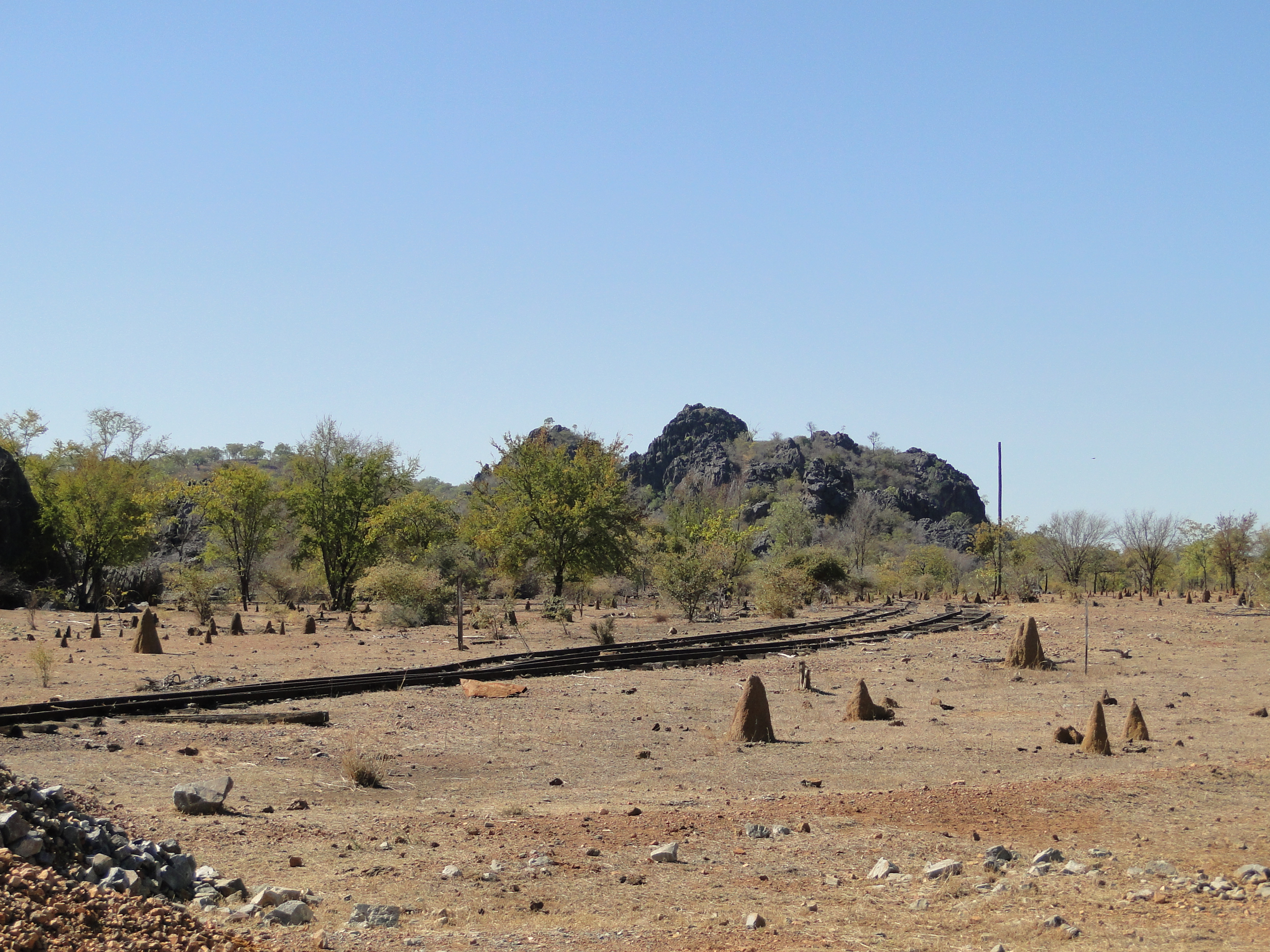
Mungana railway line

This is the largest area and is located just south of the Burke Developmental Road. It includes many features such as the Eclipse Quarry and Lime Kiln, the railway and embankment and remnants of domestic and commercial properties, the second school, the cattle railway siding and the cattle yards. The area around the town and kiln is covered in heavy vegetation in places and many historical features are obscured. The cattle yards have been damaged through termite activity, decay and fire, but the surviving hardwood fencing is still reasonably solid and can be easily read and interpreted. The site also includes the concrete spray race and a slab for a now absent building. The associated railway line is still extant as are other pieces of railway infrastructure (e.g. signal light and track changing lever). However the tracks immediately adjacent to the yards have been heavily undermined by erosion.

=== The Hospital ===
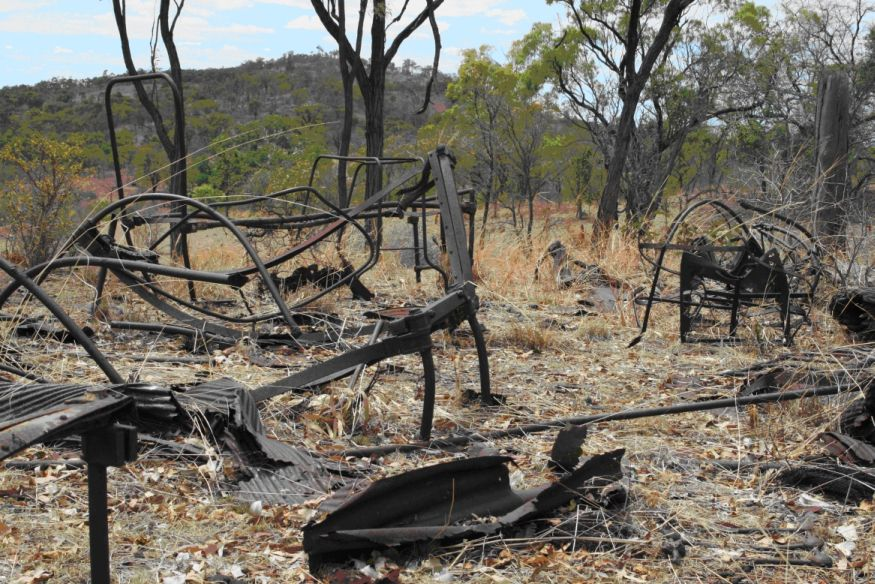
Hospital site, Mungana Archaeological Area

Located near the top of a hill to the south of the main township, remnants includes structural elements such as concrete drains and wooden posts, plus many artefacts including but not limited to bed frames, kerosene tins and a bath.

=== Girofla Mine ===
This site is located to the west of hospital and directly adjacent to the southern side of the Mungana Branch Railway Line. The site includes the main mine shaft, remnants of the pump arm, a large brick and concrete tank stand, wooden posts, numerous concrete foundations, pipes, and a riveted metal chimney that has collapsed. The geography of the area is varied and includes both natural features, such as a large limestone karst above the main shaft where machinery was established, and cultural features, such as large mullock heaps. The main shaft area is fenced off for safety reasons.

=== Girofla Smelter ===
Located to the south of the Mine and at the base of a steep ridge, this area consists of substantial foundations, a stone wall, slag spoil and domestic dwellings. The ruined domestic dwelling is located on a hill to the south of the smelter and consists of a stone foundation platform with a thin concrete slab floor. Immediately adjacent to the floor area is a large depression in the ground that probably represents a water soak. A light scattering of surface domestic artefacts are found around the house area including bottle and ceramic fragments.

=== Lady Jane Mine ===
Located to the east of the Girofla Smelter and adjacent to the southern edge of the modern access road to Red-Dome, this is another large and complex area consisting of both mining and domestic features. The large main shaft is directly adjacent to the aforementioned road and is fenced off for safety. All around the shaft are numerous mining artefacts and features including machinery foundations, metal pipes, and a tramway with remnant wooden sleepers, kerosene tins and numerous bricks/brickwork. To the south-west of the mine shaft are two ruined domestic dwellings. These are associated with light artefact scatters and the most eastern has a frangipani tree immediately adjacent to the concrete floor. This dwelling is also located near large U-shaped winding foundations made of concrete.

=== Old Mungana or Girofla Township ===
Located to the north of Lady Jane Mine on the other side of the modern road, this site consists of series of features and artefact scatters associated with the early township. Artefacts consist of ceramics and glass and date from the late nineteenth century to the mid 1930s, possibly indicating continued use of the area for a considerable period after the township moved in 1901.

=== Mungana Magazines and Access Route ===
Located within the Chillagoe Mungana Caves National Park to the north of the old Mungana/Girofla Township, this area contains the only extant buildings within the archaeological area. The two magazines are different in size and are located immediately adjacent to each other. The smaller structure measures 2,040 millimetres (80 in) width, x 2,100 millimetres (83 in) breadth x 2,270 millimetres (89 in) height and was used for housing detonators. The larger building measures 4,100 millimetres (160 in) width x 5,370 millimetres (211 in) breadth x 2,650 millimetres (104 in) height and was used for housing explosives. Both structures are of a similar design, with a corrugated iron gabled roof and whitewashed exterior walls. Both are constructed of a single course of hollow blocks, which are believed to have been handmade locally. The missing roof on the explosives magazine was replaced in 2000 with a free standing metal framed roof. The magazines are located away from the former township and behind a series of limestone karsts. Access is via a road between two of the line karsts. The road still exhibits scars from the blasting and drilling required during the construction process.

== Heritage listing ==
Mungana Archaeological Area was listed on the Queensland Heritage Register on 11 December 2008 having satisfied the following criteria.

The Mungana Archaeological Area is important in demonstrating the role of the mining industry to the development of far north Queensland and the settlement of the area by non-indigenous people. The peak in its economic life occurred with John Moffat's Chillagoe Company and the State run enterprises of the 1920s. It struggled on for another five decades serving the cattle industry in the Gulf of Carpentaria.

The former Mungana Township and railway terminus situated within the Mungana Archaeological Area are important in Queensland's history as a major development associated with the Chillagoe Mineral Field. The Mareeba to Mungana Railway line was the only successful large-scale state/private partnership in railway development between 1860 and 1900. The Girofla and lady Jane Mines were substantial operations, forming an important part in the network of mines that provided ore to the Chillagoe Smelters. The pumping plant installed at the Girofla Mine in 1911 was one of the largest of its type in Queensland at the time and represented an important attempt to deal with the ground water issues that plagued the district.

Despite extensive searches, only limited archival records concerning the activities at Mungana survive. The archaeological record of Mungana has the potential to answer a range of important research questions about Queensland's history through its material remains, especially potential for providing a rare opportunity to examine a complete community for its entire duration. All aspects of the town and mining operation survive in some form. Identifiable areas of archaeological interest include the mining infrastructure foundations and ruins, boilers, railway and tramlines, culverts, bottle dumps, domestic remains, a lime kiln, explosives stores, blasted access roads, a cemetery, a school, wells, a hospital site (including associated artefacts), cattle yards and public venues such as hotels. Artefactual material has been identified in a variety of environments throughout the area, including surface and subsurface deposits and natural depressions. Although there has been some disturbance of the site, its size and relative isolation has ensured a high degree of overall archaeological integrity.

The Mungana Archaeological Area has the potential to answer important research questions associated with how the community developed, interacted, traded and survived. Information about the history of the township and the lives of its occupants would therefore be substantially enhanced through future research. For example, preliminary archaeological analysis demonstrates that although the township of Girofla was officially moved to the current site of Mungana in 1901, artefactual evidence suggests the former continued to be occupied into the 1930s.

The Mungana Archaeological Area has the potential to answer important research questions about the collective experiences of isolated mining communities in far north Queensland in the late nineteenth and early twentieth centuries. There are many abandoned mining townships across Queensland and the far North in particular. The archaeological artefacts and potential artefact deposits within the Mungana Archaeological Area provide a strong basis for comparative analysis with other townships and mining operations, even if they are not as comprehensively preserved, to establish a better understanding of behaviour processes and industry norms in such communities.

The Mungana Archaeological Area has additional research potential to reveal important information about Queensland's history, including questions associated with gender, class, demographics, health, industry the labour movement and entertainment. Such questions could potentially be further refined in terms of the townships' periods of free enterprise and state ownership.
