= OK Mine & Smelter =

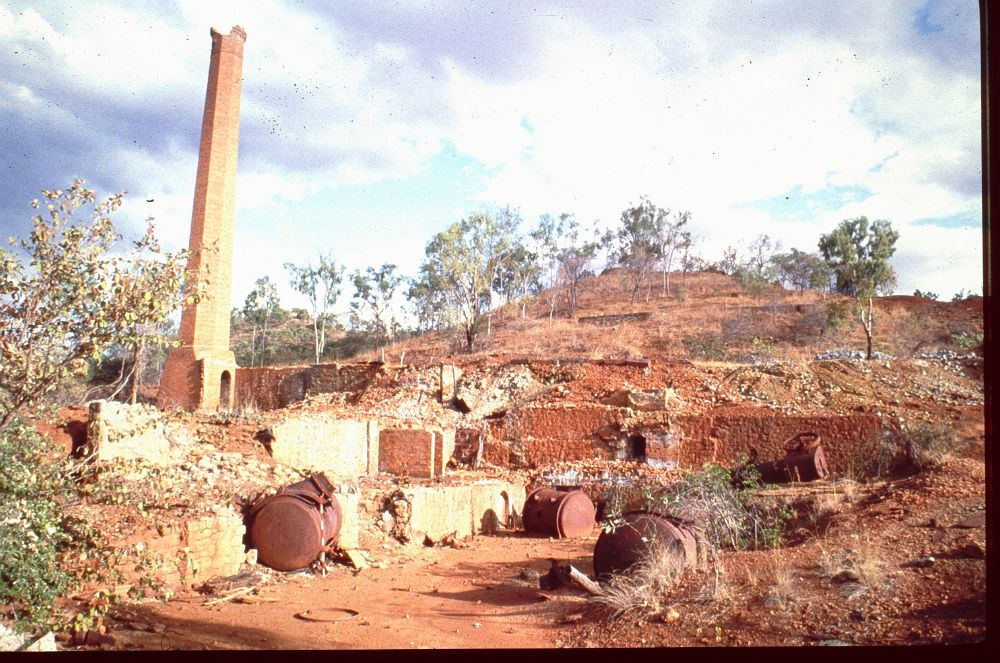
- OK Mine & Smelter, 1994

- Location within Queensland Location within Australia
- 16.6045°S 144.2463°E
- Location: Kitoba Holding, Bellevue, Shire of Mareeba, Queensland, Australia

History
- Design period: 1900 - 1914 (early 20th century)
- Built: 1902 - 1942

Queensland Heritage Register
- Official name: OK Mine & Smelter
- Type: state heritage (built, archaeological)
- Designated: 2 October 1996
- Reference no.: 601363
- Significant period: 1902-1910, 1930-1942 (fabric, historical)
- Significant components: mine - open cut, wall/s - retaining, shaft, terracing, chimney/chimney stack, mounting block/stand, track, flue, slag pile/slag heap, machinery/plant/equipment - mining/mineral processing, tank - water, weighbridge/weigh station

OK Mine & Smelter is a heritage-listed mine at Kitoba Holding, Bellevue, Shire of Mareeba, Queensland, Australia. It was built from 1902 to 1942. It was added to the Queensland Heritage Register on 2 October 1996.

== History ==
In September 1901, copper was discovered by John Munro in an area at the northern perimeter of the Chillagoe mineral district, part of the Walsh and Tinaroo Mineral Field. He named the site OK, reputedly after an empty OK jam tin. On 11 November 1902 Munro applied for a Prospecting Area of 400 square yards on a hill where copper carbonates were showing profusely and where he assayed copper at 34%.

The OK Copper Mines Development Syndicate NL was formed, consisting of members John Munro; railway contractors GC Willcocks and Acheson Overend; John Newell of Jack and Newell storekeepers; Edward Torpy, mineowner of Crooked Creek near Almaden; and CAS Andrew, civil engineer. The syndicate developed the mine and constructed and operated the OK smelters, and was the first copper company in North Queensland to declare a dividend.

Transport costs were a major obstacle for mining companies, and as the railway to nearby Mungana had recently been completed by Chillagoe Railway and Mines Limited, the OK mining venture became viable.

Chillagoe mineral lodes had attracted official attention in 1888 following a report from the Mineral Lands Commissioner that John Moffat had engaged seventy-five men to prospect some 260 acres (110 ha) of leases, and planned to finance a tramway from Montalbion to Chillagoe to redress the isolation and lack of transport. However, as copper prices were depressed and the capital market was contracting, and there was no reliable geological opinion on which to float the properties, no major development eventuated. In 1894 Moffat renewed his interest in the Chillagoe properties, and equipped two groups of mines with small furnaces. Early assays were encouraging and the Mineral Lands Commissioner predicted that with cheap transport "this will be the premier mineral producing field in Australia". In 1897 separate reports by government geologists stated that only lack of capital for mining and rail communications was retarding development.

New mining company listings on the Melbourne Stock Exchange between 1896 and 1900 were almost double those for the preceding five years, and the trend was sustained during the first decade of the twentieth century as a result of British capital flow. Many of these new mining companies failed partly because promoters tended to splurge working capital on expensive machinery, rarely assessing ore reserves with any degree of thoroughness, and partly because investors sought immediate returns on their outlays once mining was commenced. Many mines were prematurely abandoned after the surface lodes were exhausted, earning some Australian promoters notoriety for dubious financial practices. Capital investment diminished when dividends ceased, and with the exhaustion of high yield surface ores, realisation costs escalated. Many British investors sought mining debentures, the most secure form of investment. By 1914, many Australian mining ventures were British controlled as a result of under-writing capital expansion in London.

In 1897, while the Mount Lyell (Queenstown, Tasmania), Broken Hill, Mount Morgan and Western Australian mining successes were exciting Melbourne and London speculators, John Moffat, James Smith Reid and Charles William Chapman devised a grandiose scheme for the exploitation of the Chillagoe district. This scheme comprised the construction of a railway from Mareeba to Chillagoe, and the erection of central smelters and a mining programme. This required approval by the Queensland Government as existing colonial mining laws and railway policies could not countenance such a proposal. The government was lobbied, and enabling legislation entitled the Mareeba to Chillagoe Railway Bill was enacted in December 1897, after considerable opposition from Labor as it was considered a major departure from government policy. This allowed Moffat, Reid and Chapman to construct a private railway through mineral lands in return for an additional 1,800 acres (730 ha) of leases. A new company, Chillagoe Railway and Mines Limited, was formed and with a promising prospectus considerable capital was raised making it a million pounds company. In 1899, a further agreement was made with the Queensland government to construct a branch line to nearby Mount Garnet.

During this time, the Queensland Mines Department was involved in a scandal with the Admiral Sampson Chillagoe Company involving the inflation of values and projected yields. The reputation of mining companies associated with the Chillagoe district was tarnished and this resulted in heavy selling on the London sharemarket.

The railway was completed and opened in August 1901 and the smelters were geared for blowing in early the following month. However, as a result of the sharemarket uncertainty, another report was commissioned to ascertain the amount of available ore, and this stated that there was less than half of the original estimate, and of a value less than what had already been expended on the infrastructure. The company subsequently collapsed and the smelters closed down in December 1901. All the infrastructure was in place however, and a new company was floated to raise more capital to continue with the mining which recommenced by May 1902. A flush of optimism resulting from the opening up of the OK Mines on the northern perimeter of the district resulted in an increased building programme at Chillagoe and Mungana.

At first the OK Copper Mines Development Syndicate NL employed a dozen men mining the rich surface ore (37% copper) which was hauled to Mount Garnet for smelting. A road was completed to Mungana on 9 August 1902, and the first three teams departed that day with 211 long tons (214 t) of copper ore for Mungana railway station for transportation to the Mount Garnet smelters at a freight cost of £3/10/0 per ton.

The syndicate decided to establish their own smelters and acquired the Mount Garnet smelters which were part of the Mount Garnet Freehold Copper and Silver Mining Company Limited liquidation. The OK smelter cost £5,000 and commenced operations on 29 November 1904. The company built a storeroom at the Walsh River for the wet season and planned to bring winding machinery from the Palmer Goldfield in June 1904.

The smelter operated effectively though intermittently at first until all the flux and carrying arrangements were finalised. Tenders were called for the monthly carriage of 400 long tons (410 t) of matte (impure product of smelting) and ore, and back loading of 200 long tons (200 t) of coke and stores from Mungana. Tenders were also called for carrying 10 long tons (10 t) of limestone daily for 12 months. Abdul Wade, a shareholder of the company, obtained the contract for carriage to Mungana for which he used approximately 400 camels. They proved expensive, caused labour difficulties with the unions and were susceptible to the local poison bush. As a result, ten wood-burning traction engines were purchased by the company for transport to and from Mungana.

By May 1905 the company had 400 long tons (410 t) of matte ready for export. At that time they believed there were 62,360 long tons (63,360 t) of ore in sight valued at £1,060,000. In June 1905 they declared a dividend of five shillings per share, the first copper mining company in North Queensland to do so. During 1905, the company produced £61,248 worth of copper. They paid £25,308 in dividends, and expenses were £16,192 on the copper matte, £12,189 on smelting, £6,149 on ore raising, £2,922 on management expenses, £781 on general expenses and £632 on the smelting plant.

In 1906 they produced 13,687 long tons (13,907 t) of copper valued at £135,774 from the 80-and-115-foot (24 and 35 m) levels of the mine, which were still considered fairly backward in development. Two new Babcock and Wilcox boilers were bought, a new converter plant erected, new winding machinery obtained and lead frame erected. A new compressor and diamond drills were installed, and 250 men were employed.

High world metal prices in 1906–07 conferred short lived prosperity. From a high of £112 per ton in March, copper prices fell to £62 per ton in December. Manifestations of militant unionism were also emerging, with strikes over award conditions affecting mining operations.

An octagonal brick smelter chimney was erected in 1907 to improve smelter ventilation and disperse the harmful fumes. Keith Maitland-Gibson, an experienced English engineer with American experience, significantly expanded the smelter in 1907 even though the income from the copper matte declined. The lead frame was completed and the winding gear and modern mine cages were installed. A six feet by three feet water jacket furnace, Bessemerising converter of four tons capacity and flue dust chamber were added to the smelter, and boiler capacity was doubled with the smelter having a 90-ton capacity. During this time, 1,424 long tons (1,447 t) of blister (almost pure) copper were produced from 16,000 long tons (16,000 t) of ore mined, and one dividend was paid of £16,872 because of the cessation of the smelter for two months due to lack of fuel.

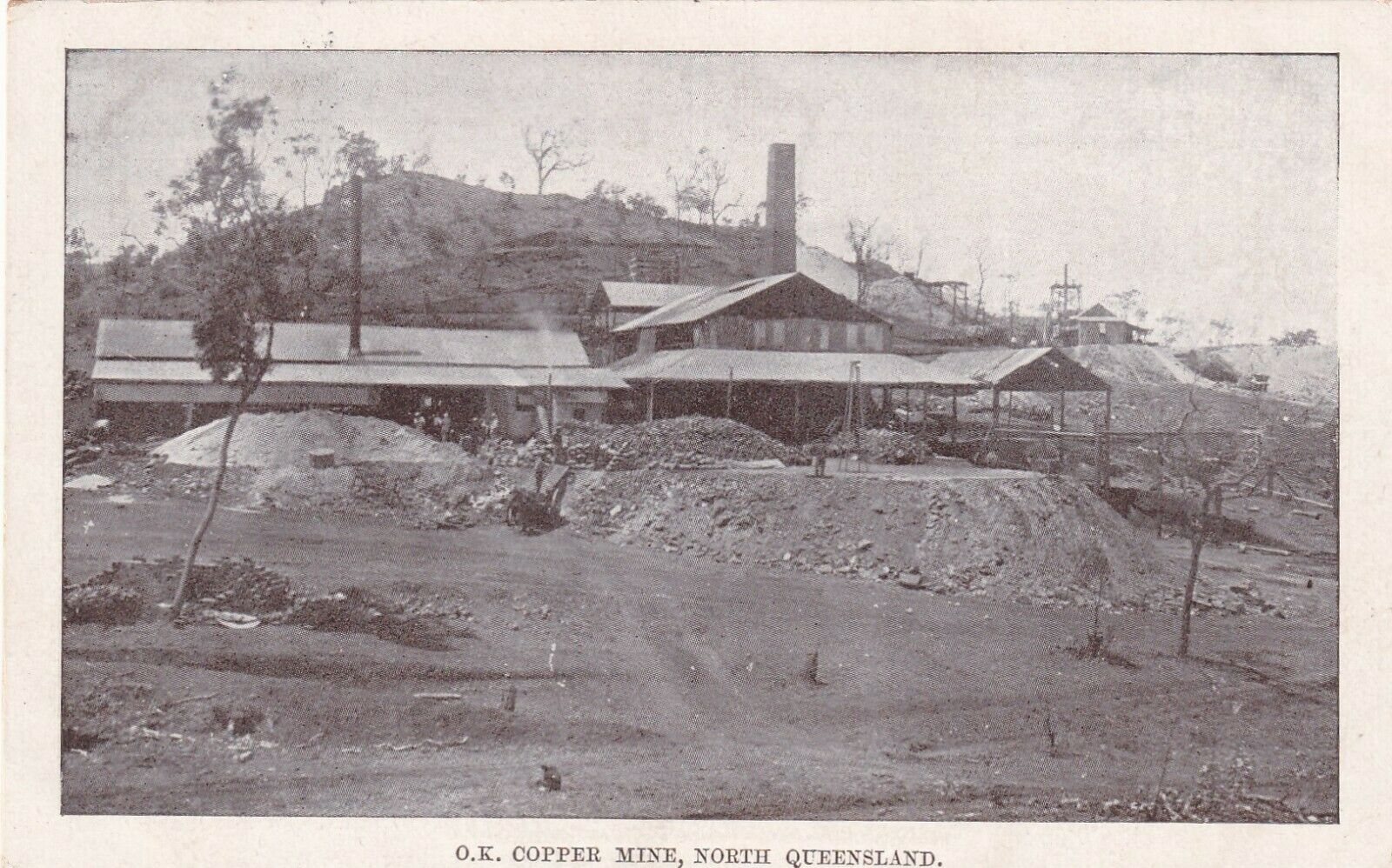
OK Copper Mine, 1908

In 1908, the company's fortunes changed. Copper quality deteriorated and no payable ore was located below 150 feet (46 m) in the mines. The output dropped to 19,970 long tons (20,290 t) of ore yielding 1,479 long tons (1,503 t) of copper. In October 1909 mining operations were suspended due to a strike, which also affected Mungana. There had also been curious stock exchange share price rigging allegations in 1905, and difference of opinion between Willcocks and the other directors over the smelter and mine manager's work. The smelters closed in June 1910, and the mine and town also closed down in the wake of a court case in the Supreme Court in Brisbane between the OK Company and Aaron Hirsch and Sons of Germany over breach of contract for the supply of copper matte. The writ had been issued for £30,000 damages, disputing the accounts of the company which had not allowed for depreciation of plant or an estimate of the ore reserves. Judgement was given for Aaron Hirsch and Sons and the OK Company was ordered to pay £19,570/5/3. The other strong reason for closing down the operations was the rapid decline in copper content of the ore. In 1909, 14,376 long tons (14,607 t) of ore were smelted for a yield of 193.5 ounces (5,490 g) of gold, 1,323 ounces (37,500 g) of silver and 752 long tons (764 t) of copper valued at a total of £46,409.

Although efforts were made to float a new company in 1912 it was unsuccessful as the mines could not be de-watered. The company offered the traction engines for sale and they were dispersed across the Atherton Tableland for use in the mining and timber industries.

The dislocation of world metal markets caused by the outbreak of hostilities in 1914, as much of the copper was contracted to German manufacturers, was overcome by the demand from the Imperial Government for munitions. Prices initially dropped until a market was found, but subsequently copper soared from £66 per ton in 1914 to £153 per ton in 1916. Four years of prosperity during the First World War, during which the Imperial government had control of the copper market, was followed by a severe slump in prices as wartime demand ceased.

Failure of mining companies to adopt new treatment methods contributed to higher realisation costs. Companies which relied on conventional methods of ore dressing by gravity mills and smelting by blast furnaces had to consider that treatment of ore with less than 10% copper content was a dubious economic proposition. Copper flotation, which had been successfully used in the United States since 1912, achieved a recovery rate 20% higher than gravity concentration, and this contributed to the recession of metal prices in the 1920s.

In 1920 a cyclone damaged the OK Mine and store buildings. A proposal to construct concentrating machinery to treat the mine dump did not eventuate, and machinery was removed from the mine and smelters for use in the Chillagoe State Smelters in 1921.

The mine opened again in 1930 supplying the Chillagoe smelters and closed in 1942 after producing 7,685 long tons (7,808 t) of copper. In 1951 the OK Syndicate erected a three head battery for trial treatment of ore.

== Description ==
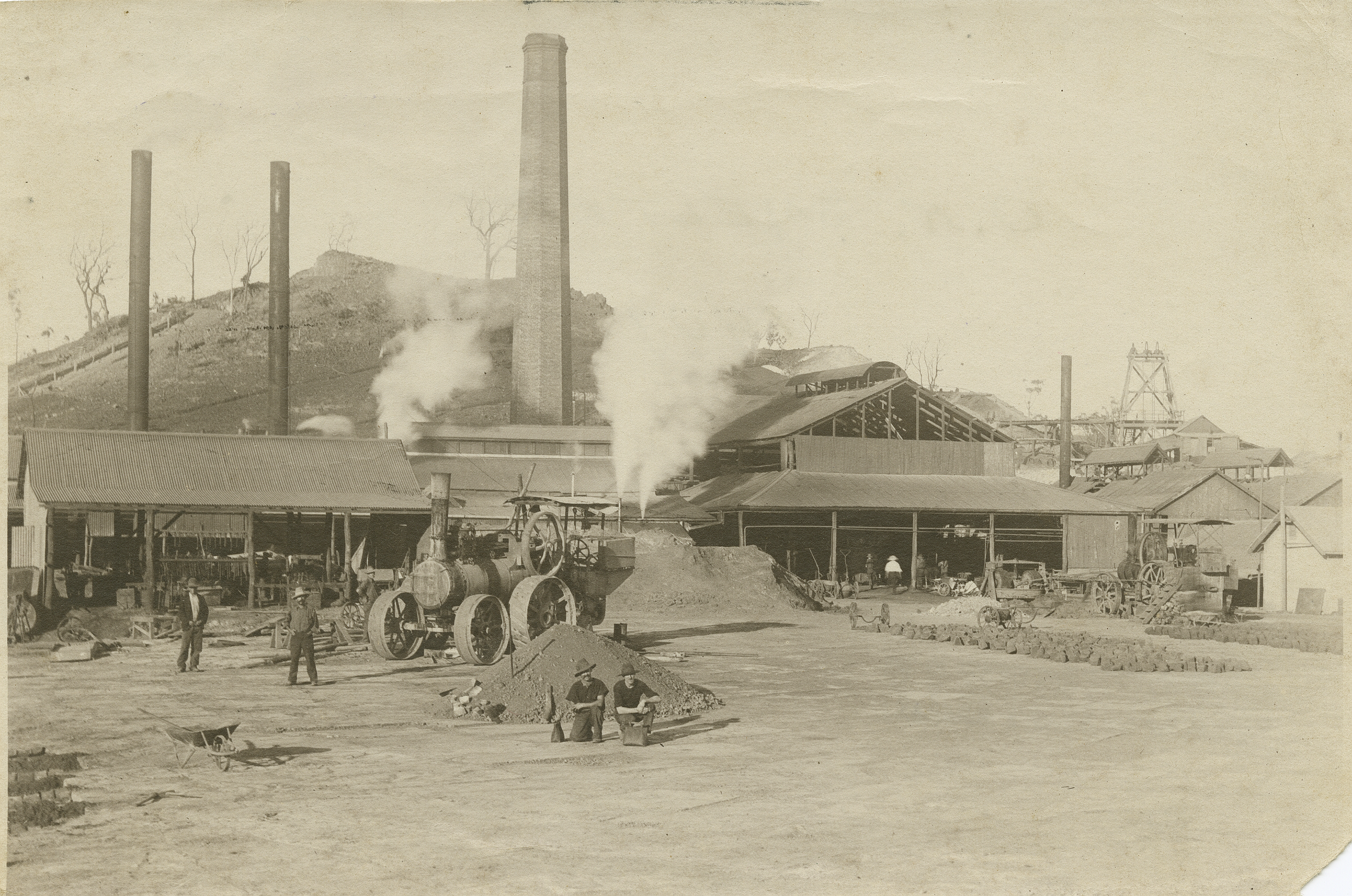
OK Copper Mine Smelters, 1907

The smelter works and associated open cut mine workings are located around the base of a small hill, on the southern side of small watercourse.

The smelter site comprises four terraces with stone retaining walls, of which there are two main levels. The lowest level, or copper floor, contains a number of items of plant including four copper converter vessels and two converter hoods, a portable steam engine and an Aveling and Porter, Rochester steam traction engine. Below the upper level, or furnace floor, there is evidence of a long brick flue leading to the tall brick chimney which is octagonal in section. The chimney stands intact with some vertical shearing of brickwork around the top, probably as a result of lightning strikes. The power house site immediately east of the chimney contains concrete engine mounts, brick boiler foundations and the brick base of a metal chimney.

A large and remarkably intact slag dump extends north of the main chimney for about 120 metres (390 ft) to a small watercourse. An intact Pooley and Sons Ltd, Birmingham and London No 524, steel weighbridge is located on a former access track on the east side of the slag dump.

The mine workings southwest of the smelter comprise a large open cut containing several mine shafts. Rendered stone water tanks are located above the smelter terraces, and a limestone deposit is located to the west.

== Heritage listing ==
OK Mine & Smelter was listed on the Queensland Heritage Register on 2 October 1996 having satisfied the following criteria.

The place is important in demonstrating the evolution or pattern of Queensland's history.

The OK Mine and Smelter is important in demonstrating the establishment and development of copper mining in North Queensland, and the Aveling and Porter steam traction engine is a monument to ore transporting problems and costs.

The place demonstrates rare, uncommon or endangered aspects of Queensland's cultural heritage.

The place demonstrates the layout and processes of a mid-sized copper smelter, and contains a rare large, intact and very symmetrical slag dump. The octagonal brick chimney dominating the smelter site is one of only three octagonal mining chimneys recorded in North Queensland, the others being at Chillagoe and Sunset No 2, Ravenswood. The Pooley and Sons weighbridge is the most substantial and intact weighbridge recorded in North Queensland.

The place is important in demonstrating the principal characteristics of a particular class of cultural places.

The place demonstrates the layout and processes of a mid-sized copper smelter, and contains a rare large, intact and very symmetrical slag dump.

The place is important because of its aesthetic significance.

As a ruin the OK Mine and Smelter, including the large symmetrical slag dump, has considerable aesthetic significance.

The place has a special association with the life or work of a particular person, group or organisation of importance in Queensland's history.

The OK Copper Mines Development Syndicate NL, which established and developed the mine and smelter, is significant in Queensland's history as the first North Queensland copper company to pay a dividend, due to its practical equating of technical requirements and expenditure on smelters and mine equipment against the known reserves of ore. No other public company on the Walsh and Tinaroo Mineral Field was able to achieve this.
