= Arbouin, Queensland =

Arbouin
- Suburb
- Interactive map of Arbouin
- Coordinates: 17.0841°S 143.9808°E
- Country: Australia
- State: Queensland
- LGA: Shire of Mareeba
- Location: 73.8 km (45.9 mi) WNW of Chillagoe; 215 km (134 mi) W of Mareeba; 278 km (173 mi) W of Cairns; 586 km (364 mi) NW of Townsville; 1,901 km (1,181 mi) NNW of Brisbane

Government
  - State electorate: Cook
  - Federal division: Kennedy

Area
  - Total: 1,061.2 km^{2} (409.7 sq mi)

Population
  - Total: 0 (2021 census)
  - Density: 0.0000/km^{2} (0.0000/sq mi)
- Time zone: UTC+10:00 (AEST)
- Postcode: 4871
Suburbs around Arbouin
Lyndside	Wrotham	Rookwood
Lyndside	Arbouin	Rookwood
Lyndside	Bolwarra	Crystalbrook

Arbouin is a rural locality in the Shire of Mareeba, Queensland, Australia. In the 2021 census, Arbouin had "no people or a very low population".

== Geography ==
The Walsh River flows through the north-east corner from east to north.

== Demographics ==
In the 2016 census, Arbouin had "no people or a very low population".

In the 2021 census, Arbouin had "no people or a very low population".

== Education ==
There are no schools in Arbouin. The nearest government primary school is Chillagoe State School in Chillagoe to the east; however, it would be too distant for some students for a daily commute. Also there are no nearby secondary schools. The alternatives are distance education and boarding school.
