= Wrotham, Queensland =

Wrotham
- Suburb
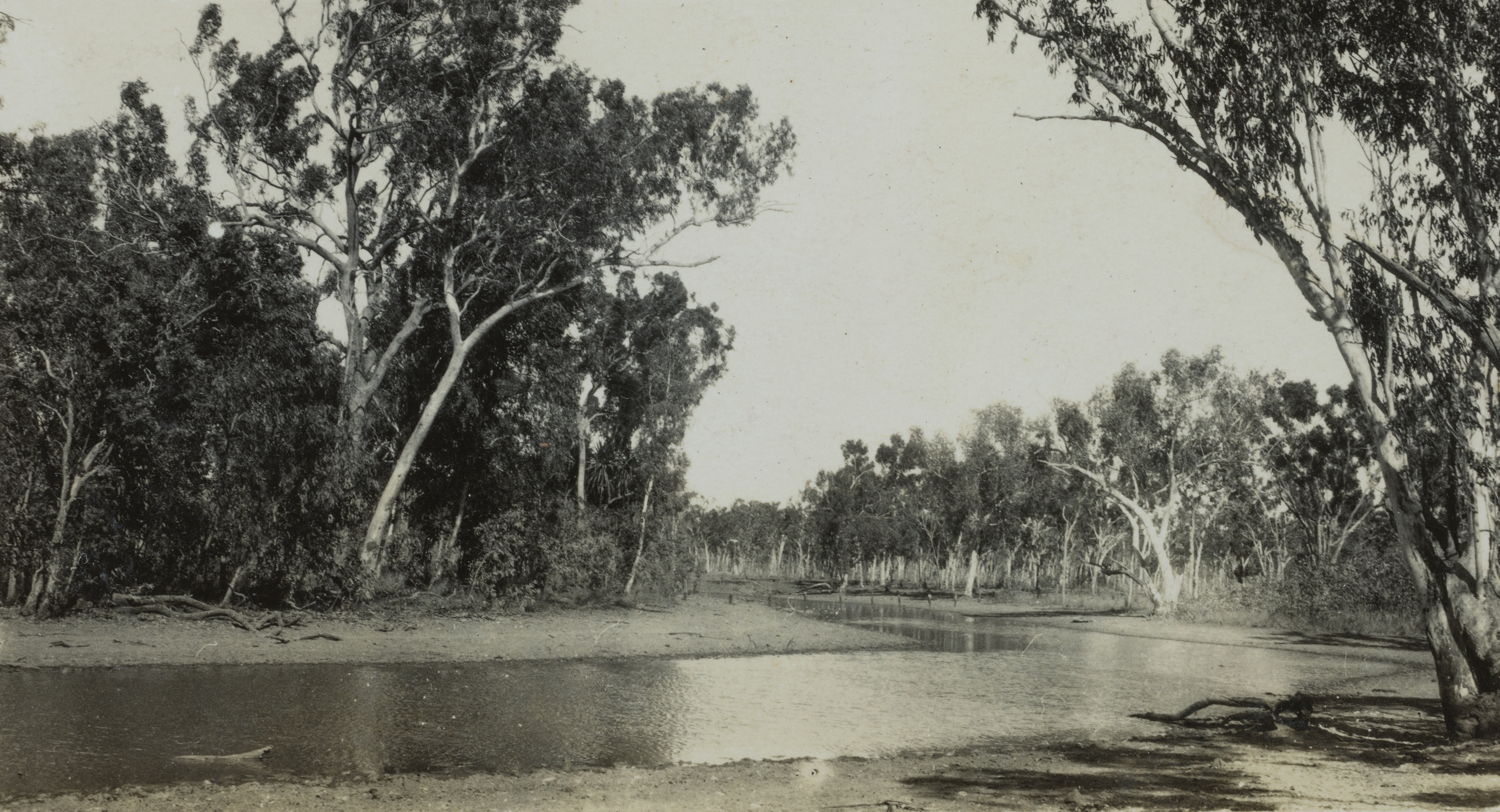
- Bend in the river at Wrotham Park

- Interactive map of Wrotham
- Coordinates: 16.6580°S 143.9111°E
- Country: Australia
- State: Queensland
- LGA: Shire of Mareeba
- Location: 88.3 km (54.9 mi) NNW of Chillagoe; 225 km (140 mi) NW of Mareeba; 287 km (178 mi) WNW of Cairns; 1,910 km (1,190 mi) NNW of Brisbane

Government
  - State electorate: Cook
  - Federal division: Kennedy

Area
  - Total: 2,009.3 km^{2} (775.8 sq mi)

Population
  - Total: 27 (2021 census)
  - Density: 0.01344/km^{2} (0.0348/sq mi)
- Time zone: UTC+10:00 (AEST)
- Postcode: 4871
Suburbs around Wrotham
Gamboola	Mount Mulgrave	Mount Mulgrave
Gamboola	Wrotham	Bellevue
Lyndside	Arbouin	Rookwood

Wrotham is a rural locality in the Shire of Mareeba, Queensland, Australia. In the 2021 census, Wrotham had a population of 27 people.

== Geography ==
The Mitchell River forms the northern boundary. The Walsh River flows through from the south to the north-west corner, where it joins the Mitchell.

The Burke Developmental Road (State Route 27) enters the locality from the west (Gamboola) and exits to the east (Bellevue).

The locality's boundaries are also the boundaries of the Wrotham Park Station, a cattle station owned by Consolidated Pastoral Company, where the land use is grazing on native vegetation.

== History ==
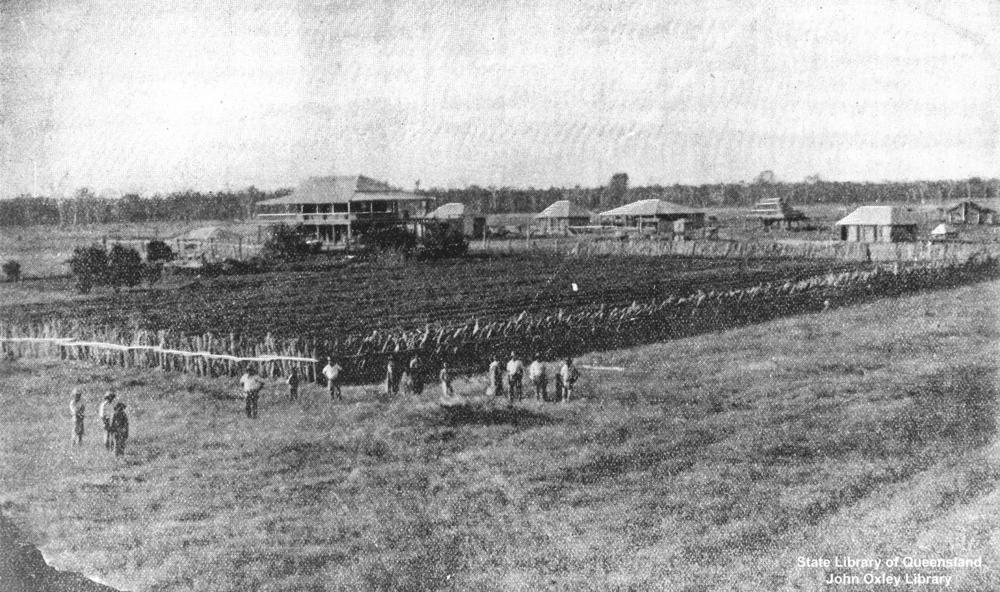
Wrotham Park homestead, 1906

In 1874, Alexander Charles Grant (1843–1930) was involved in establishing Wrotham Park pastoral station on the Mitchell River in 1874. The meat was sold on the Normanby and Palmer goldfields. However, unable to establish a wholesale distribution arrangement and having contracted malaria, he sold his share of Wrotham Park in 1878.

== Demographics ==
In the 2016 census, Wrotham had "no people or a very low population".

In the 2021 census, Wrotham had a population of 27 people.

== Transportation ==
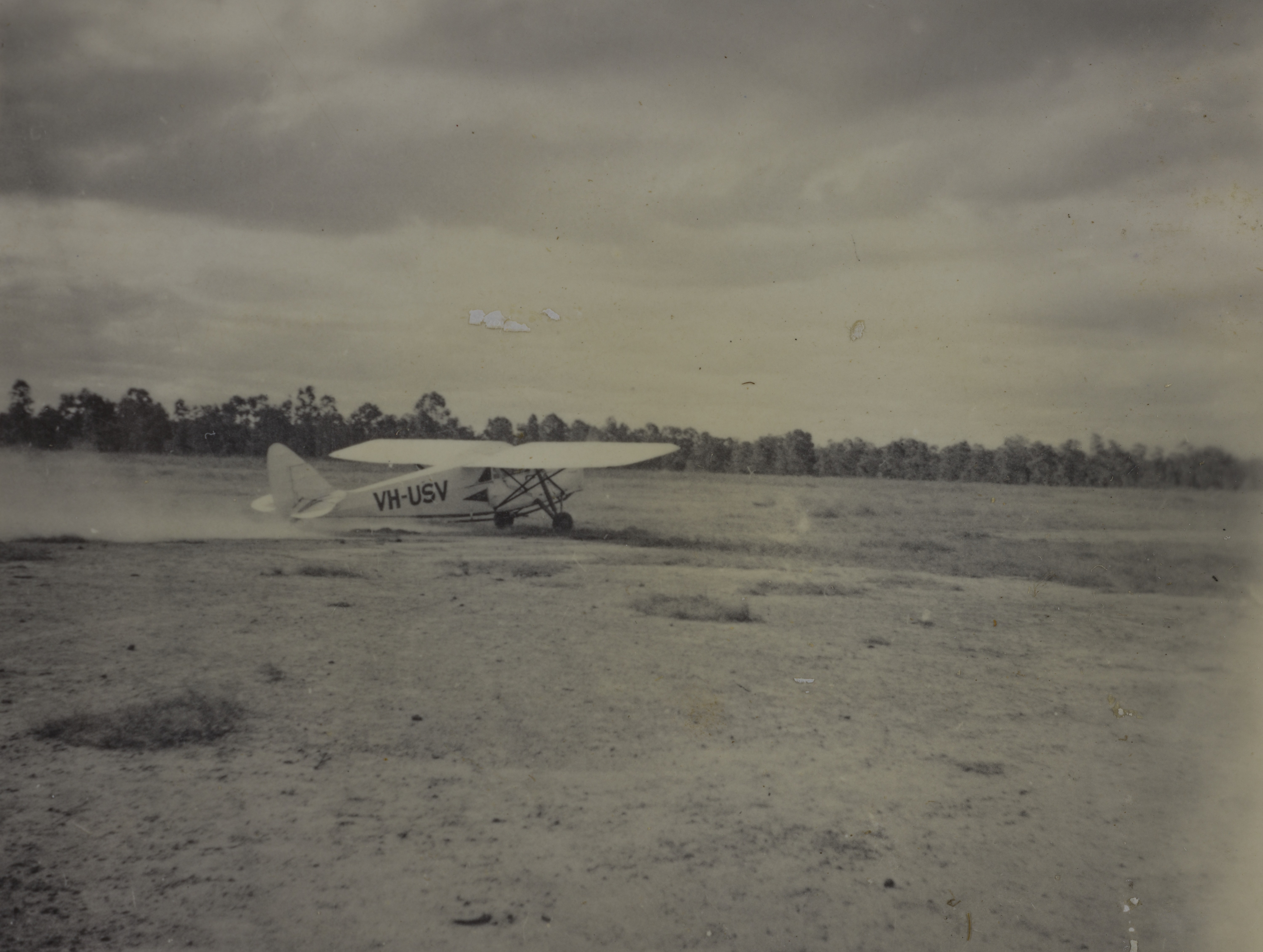
North Queensland Airways plane taking off at Wrotham Park Station airstrip, 1936

The Wrotham Park Airport (IATA: WPK, ICAO: YWMP) is at the homestead on the Burke Developmental Road (16.65855°S 144.00020°E). It has a 3,000-foot (910 m) runway.

== Education ==
There are no schools in Wrotham nor nearby. The alternatives are distance education and boarding school.
