= Shire of Walsh =

Local government area in Queensland, Australia

Coordinates: 17.4283°S 145.2042°E

The Shire of Walsh was a local government area in Far North Queensland, Australia, located to the south-west of the town Cairns.

== History ==
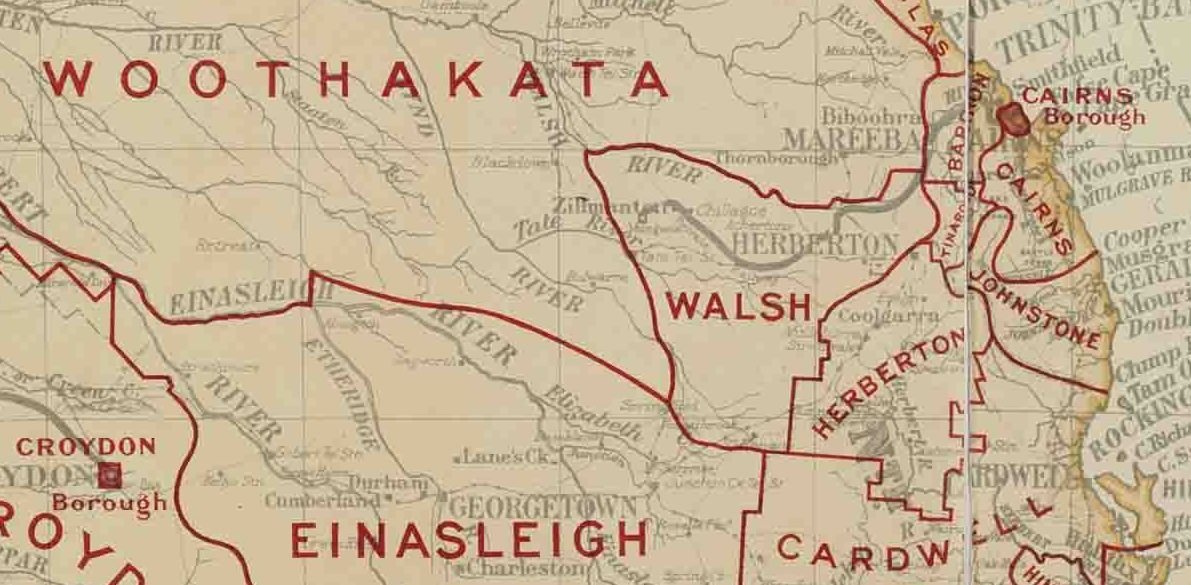
Map of Walsh Division and adjacent local government areas, March 1902

The Woothakata Division, based in the mining town of Thornborough on the Hodginson goldfield, was created on 11 November 1879 as one of 74 divisions around Queensland under the Divisional Boards Act 1879.

On 15 May 1889, the tin-mining area at Stannary Hills and Irvinebank and its hinterland in and around the Walsh River (an area of 4110 sq miles) were severed from Woothakata Division to create Walsh Division. It takes its name from the Walsh River, which, in turn, was named after William Henry Walsh, a pastoralist and the Queensland Parliamentary Secretary for Public Works (1870–1873).

With the passage of the Local Authorities Act 1902, the Walsh Division became the Shire of Walsh on 31 March 1903.

On 16 December 1908, a small part of Shire of Woothakata was transferred to the Shire of Walsh, which was then split with one part being proclaimed the new Shire of Chillagoe, based at Chillagoe.

In 1927, the offices of the Walsh Shire were in Irvinebank.

On 25 June 1932, the Shires of Walsh and Chillagoe merged into the Shire of Woothakata, which was renamed the Shire of Mareeba on 20 December 1947.

== Chairmen ==
- 1897: S. Bennett
- 1908: Thomas Martin Delugar
- 1927: J. O'Keefe
