= Anglo Saxon Mine =

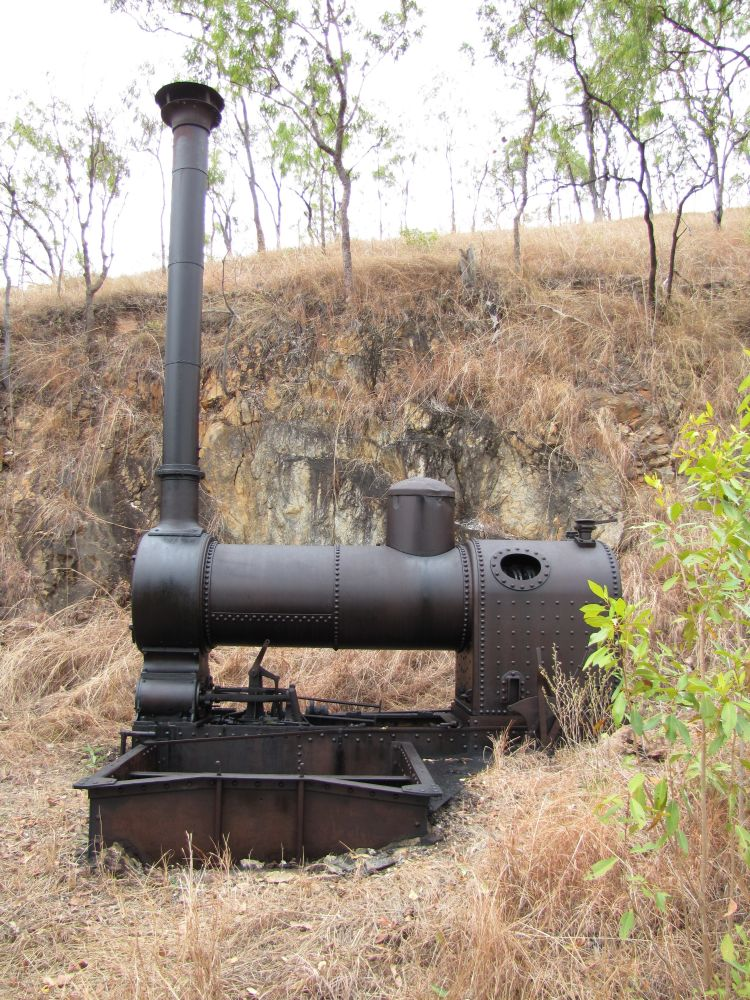
- Robey undertype semi-portable steam engine at the Anglo Saxon Mine, 2011

- Location within Queensland Location within Australia
- 16.4042°S 144.3265°E
- Location: Groganville, Shire of Mareeba, Queensland, Australia

History
- Design period: 1870s–1890s (late 19th century)
- Built: 1886–1897

Queensland Heritage Register
- Official name: Anglo Saxon Mine and Groganville Township, Limestone Cemetery
- Type: state heritage (archaeological)
- Designated: 3 October 2003
- Reference no.: 600982
- Significant period: 1886-1897 (historical)
- Significant components: terracing, mullock heap, embankment – tramway, oven, embankment – road, cemetery, wall/s - retaining, objects (movable) – mining/mineral processing, mine – open cut, shaft

Anglo Saxon Mine is a heritage-listed mining camp at Groganville, Shire of Mareeba, Queensland, Australia. It was built from 1886 to 1897. It is also known as Groganville Township and Limestone Cemetery. It was added to the Queensland Heritage Register on 3 October 2003.

== History ==
The Anglo-Saxon Mine and Groganville Township, situated just south of what was known as the Palmer River Goldfield Reserve, was founded after prospector Harry Harbord located the rich Anglo-Saxon Reef at the head of Limestone Creek in 1886. The discovery came at a time when the output of gold in the Maytown/Palmer district to the north was waning. The discovery of the Anglo-Saxon reef instigated the last big rush on the Palmer River Goldfield before the hey-day of gold discoveries began to wind-down all over North Queensland.

The first reports of gold in the Palmer River area were made after the return of an exploration party led by William Hann in August 1872. It was not until James Venture Mulligan and party returned in mid 1873 with cautious, but nonetheless optimistic reports of payable claims, that the Palmer rush started. A rush of some 20,000 miners followed soon after, including a substantial influx of Chinese miners into Northern Australia.

Alluvial practices dominated mining in the Palmer River area during the first few years of the rush. During this period the goldfield became a prime example of the sort of transient settlements which were the result of alluvial gold mining and which were a major feature of North Queensland settlement patterns until the 1930s. The Palmer, archetype of alluvial goldfields, produced nearly a million ounces of alluvial gold in five years from 1873 sparking a monumental population movement into an area far beyond previous European settlement.

In the late 1870s, efforts to extract the maximum profits from the Palmer River Goldfields led to the introduction of reef mining processes into the area. Reef mining involved the working of surface deposits and if the results warranted it, the sinking of deep shafts. Such activities required additional equipment such as boilers, pumps and winding equipment, and well organised transportation infrastructure. As Grimwade notes:

For the most part the reef mines were to be the mainstay of Palmer gold. Their bulk, their remote locations and their continuing existence, in albeit varying states of repair, are seen as fitting monuments to the early mines of the region as are the extensive stone pitched waterways and channels of the alluvial miners scattered widely through a harsh but challenging environment. Only three principal quartz reefs were located in the area with reef mining activity principally concentrated within the southern catchment of the North Palmer River and south to the Palmer itself. There were a few notable exceptions further south, including the spasmodically operated Alexandra Mine near Dog Leg Creek and "the productive and well preserved Anglo-Saxon Mine north of Groganville".

Contrary to the transient development effects of alluvial mining, reef mining led to the development of more stable settlements. Charters Towers, with a peak population of 30,000 in 1900 was the most important, with Croydon, Ravenswood and Etheridge making up the bulk of other underground gold production.

The significance of gold mining to the development of Queensland in the late 19th century, both economically and geographically, cannot be underestimated. Blainey has pointed-out that in half the years from 1873 to 1906 Queensland's exports of gold and metals exceeded wool and the impact of gold on Queensland's growth was powerful. The ports of Townsville, Cairns and Cooktown were made or magnified by mining fields, and the whole colony was invigorated by the web of commerce spun by gold. The total value of gold produced in Queensland to 1898 was £44,499,955 compared with tin £4,448,800, copper £2,022,927, and silver £697,418. Gold did more to bring Europeans to Queensland and to establish white settlement in Queensland's tropics than any pastoral or agricultural product ever did. The placing of towns, ports and railways is a legacy of the early history of mining in a colony that once wanted a single substantial field.

After Harbord's 1886 discovery of the Anglo-Saxon Reef, the extremely rich initial ore sample gave 300 ounces (8,500 g) of gold to the ton of rock, making the Anglo-Saxon Reef the richest reef on the north Queensland goldfields at this time. Harbord floated a company, the Anglo-Saxon Gold Syndicate, in England in 1887, based on the analysis of the initial stone collected at Limestone creek. In 1888 the Anglo-Saxon started crushing. After the first year, the February tally was 1, 175 ounces (5,000 g) of gold.

By 1889 nearly fifty men were employed by the Anglo-Saxon Gold Syndicate - miners were paid £4 per week, blacksmiths, engine drivers and carpenters all earned more. Cartage to Cooktown was £25 per ton. It cost £8/4/0 to raise and crush 2,308 long tons (2,345 t) of ore which averaged 5.5 ounces (160 g) of gold per ton. The company made good dividends of 14 shillings on every £6 which was remarkable for a gold mine in such a remote area.

There was a haulage road for carts, surveyed by John J. Davis in 1889, from the Anglo Saxon mine to the Harbord battery. The track climbs away from the mine across a spur, then between deep gullies and into a cutting along the face of the high country then down to the battery at Harbord. According to official records, the Anglo Saxon reef yielded a total of 30,892 ounces (875,800 g) of bullion, or almost one third of the total production of all of the Maytown/Palmer reefs.

The mine was said to have produced dividends of £30,000 before expenses became too high. A shaft was sunk, hoisting machinery purchased and a tramway laid from the mine to the Harbord battery, (this tramway was listed on the Register of the National Estate) the old system of carting quartz by drays having been found to be very expensive. The quartz was then run from the mine face into iron trucks, the same trucks placed on the safety cage and hoisted to the surface where the quartz was tipped into hoppers, and run into large iron trucks each holding 30cwt. One man took two of the trucks (or three tons at a time) down to the battery. The mine continued to operate during the 1890s depression but the area was abandoned by 1897.

The township of Groganville, also known as Limestone, was surveyed in May 1889 by John J. Davies and was named after Patrick Grogan who had the first butcher shop on the field. Businesses and dwellings soon started appearing on the steep banks of the Limestone Creek gully. Sites had to be excavated from the hillside to create a flat platform on which to build. Retaining walls were constructed by hand with local rock and gravel, and in one case a retaining wall was constructed from beer bottles.

By 1890 there was a school, Post Office, Bank of North Queensland, Limestone Hospital, 3 or 4 pubs and a butchers shop. A mill site was erected on the northern bank of Limestone Creek about 2 kilometres (1.2 mi) from the mine.

Patrick Grogan operated a hotel at Groganville from about 1890. In July 1890 there was a population of 500 and seven hotels, eight stores, two bakers, a butcher, two cordial factories, a bank, post office, news office, blacksmith, billiard room, reading room, chemist, doctor, police and a mining warden. There were 300 men and 27 women at a Hospital Ball in May 1890 and a School Ball in August 1890.

In November 1890, 200 people attended a public meeting to protest against Chinese mining, while six sly grog sellers were fined in court. In December a Roman Catholic priest visited to conduct marriages and christenings. In April 1891 the school and telegraph office opened and the Chinese erected a second temple near the school.

Unlike the spectacularly successfully reef mining towns of Charters Towers and Ravenswood, Groganville Township did not prosper after its gold-rush had ended. This was in part due to the sheer isolation of its location, meaning transportation was difficult and costly, and also due to the impoverished soils of the district which were unsuitable for widespread agriculture and did little to enhance the development of permanent towns. By the end of 1891 the seven hotels had reduced to two, and by the turn of the century the town was abandoned. Patrick Grogan moved to Thornborough and established the Royal Hotel in 1897, and by 1914, he had acquired interests in the new township of Mount Mulligan. However the remains of the mine, the township and the cemetery act as an important and legible physical document of how such a mining settlement developed and operated in late 19th tropical Queensland and of the ingenuity of the miners and the inhabitants who settled the site. It is representative of a widespread phenomenon that will never be repeated in the evolution of Queensland's history.

== Description ==
The Anglo Saxon mine occupies a narrow terrace reached by a narrower access track cut into the western side of a steep hill spur. A gully at the base of the spur that extends south contains a number of building surfaces and associated building remains, stone retaining walls and small mine workings which may have been associated with the mine's manager's house and mine camp.

Ore tramway formations extend east, and northwest of the mine to Harbord battery. The main components of the mine terrace are a concrete collared shaft equipped with a pump arm, and a semi-portable steam engine. The semi-portable is a rare undertype engine equipped with a winding plant base. The winding drums have been removed. The Palmer River Historic Preservation Society has periodically coated the engine with oil to help with preservation. A second portable engine and a flywheel have been pushed over the side of the terrace. An extensive mullock dump descends down the hill from two shafts that have been stoped out into open cut workings.

Surviving plant includes:

- Semi-portable steam engine - no brand. (Robey undertype semi- portable engine with self-contained winching plant base)
- Two-cylinder (overtype) portable steam engine - no brand
- Pump arm.

== Heritage listing ==
Anglo Saxon Mine and Groganville Township was listed on the Queensland Heritage Register on 3 October 2003 having satisfied the following criteria.

The place is important in demonstrating the evolution or pattern of Queensland's history.

The Anglo Saxon Mine and Groganville Township are important in demonstrating the evolution of the gold-mining industry in Queensland in the late 19th century. The Anglo-Saxon reef was one of the richest producers on the Palmer River Goldfield during its short life from 1886 to 1897. Gold production was a powerful economic driver in Queensland from the 1870s through to the turn of the century and it is argued the discovery of major gold fields in central and northern Queensland saved the floundering colony from near bankruptcy. Gold mining in north Queensland also affected the patterns of settlement and the development of towns and port cities in the northern part of the colony that persist today. The remnants of a settlement like the Anglo Saxon Mine and Groganville Township bears testament to a once thriving community, supported solely by gold production that foundered when available gold veins were exhausted. It is representative of a pattern of desertion common throughout Queensland gold-mining towns at this time.

The place demonstrates rare, uncommon or endangered aspects of Queensland's cultural heritage.

The Anglo Saxon mine area provides evidence of reef mining, a practice uncommon south of the Palmer River. Reef mining involved the working of surface deposits and if the results warranted it, the sinking of deep shafts. Such activities required additional equipment such as boilers, pumps and winding equipment. Examples of this machinery remain in situ at the Anglo Saxon Mine including a rare and intact Robey undertype semi-portable steam engine probably dating to the 1880s. This is the most intact undertype engine recorded on a Queensland mining site. The occupation remains at Groganville Township are relatively undisturbed and include rare and endangered elements of Queensland's cultural heritage and are unique to the mining settlements of the late 19th century north Queensland. Examples include the numerous habitation floors excavated into the hillside and found along the high creek banks of Limestone Creek, including one platform reinforced with a rare early beer bottle retaining wall.

The place has potential to yield information that will contribute to an understanding of Queensland's history.

The Anglo Saxon Mine and Groganville Township represent a place with potential to yield information that will contribute to the understanding of north Queensland's gold-mining industry in the late 19th century. The gully from the mine south through Groganville Township to the Limestone Cemetery is a well-preserved cultural landscape and a rare example of an archaeologically intact group of habitation sites and associated occupation debris. The place had a brief habitation span and the archaeological remains provide a "snap-shot" into life in the Limestone district during the late 19th century. Extensive archaeological materials are extant on the surface and remain largely undisturbed. The potential for stratified archaeological deposits is however, assessed as low due to the rugged nature of the terrain and short occupation period. The high integrity of the remaining features provides future researchers with a potentially valuable resource for investigating the undocumented aspects of everyday life in the Limestone district during what was an important period in the history of north Queensland.

The place is important in demonstrating the principal characteristics of a particular class of cultural places.

The Anglo Saxon mine area provides evidence of reef mining, a practice uncommon south of the Palmer River. Reef mining involved the working of surface deposits and if the results warranted it, the sinking of deep shafts. Such activities required additional equipment such as boilers, pumps and winding equipment. Examples of this machinery remain in situ at the Anglo Saxon Mine including a rare and intact Robey undertype semi-portable steam engine probably dating to the 1880s. This is the most intact undertype engine recorded on a Queensland mining site.

The place is important because of its aesthetic significance.

Anglo-Saxon Mine and Groganville Township and the Limestone Cemetery form a cultural landscape with high aesthetic value relying on the combination of large-scale remnants of mining infrastructure, smaller remnants of the human settlement such as stone retaining walls and the typically picturesque style of the 19th century cemetery with ornate stone headstones all set in a rugged bush setting against steep hills and valleys also complemented by a fresh water creek.

The place is important in demonstrating a high degree of creative or technical achievement at a particular period.

The construction of a substantial tramway system linking Anglo Saxon Mine and the ore processing battery at nearby Harbord, demonstrates the technological developments in mining transportation and infrastructure made during the late 19th century. The presence of this route, designed to supersede the existing overland cart route and cut through solid rock and traversing treacherous terrain, provides a testament to the resourcefulness, skill and dedication of the miners at the Anglo Saxon Mine and of the wider inhabitants of the Limestone District.

== See also ==
- List of tramways in Queensland
