= Lyndside, Queensland =

Lyndside
- Suburb
- Interactive map of Lyndside
- Coordinates: 16.9166°S 143.6275°E
- Country: Australia
- State: Queensland
- LGA: Shire of Mareeba
- Location: 130 km (81 mi) WNW of Chillagoe; 271 km (168 mi) W of Mareeba; 334 km (208 mi) W of Cairns; 642 km (399 mi) NW of Townsville; 1,957 km (1,216 mi) NNW of Brisbane

Government
  - State electorate: Cook
  - Federal division: Kennedy

Area
  - Total: 2,829.7 km^{2} (1,092.6 sq mi)

Population
  - Total: 0 (2021 census)
  - Density: 0.00000/km^{2} (0.0000/sq mi)
- Time zone: UTC+10:00 (AEST)
- Postcode: 4871
Suburbs around Lyndside
Gamboola	Gamboola	Wrotham
Staaten	Lyndside	Arbouin
Strathmore	Ravensworth	Bolwarra

Lyndside is a rural locality in the Shire of Mareeba, Queensland, Australia. In the 2021 census, Lyndside had "no people or a very low population".

== Geography ==
The Lynd River flows through from south to north, where it forms part of the north-eastern boundary.

== Demographics ==
In the 2016 census, Lyndside had "no people or a very low population".

In the 2021 census, Lyndside had "no people or a very low population".

== Education ==
There are no schools in Lyndside, nor nearby. The alternatives are distance education and boarding school.
