= Chillagoe-Mungana Caves National Park =

National park in Queensland Australia

- IUCN category II (national park)
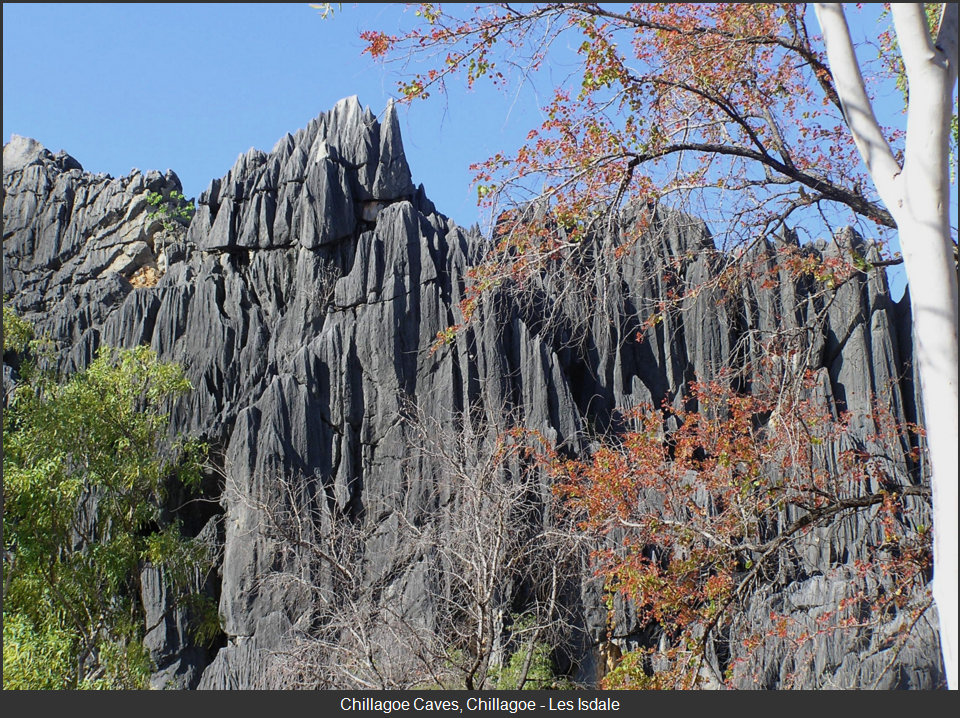
- Chillagoe Caves, 2020

- Location within Queensland
- Location: Queensland
- Nearest city: Chillagoe
- Coordinates: 17°05′30″S 144°23′35″E
- Area: 36.9 km^{2} (14.2 sq mi)
- Established: 1995
- Governing body: Queensland Parks and Wildlife Service
- Website: http://www.nprsr.qld.gov.au/parks/chillagoe-caves/

Chillagoe-Mungana Caves is a national park in Chillagoe, Shire of Mareeba, Queensland, Australia.

== Geography ==
The park is 1,455 kilometres (904 mi) northwest of Brisbane. The elevation of the terrain is 409 metres.

The park is located within the Walsh River catchment area and the Einasleigh Uplands bioregion. A total of 10 rare or threatened species have been recorded in the park. Of these, 5 are mammals, diadem leaf-nosed bat, greater large-eared horseshoe bat, ghost bat, spectacled flying-fox and koala.

== Facilities ==
There are several self-guided limestone caves, the Archways, Pompeii cave, and Bauhinia cave. The historic Chillagoe smelters area has mining relics from the 1890s. There are a few small rock galleries of Indigenous Australian art.

Camping is not permitted.

== See also ==
- Protected areas of Queensland
