= Mount Mulgrave, Queensland =

Mount Mulgrave
- Suburb
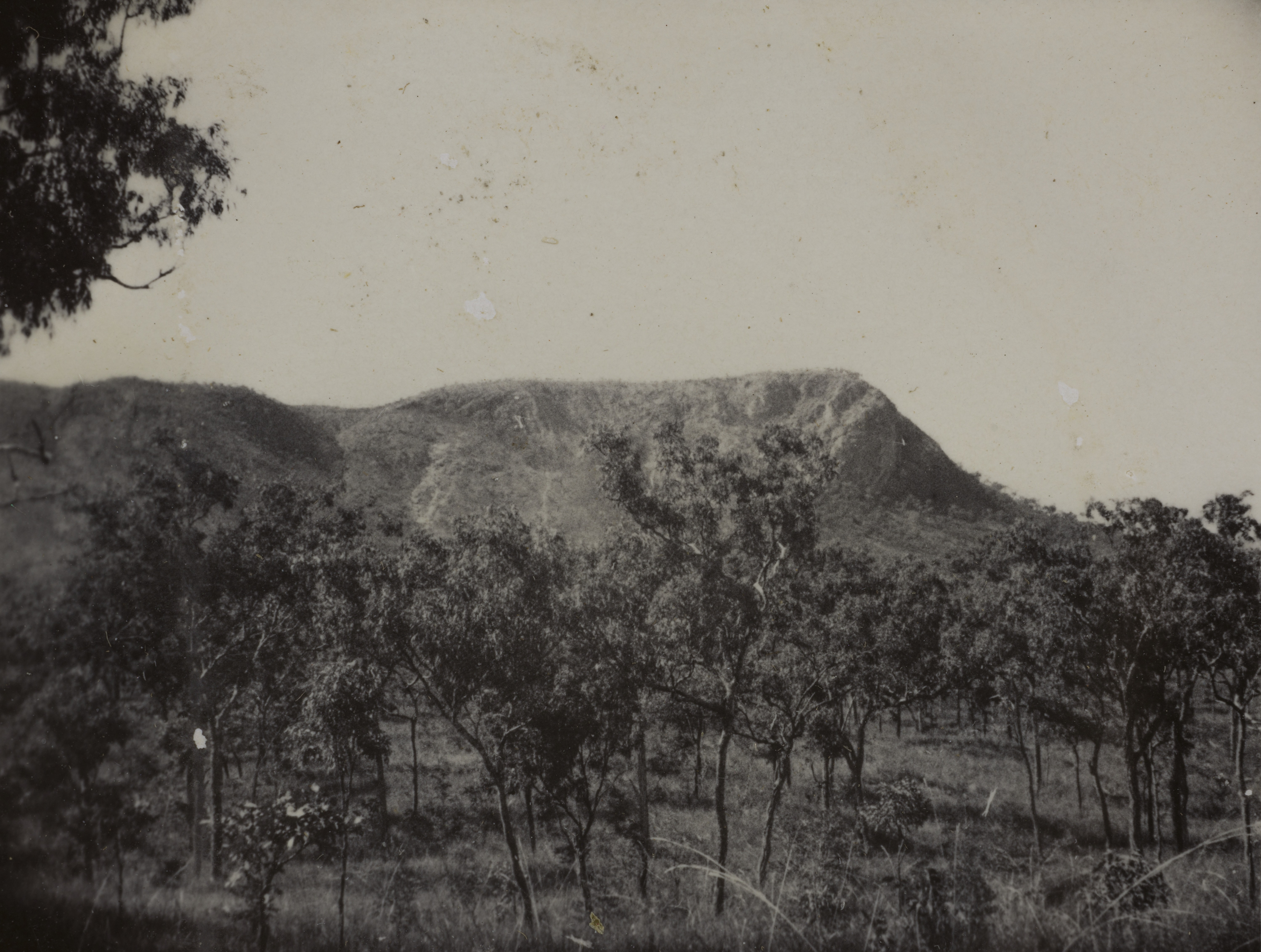
- Trees at the foothills of Mount Mulgrave, 1936

- Interactive map of Mount Mulgrave
- Coordinates: 16.2897°S 143.8922°E
- Country: Australia
- State: Queensland
- LGA: Shire of Mareeba
- Location: 119 km (74 mi) NNW of Chillagoe; 260 km (160 mi) NW of Mareeba; 323 km (201 mi) NW of Cairns; 631 km (392 mi) NW of Townsville; 1,946 km (1,209 mi) NNW of Brisbane

Government
  - State electorate: Cook
  - Federal division: Leichhardt

Area
  - Total: 1,403.4 km^{2} (541.9 sq mi)

Population
  - Total: 11 (2021 census)
  - Density: 0.0078/km^{2} (0.0203/sq mi)
- Time zone: UTC+10:00 (AEST)
- Postcode: 4871
Suburbs around Mount Mulgrave
Palmer	Palmer	Palmer
Gamboola	Mount Mulgrave	Groganville
Wrotham	Wrotham	Bellevue

Mount Mulgrave is an outback locality in the Shire of Mareeba, Queensland, Australia. In the 2021 census, Mount Mulgrave had a population of 11 people.

== Geography ==
The Mitchell River enters the locality from the south-east (Bellevue / Groganville) and forms the southern boundary of the locality, exiting to the south-west (Gamboola / Wrotham). It is within the Gulf of Carpentaria drainage basin.

The locality of Mount Mulgrave has the following mountains (from north to south):

- Mount Mulgrave in the north-east of the locality (16.2132°S 144.0353°E), rising 468 metres (1,535 ft) above sea level
- Bald Hills in the north-east of the locality (16.2369°S 144.0856°E), 330 metres (1,080 ft)
- Looking Glass Bluff on the eastern boundary of the locality (16.2709°S 144.1853°E), 490 metres (1,610 ft)

The entire locality is within the Mount Mulgrave pastoral station, which extends north into the neighbouring locality of Palmer. The land use is grazing on native vegetation.

== History ==
Yalanji (also known as Kuku Yalanji, Kuku Yalaja, Kuku Yelandji, and Gugu Yalanji) is an Australian Aboriginal language of Far North Queensland. The traditional language region is Mossman River in the south to the Annan River in the north, bordered by the Pacific Ocean in the east and extending inland to west of Mount Mulgrave. This includes the local government boundaries of the Shire of Douglas, the Shire of Cook and the Aboriginal Shire of Wujal Wujal and the towns and localities of Cooktown, Mossman, Daintree, Cape Tribulation and Wujal Wujal. It includes the head of the Palmer River, the Bloomfield River, China Camp, Maytown, and Palmerville.

The mountain Mount Mulgrave was named by explorer William Hann on 1 August 1872, named after the Earl of Mulgrave, who was the son of the Queensland Governor at that time (George Phipps, 2nd Marquess of Normanby).

== Demographics ==
In the 2016 census, Mount Mulgrave had "no people or a very low population".

In the 2021 census, Mount Mulgrave had a population of 11 people.

== Education ==
There are no schools in Mount Mulgrave nor nearby. The alternatives are distance education and boarding school.
