= Calcifer =

Calcifer may refer to:

- Calcifer (Howl's Moving Castle), a character in the 1986 novel Howl's Moving Castle
  - Calcifer, a character in the 2004 film Howl's Moving Castle
- Calcifer, Queensland, a ghost town in Australia

== See also ==
- Calcifier, an agent of calcification
- Calciferous, a descriptor for some types of rocks
- Calciferol, or Vitamin D
