= Rookwood, Queensland =

Rookwood
- Suburb
- Interactive map of Rookwood
- Coordinates: 17.0316°S 144.2202°E
- Country: Australia
- State: Queensland
- LGA: Shire of Mareeba
- Location: 175 km (109 mi) W of Mareeba; 237 km (147 mi) W of Cairns; 545 km (339 mi) NW of Townsville; 1,902 km (1,182 mi) NNW of Brisbane

Government
  - State electorate: Cook
  - Federal division: Kennedy

Area
  - Total: 1,315.6 km^{2} (508.0 sq mi)

Population
  - Total: 9 (2021 census)
  - Density: 0.0068/km^{2} (0.0177/sq mi)
- Time zone: UTC+10:00 (AEST)
- Postcode: 4871
Suburbs around Rookwood
Wrotham	Bellevue	Nychum
Arbouin	Rookwood	Chillagoe
Arbouin	Bolwarra	Crystalbrook

Rookwood is a rural locality in the Shire of Mareeba, Queensland, Australia. In the 2021 census, Rookwood had a population of 9 people.

== Geography ==
Mungana is a neighbourhood in the east of the locality (17.1°S 144.3833°E). The Walsh River flows through from east to west. Muldiva Creek flows through from south-east to west, on its way to join the Walsh.

The Burke Developmental Road runs through from south-east to north-west.

== Demographics ==
In the 2016 census, Rookwood had "no people or a very low population".

In the 2021 census, Rookwood had a population of 9 people.

== Education ==
There are no schools in Rookwood. The nearest government primary school is Chillagoe State School in neighbouring Chillagoe to the east, but it would be too distant for students in the north-west of Rookwood to attend. Also, there are no nearby secondary schools. The alternatives are distance education and boarding school.
