= Bellevue, Queensland =

Bellevue
- Suburb
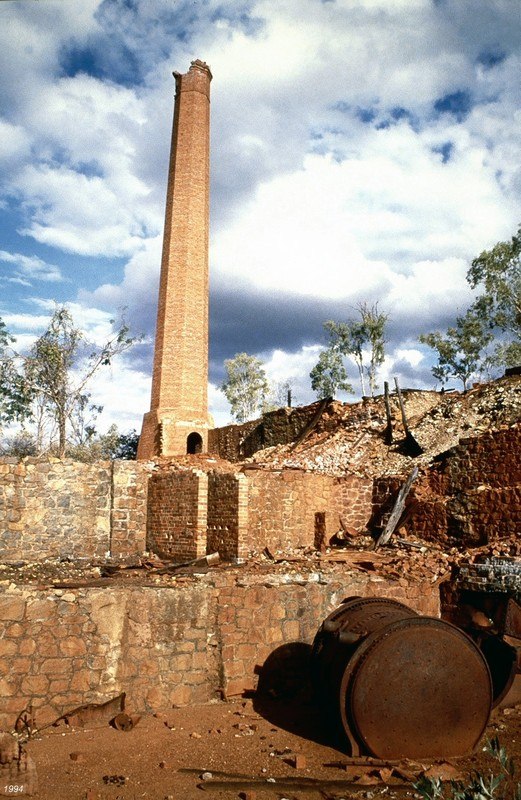
- Chimney at OK Mine & Smelter, 1994

- Interactive map of Bellevue
- Coordinates: 16.6463°S 144.2625°E
- Country: Australia
- State: Queensland
- LGA: Shire of Mareeba
- Location: 109 km (68 mi) NNW of Chillagoe; 250 km (160 mi) NW of Mareeba; 312 km (194 mi) WNW of Cairns; 621 km (386 mi) NNW of Townsville; 1,935 km (1,202 mi) NNW of Brisbane

Government
  - State electorate: Cook
  - Federal division: Kennedy

Area
  - Total: 978.6 km^{2} (377.8 sq mi)

Population
  - Total: 0 (2021 census)
  - Density: 0.0000/km^{2} (0.0000/sq mi)
- Time zone: UTC+10:00 (AEST)
- Postcode: 4892
Suburbs around Bellevue
Mount Mulgrave	Groganville	Hurricane
Wrotham	Bellevue	Nychum
Wrotham	Rookwood	Nychum

Bellevue is a rural locality in the Shire of Mareeba, Queensland, Australia. In the 2021 census, Bellevue had "no people or a very low population".

== Geography ==
The Mitchell River forms the northern boundary.

The Burke Developmental Road (State Route 27) passes through the south-west corner.

The Pinnacles is a mountain in the north of the locality (16.4881°S 144.3061°E), rising to 385 metres (1,263 ft) above sea level.

Ok is a former town within the locality (16.6058°S 144.2497°E).

The land use is grazing on native vegetation.

== History ==
Bellevue Provisional School opened in 1898 as a half-time school with Springbank Provisional School (meaning they shared a single teacher). It closed circa 1900.

In 1901, stockman John Munro found a deposit of copper which was initially sent to the smelter at Mount Garnet smelter for processing. The Ok Copper Mines Development Syndicate was formed to mine the deposit.

A post office opened in 1905, closing in 1912.

Ok was surveyed as a town in 1908. It was named after a well-known brand of jam.

The mine closed in 1909, but reopened in 1930, supplying the Chillagoe smelters, and closed permanently in 1942. Little remains of the town of Ok today.

Between 2008 and 2013, Bellevue (along with all other parts of the Shire of Mareeba) was within the Tablelands Region.

== Demographics ==
In the 2016 census, Bellevue had "no people or a very low population".

In the 2021 census, Bellevue had "no people or a very low population".

== Heritage listings ==
Bellevue has a number of heritage-listed sites, including:

- OK Mine & Smelter, Kitoba Holding (16.6045°S 144.2463°E)

== Education ==
There are no schools in Bellevue, nor nearby. The alternatives are distance education and boarding school.
