= Nychum =

- Suburb
- Interactive map of Nychum
- Coordinates: 16.7522°S 144.5116°E
- Country: Australia
- State: Queensland
- LGA: Shire of Mareeba
- Location: 70.3 km (43.7 mi) N of Chillagoe; 175 km (109 mi) W of Mareeba; 236 km (147 mi) W of Cairns; 1,898 km (1,179 mi) NNW of Brisbane

Government
  - State electorate: Cook
  - Federal divisions: Kennedy; Leichhardt

Area
  - Total: 1,026.0 km^{2} (396.1 sq mi)

Population
  - Total: 0 (2021 census)
  - Density: 0.0000/km^{2} (0.0000/sq mi)
- Time zone: UTC+10:00 (AEST)
- Postcode: 4871
Suburbs around Nychum
Bellevue	Hurricane	Hurricane
Bellevue	Nychum	Mount Mulligan
Rookwood	Chillagoe	Mount Mulligan

Nychum is a rural locality in the Shire of Mareeba, Queensland, Australia. In the 2021 census, Nychum had "no people or a very low population".

== Geography ==
The entire locality is within the pastoral property Nychum which has its homestead at the end of Nychum Road (16.8342°S 144.4219°E) adjacent to Elizabeth Creek. It is owned by the Kenny Creek pastoral company and is managed from their property in neighbouring Bellevue.

Wollenden Airstrip (also known as Nychum) is an airstrip located to the immediate south-west of the Nychum homestead (16.8412°S 144.4129°E).

The land use is grazing on native vegetation.

== Demographics ==
In the 2016 census, Nychum had "no people or a very low population".

In the 2021 census, Nychum had "no people or a very low population".

== Education ==
There are no schools in Nychum. The nearest government primary school is Chillagoe State School in neighbouring Chillagoe to the south. There are no nearby secondary schools. Distance education or boarding schools are the alternatives.
