= Bolwarra, Queensland =

Bolwarra
- Suburb
- Interactive map of Bolwarra
- Coordinates: 17.4666°S 144.01°E
- Country: Australia
- State: Queensland
- LGA: Shire of Mareeba
- Location: 71.9 km (44.7 mi) SW of Chillagoe; 213 km (132 mi) WSW of Mareeba; 276 km (171 mi) WSW of Cairns; 584 km (363 mi) NNW of Townsville; 1,899 km (1,180 mi) NNW of Brisbane

Government
  - State electorate: Cook
  - Federal division: Kennedy

Area
  - Total: 1,557.9 km^{2} (601.5 sq mi)

Population
  - Total: 0 (2021 census)
  - Density: 0.0000/km^{2} (0.0000/sq mi)
- Time zone: UTC+10:00 (AEST)
- Postcode: 4871
Suburbs around Bolwarra
Lyndside	Arbouin	Rookwood
Ravensworth	Bolwarra	Crystalbrook
Bulleringa	Bulleringa	Amber

Bolwarra is a rural locality in the Shire of Mareeba, Queensland, Australia. In the 2021 census, Bolwarra had "no people or a very low population".

== Geography ==
The Lynd River and its tributary the Tate River both flow through the locality from east to west.

Bolwarra has the following mountains (from north to south):

- Hermans Hill (17.3245°S 144.1011°E) 310 metres (1,020 ft)
- Sids Hill (17.4022°S 144.1961°E) 341 metres (1,119 ft)
- Taylors Hill (17.4731°S 144.0975°E) 362 metres (1,188 ft)
- Mount Valentine (17.4948°S 144.0772°E) 437 metres (1,434 ft)
- Mount May (17.5080°S 144.0988°E) 444 metres (1,457 ft)
- Reedy Creek Bluff (17.5317°S 144.1818°E)
- Mount William (17.6066°S 144.0654°E) 366 metres (1,201 ft)

The land use is grazing on native vegetation.

== Demographics ==
In the 2016 census, Bolwarra had "no people or a very low population".

In the 2021 census, Bolwarra had "no people or a very low population".

== Education ==
There are no schools in Bolwarra. The nearest government primary school is Chillagoe State School in Chillagoe to the north-east. However, it would be too distant for students in the south and west of the locality to attend. Also, there are no nearby secondary schools. The alternatives are distance education and boarding school.
