= Shire of Chillagoe =

Local government area of Queensland, Australia

Coordinates: 17.08°S 144.49°E

The Shire of Chillagoe was a local government area in Far North Queensland, Australia.

== History ==
On 16 December 1908, a small part of the Shire of Woothakata was transferred to the Shire of Walsh, which was then split with one part being proclaimed the new Shire of Chillagoe, based at Chillagoe.

On 25 June 1932, the Shires of Chillagoe and Walsh were merged back into the Shire of Woothakata, which was renamed the Shire of Mareeba on 20 December 1947.

== Chairmen ==
- 1927: William Cooper Bourke
