= Hurricane, Queensland =

Hurricane
- Suburb
- Interactive map of Hurricane
- Coordinates: 16.5216°S 144.6152°E
- Country: Australia
- State: Queensland
- LGA: Shire of Mareeba
- Location: 132 km (82 mi) NW of Mareeba; 195 km (121 mi) NW of Cairns; 204 km (127 mi) SW of Cooktown; 517 km (321 mi) NNW of Townsville; 1,873 km (1,164 mi) NNW of Brisbane

Government
  - State electorate: Cook
  - Federal divisions: Leichhardt; Kennedy

Area
  - Total: 1,060.5 km^{2} (409.5 sq mi)

Population
  - Total: 0 (2021 census)
  - Density: 0.0000/km^{2} (0.0000/sq mi)
- Time zone: UTC+10:00 (AEST)
- Postcode: 4871
Suburbs around Hurricane
Groganville	Lakeland	Desailly
Bellevue	Hurricane	Mount Carbine
Nychum	Mount Mulligan	Mount Mulligan

Hurricane is a rural locality in the Shire of Mareeba, Queensland, Australia. In the 2021 census, Hurricane had "no people or a very low population".

== Geography ==
Hurricane is located west of Mount Carbine and the Mulligan Highway, and is on the Mitchell River, which flows through the eastern section and then forms the south-western boundary. The Hodgkinson River, a tributary of the Mitchell, also flows through the eastern section. The St George River, also a tributary of the Mitchell, flows through the northern section and forms part of the north-western boundary. Much of the land in Hurricane consists of shaly or greywacke ridges.

The land use is grazing on native vegetation.

== Demographics ==
In the 2016 census, Hurricane had a population of 17 people.

In the 2021 census, Hurricane had "no people or a very low population".

== Economy ==
There are a number of homesteads in the locality, including cattle stations:

- Hurricane Station (16.5878°S 144.6581°E)
- Karma Waters (16.6179°S 144.6047°E)

The entry gate to Hurricane station homestead is 195 kilometres (121 mi) north-west of Cairns via the Captain Cook Highway, Kennedy Highway, Mulligan Highway and Hurricane Road.

== Education ==
There are no schools in Hurricane, nor nearby. The alternatives are distance education and boarding school.

== Attractions ==
Karma Waters station provides a bush camping experience for a limited number of guests.
