= Calcifer, Queensland =

Calcifer
- Town
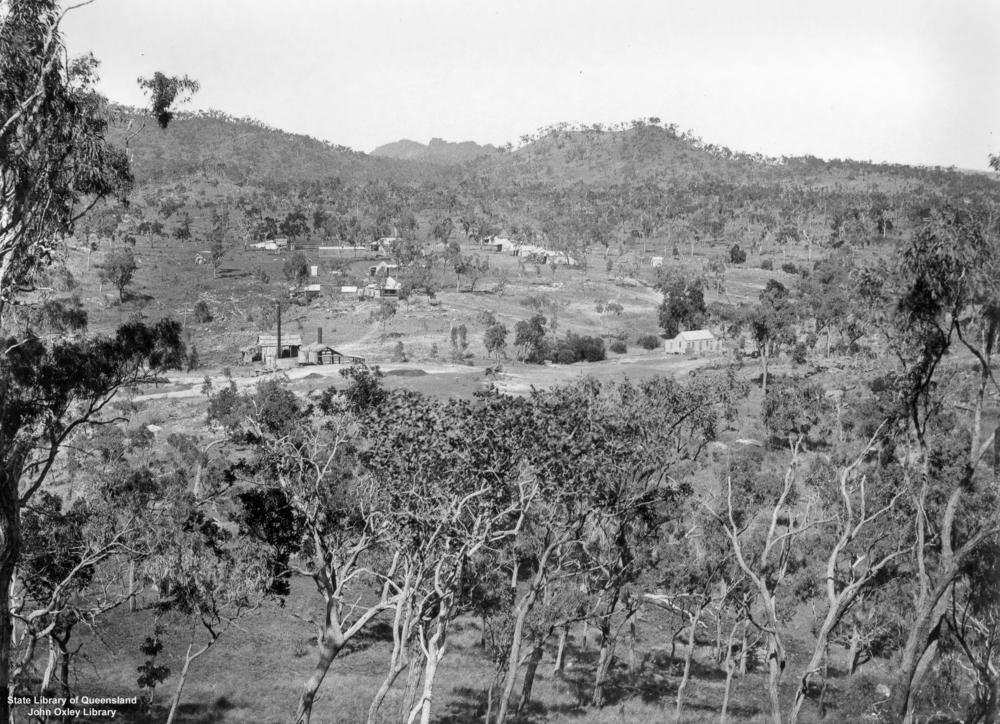
- Mines at Calcifer, circa 1900

- Coordinates: 17.2084°S 144.5780°E
- Country: Australia
- State: Queensland
- LGA: Shire of Mareeba
- Location: 13.1 km (8.1 mi) SE of Chillagoe; 133 km (83 mi) WSW of Mareeba; 195 km (121 mi) WSW of Cairns; 1,818 km (1,130 mi) NNW of Brisbane

Calcifer is a ghost town in the locality of Chillagoe in the Shire of Mareeba, Queensland, Australia.

== Geography ==
The town is located 200 kilometres (120 mi) west of Cairns, and southeast of Chillagoe. It is near Calcifer Creek.

== History ==
The town's name was derived from a combination of the words calx, cuprum and ferrum, the Latin words for "limestone", "copper", and "iron" respectively. The town was established in 1894, when John Moffat established a copper smelter on the site. At its height in 1898, the town had stores, a branch of the Bank of Australasia, a cricket team, and five hotels.

The township was officially proclaimed on 25 March 1899.

An accident at the nearby Hobson mine in 1903 killed three men; and by 1907 smelting operations had moved to Chillagoe, and the site was all but deserted. Today, all that remains are the foundations of the smelters and a small cemetery with five graves.
