= Groganville, Queensland =

Groganville
- Town
- Interactive map of Groganville
- Coordinates: 16.3938°S 144.3575°E
- Country: Australia
- State: Queensland
- LGA: Shire of Mareeba
- Location: 191 km (119 mi) W of Port Douglas; 193 km (120 mi) NW of Mareeb; 254 km (158 mi) NW of Cairns; 1,917 km (1,191 mi) NNW of Brisbane

Government
  - State electorate: Cook
  - Federal division: Leichhardt

Area
  - Total: 426.5 km^{2} (164.7 sq mi)

Population
  - Total: 0 (2021 census)
  - Density: 0.0000/km^{2} (0.0000/sq mi)
- Time zone: UTC+10:00 (AEST)
- Postcode: 4871
Localities around Groganville
Palmer	Palmer	Lakeland
Mount Mulgrave	Groganville	Hurricane
Bellevue	Bellevue	Hurricane

Groganville is a rural locality in the Shire of Mareeba, Queensland, Australia. It was formerly a mining town. In the 2021 census, the locality of Groganville had "no people or a very low population".

== Geography ==
The predominant land use is grazing on native vegetation. Almost the entire locality is within three pastoral stations: Groganville in the south, Palmerville in the north and Karma Waters to the east.

== History ==
The site of the town was surveyed by John J. Davies in May 1889. It was one of three towns on the Limestone Gold Field. By 1889 there were four hotels in the town.

The name Groganville is derived from Patrick Grogan, who operated a shop in the town in the 1890s. It was formerly known as Limestone.

Patrick Grogan was the son of Bryan Grogan & Grandson of William Grogan convict per the Isabella in 1823. William Grogan held 9800 acres on the Lachland Valley way near Bowning in New South Wales. it was known as the Grogan Farm at Limestone Creek, a portion of it was split off to Bryan & became known as "Groganville" & was operated by Patrick's older half brother WJ Grogan. Patrick encouraged his brothers to the new gold fields of Far North Queensland. James Killian Grogan, John & Brian Grogan joined him, as did their father Bryan. The Grogan family owned many business ventures in the new town of Limestone creek including the butchering or abattoir business as well as the cordial factory and pubs in town as well as a large portion of the Anglo Saxon mine. Patrick Grogan was also one of the towns Justice of the peace.

Currently and historically, Gronganville is within the local government area of Shire of Mareeba, but between 2008 and 2013, the Shire of Mareeba was temporarily absolished and Groganville was within the Tablelands Region.

== Demographics ==
In the 2016 census, the locality of Groganville had "no people or a very low population".

In the 2021 census, the locality of Groganville had "no people or a very low population".

== Heritage listings ==
Groganville has a number of heritage-listed sites, including:

- Anglo Saxon Mine

== Education ==
There are no schools in Groganville and none within driving distance. Distance education or boarding school would be the main options for schooling.

== See also ==
- List of tramways in Queensland
