= Desailly, Queensland =

Desailly
- Suburb
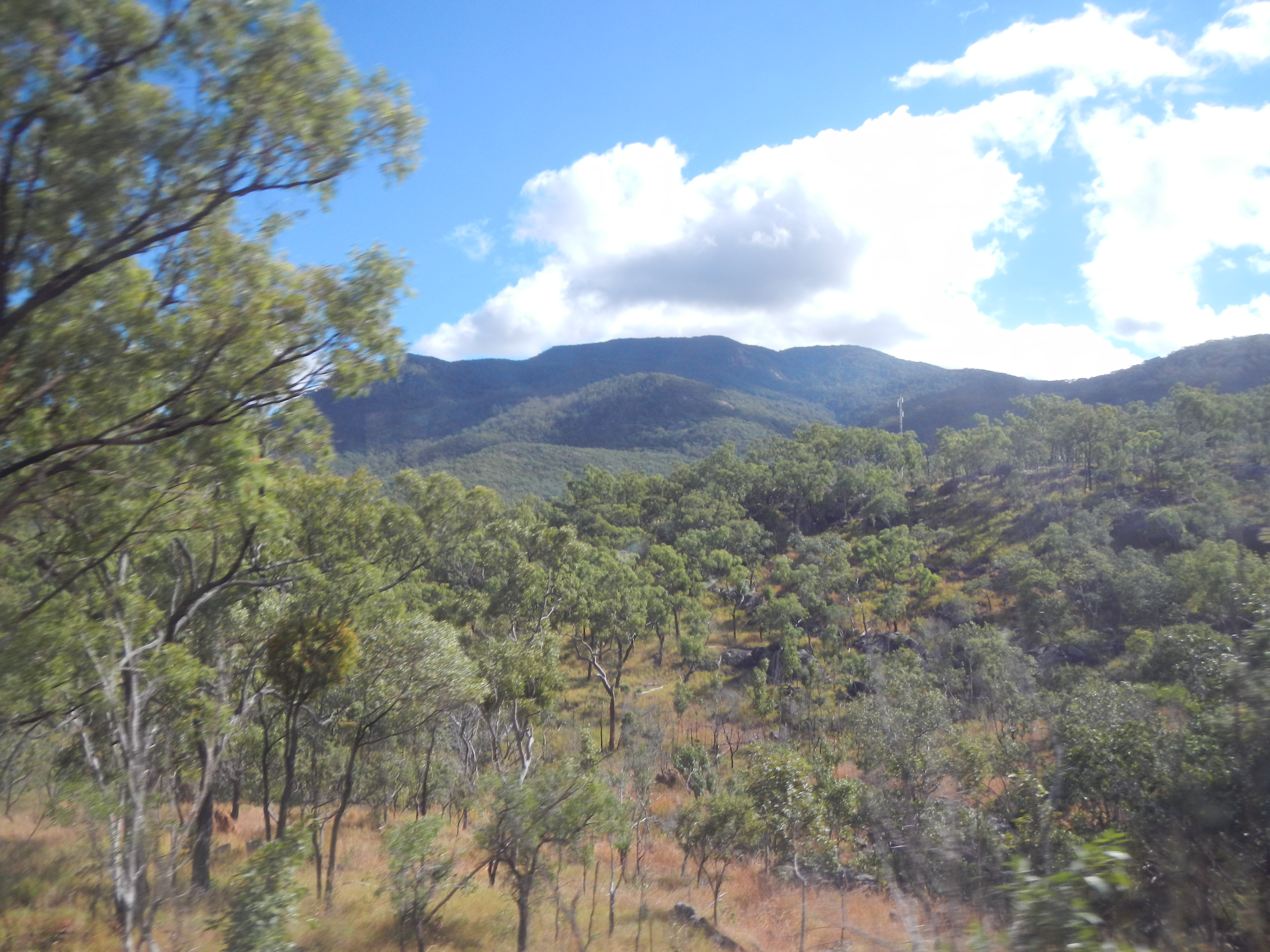
- Desailly landscape, 2013

- Interactive map of Desailly
- Coordinates: 16.4266°S 144.8972°E
- Country: Australia
- State: Queensland
- LGA: Shire of Mareeba
- Location: 55.7 km (34.6 mi) NW of Mount Molloy; 89.3 km (55.5 mi) S of Lakeland; 96.2 km (59.8 mi) NW of Mareeba; 154 km (96 mi) NW of Cairns; 1,837 km (1,141 mi) NNW of Brisbane

Government
  - State electorate: Cook
  - Federal divisions: Leichhardt; Kennedy

Area
  - Total: 1,130.7 km^{2} (436.6 sq mi)

Population
  - Total: 0 (2021 census)
  - Density: 0.0000/km^{2} (0.0000/sq mi)
- Time zone: UTC+10:00 (AEST)
- Postcode: 4871
Suburbs around Desailly
Lakeland	Lakeland	Lakeland
Hurricane	Desailly	Mount Carbine
Hurricane	Hurricane	Mount Carbine

Desailly is a rural locality in the Shire of Mareeba, Queensland, Australia. In the 2021 census, Desailly had "no people or a very low population".

== Geography ==
Desailly has the following mountains in the east of the locality:

- Mount Desailly (16.4370°S 144.9104°E) 893 metres (2,930 ft)
- Mount Elephant (16.4483°S 144.9347°E) 1,046 metres (3,432 ft)

The Mulligan Highway enters the locality from the south-east (Mount Carbine) and exits to the north (Lakeland).

The Mitchell River forms part of the locality's south-eastern boundary. The locality is with the Gulf of Carpentaria drainage basin, specifically within the catchment of the Mitchell River.

The land use is grazing on native vegetation.

== History ==
In 2019, the Desailly Renewal Energy Park was proposed as a large solar and wind farm to be established in Desailly and neighbouring Mount Carbine. Concerns were raised about tree felling and risks to biodiversity.

== Demographics ==
In the 2016 census, Desailly had "no people or a very low population".

In the 2021 census, Desailly had "no people or a very low population".

== Economy ==
Most of the localiy is within the Curraghmore & Spring Hill pastoral station.

== Education ==
There are no schools in Desailly. The nearest government primary schools are Mount Molloy State School in Mount Molloy to the south-east which serves the eastern part of the locality and Lakeland State School in neighbouring Lakeland to the north which serves the north-western part of the locality. However, the south-west of the locality is too distant for either of these schools. Also, there are no secondary schools serving the locality. Distance education and boarding school are the alternatives.
