= Mungana =

- Town
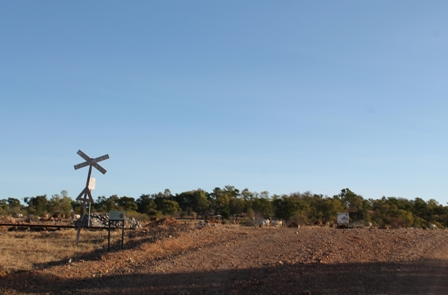
- Old Mungana town site

- Coordinates: 17.1008°S 144.3914°E
- Country: Australia
- State: Queensland
- LGA: Shire of Mareeba
- Location: 17.5 km (10.9 mi) NW of Chillagoe (town); 159 km (99 mi) W of Mareeba; 221 km (137 mi) W of Cairns; 1,844 km (1,146 mi) NNW of Brisbane

Government
  - State electorate: Cook
  - Federal division: Kennedy
- Time zone: UTC+10:00 (AEST)
- Postcode: 4871

Mungana is a former mining town in the rural locality of Chillagoe in the Shire of Mareeba, Queensland, Australia .

== History ==
Mungana Post Office opened by 1907 (a receiving office had been open in 1897 and 1898), closed in 1945, reopened in 1951 and closed again in 1960.

It was once the site of copper mines that featured in the Mungana Affair.

Although currently and historically within the local government area of Shire of Mareeba, between 2008 and 2013, it was part of Tablelands Region) due to a local government amalgamation that was subsequently reversed.

== Heritage listings ==
The Mungana Archaeological Area is a heritage-listed site.

== Education ==
The nearest government primary school is Chillagoe State School in the town of Chillagoe to the south-east. There are no secondary schools nearby; the alternatives are distance education and boarding school.
