= Gamboola, Queensland =

Gamboola
- Suburb
- Interactive map of Gamboola
- Coordinates: 16.4263°S 143.4013°E
- Country: Australia
- State: Queensland
- LGA: Shire of Mareeba
- Location: 160 km (99 mi) NW of Chillagoe; 301 km (187 mi) WNW of Mareeba; 364 km (226 mi) W of Cairns; 1,987 km (1,235 mi) NNW of Brisbane

Government
  - State electorate: Cook
  - Federal divisions: Leichhardt; Kennedy

Area
  - Total: 4,365.3 km^{2} (1,685.5 sq mi)

Population
  - Total: 0 (2021 census)
  - Density: 0.00000/km^{2} (0.00000/sq mi)
- Time zone: UTC+10:00 (AEST)
- Postcode: 4871
Suburbs around Gamboola
Palmer	Palmer	Palmer
Highbury	Gamboola	Mount Mulgrave
Staaten	Lyndside	Wrotham

Gamboola is a rural locality in the Shire of Mareeba, Queensland, Australia. In the 2021 census, Gamboola had "no people or a very low population".

== Geography ==
The Mitchell River enters the locality from the east (Mount Mulgrave / Wrotham) and flows west through the locality, exiting to the west (Highbury). The Lynd River enters from the south (Lyndside) and forms part of the south-western boundary of the locality before flowing north through the locality where it becomes a tributary of the Mitchell River.

The Burke Developmental Road (State Route 27) enters the locality from the west (Highbury) and travels east through the locality, exiting to the south-east (Wrotham).

Nobby is a peak in the south-east of the locality (16.45°S 143.6°E).

The land use is grazing on native vegetation.

== Demographics ==
In the 2016 census, Gamboola had a population of 23 people.

In the 2021 census, Gamboola had "no people or a very low population".

== Education ==
There are no schools in Gamboola, nor nearby. The alternatives are distance education and boarding school.
