= Walsh River =

River in Queensland, Australia

Walsh
- Location of Walsh River mouth in Queensland

Location
- Country: Australia
- State: Queensland
- Region: Far North Queensland, Gulf Country

Physical characteristics
- Source: Great Dividing Range
  - location: Watsonville, Far North Queensland
  - coordinates: 17.29636°S 145.40447°E
  - elevation: 918 m (3,012 ft)
- Mouth: confluence with the Mitchell River
  - location: Gamboola/Wrotham, Gulf Country
  - coordinates: 16.5329°S 143.69510°E
  - elevation: 116 m (381 ft)
- Length: 323 km (201 mi)

Basin features
- River system: Mitchell River

The Walsh River is a river on the Cape York Peninsula of Far North Queensland, Australia.

The headwaters of the river rise in the locality of Watsonville on the Atherton Tableland approximately 9.6 kilometres (6 mi) north of Herberton and then flow in a westerly direction then turning north past Mount Masterton and then veering west again near Tabacum. It crosses and then runs parallel to the Mareeba-Dimbulah Road then under Mount White and past Fumar and Dimbulah and through the Featherstone Range. It then flows to the north west crossing the Burke Developmental Road and eventually discharges into the Mitchell River of which it is a tributary on the boundary of the localities of Gamboola and Wrotham.

The drainage sub-basin occupies an area of 8,958 square kilometres (3,459 sq mi), and is part of the much larger Mitchell River catchment that has a total area of 71,670 square kilometres (27,672 sq mi).

== See also ==
- List of rivers of Australia § Queensland
