= Shire of Mareeba =

Coordinates: 16.98°S 145.02°E

- Local government area
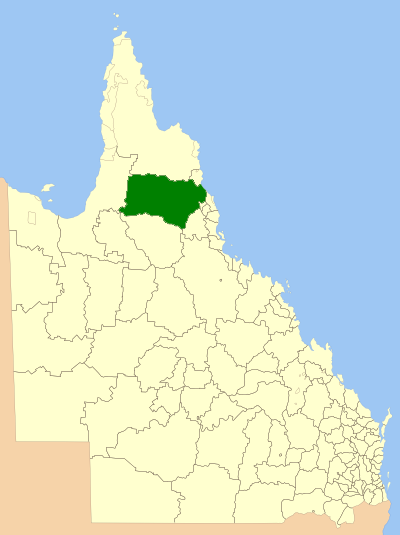
- Location within Queensland

- Interactive map of Shire of Mareeba
- Country: Australia
- State: Queensland
- Region: Far North Queensland
- Established: 2014
- Council seat: Mareeba

Government
  - Mayor: Angela Toppin

Area
  - Total: 53,491 km^{2} (20,653 sq mi)

Population
  - Total: 22,858 (2021 census)
  - Density: 0.427324/km^{2} (1.10676/sq mi)
- Website: Shire of Mareeba
LGAs around Shire of Mareeba
| Carpentaria | Cook | Douglas |
| Carpentaria | Shire of Mareeba | Coral Sea, Cairns |
| Etheridge | Tablelands | Tablelands |

The Shire of Mareeba is a local government area at the base of Cape York Peninsula in Far North Queensland, inland from Cairns. The shire, administered from the town of Mareeba, covered an area of 53,491 square kilometres (20,653.0 sq mi), and existed as a local government entity from 1879 until 2008, when it amalgamated with several councils in the Atherton Tableland area to become the Tablelands Region.

On 20 March 2013, Mareeba residents voted in favour of a proposal to reverse the amalgamation and to re-establish Mareeba Shire. The new Mareeba Shire was re-established on 1 January 2014.

In the 2021 census, the Shire of Mareeba had a population of 22,858 people.

== History ==
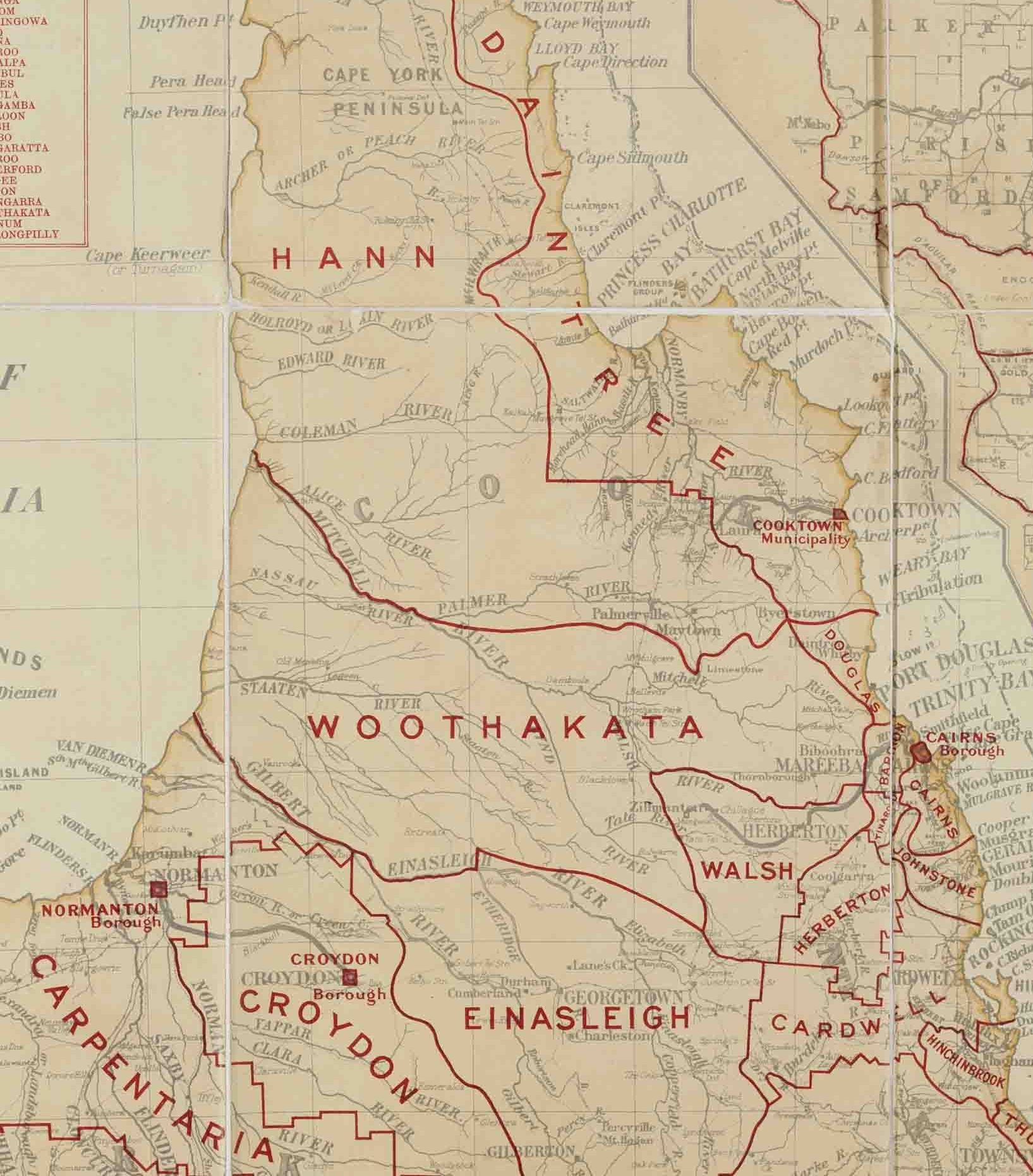
Map of Woothakata Division and adjacent local government areas, March 1902

The Woothakata Division, based in the mining town of Thornborough on the Hodgkinson goldfield, was created on 11 November 1879 as one of 74 divisions around Queensland under the Divisional Boards Act 1879 with a population of 1836. Woothakata is a Wakaman and Kuku Djungan Aboriginal word which describes the way (the journey) they travelled to Ngarrabullgan/Mount Mulligan, an important meeting place. The name Woothakata lives on as the name of a property at Chillagoe.

On 3 September 1881, the Tinaroo Division was created under the Divisional Boards Act 1879 out of parts of the Cairns, Hinchinbrook and Woothakata Divisions.

On 18 May 1889, the tin-mining area at Stannary Hills and Irvinebank and its hinterland in and around the Walsh River (an area of 4110 sq miles) were severed from Woothakata Division to create Walsh Division.

On 20 December 1890, part of the Tinaroo Division was excised to create the new Barron Division, closer to Cairns.

With the passage of the Local Authorities Act 1902, the Divisions of Woothakata, Tinaroo and Barron became Shires of Woothaka, Tinaroo and Barron on 31 March 1903.

On 16 December 1908, a small part of Shire of Woothakata was transferred to the Shire of Walsh, which was then split with one part being proclaimed the new Shire of Chillagoe, based at Chillagoe.

In 1919, Woothakata's seat of administration moved to Mareeba. Thornborough had declined steadily in importance, having a population of 58 in 1921 and 29 in 1933. The same year, on 20 December, the Shire of Barron was abolished, with its area being split between the Shire of Mulgrave and Shire of Woothakata.

On 25 June 1932, the Shires of Walsh and Chillagoe were absorbed by the Shire of Woothakata, which was then organised into six divisions, of which the former Shires of Chillagoe and Walsh formed the greater part of the sixth division. Division 3 had 2 representatives and all the other divisions had only one representative.

On 20 December 1947, the Shire of Woothakata was renamed the Shire of Mareeba.

A new Mareeba Shire Hall was built in Mareeba in 1961; it was added to the Queensland Heritage Register on 11 October 2013.

On 22 March 1995, parts of the Shires of Mareeba and Douglas and the whole of the abolished Shire of Mulgrave were added to the City of Cairns.

On 15 March 2008, under the Local Government (Reform Implementation) Act 2007 passed by the Parliament of Queensland on 10 August 2007, the Shire of Mareeba merged with the Shires of Atherton, Eacham and Herberton to form the Tablelands Region.

In 2012, a proposal was made to de-amalgamate the Shire of Mareeba from the Tablelands Region. On 9 March 2013, the citizens of the former Mareeba shire voted in a referendum to de-amalgamate. The shire was re-established on 1 January 2014.

== Towns and localities ==
The Shire of Mareeba includes the following settlements:

- Mareeba
- Almaden
- Amber
- Arbouin
- Arriga
- Barwidgi
- Bellevue
- Biboohra
- Bilwon
- Bolwarra
- Bulleringa
- Chewko
- Chillagoe
- Crystalbrook
- Desailly
- Dimbulah
- Forty Mile
- Fossilbrook
- Gamboola
- Glen Russell
- Groganville
- Highbury
- Hurricane
- Irvinebank
- Julatten
- Kingsborough
- Koah
- Kowrowa
- Kuranda
- Lyndside
- Mona Mona
- Mount Carbine
- Mount Carbine Tableland
- Mount Molloy
- Mount Mulgrave
- Mount Mulligan
- Munderra
- Mungana
- Mutchilba
- Myola
- Paddys Green
- Petford
- Ravensworth
- Red River
- Rookwood
- Southedge
- Speewah
- Springfield
- Staaten
- Strathmore
- Thornborough
- Watsonville
- Wrotham

Note:

- Prior to 1996, the Shire of Mareeba also included the localities of Barron Gorge, Lamb Range and Redlynch to the west of Cairns. These were incorporated into the City of Cairns.

== Libraries ==
Mareeba Shire Council operate public libraries at Chillagoe, Dimbulah, Kuranda and Mareeba.

== Demographics ==
| Year | Population | Notes |
|---|---|---|
| 1933 | 8,248 | |
| 1947 | 6,312 | |
| 1954 | 7,595 | |
| 1961 | 10,212 | |
| 1966 | 10,789 | |
| 1971 | 11,676 | |
| 1976 | 12,136 | |
| 1981 | 14,003 | |
| 1986 | 15,563 | |
| 1991 | 17,129 | |
| 1996 | 18,044 | |
| 2001 census | 17,961 | |
| 2006 census | 18,212 | |
| 2011 | | Shire of Mareeba did not exist due to amalgamation into the Tablelands Region. |
| 2016 census | 21,557 | |
| 2021 census | 22,858 | |

In the 2016 census, the Shire of Mareeba had a population of 21,557 people.

In the 2021 census, the Shire of Mareeba had a population of 22,858 people. 30.9% described their ancestry as English. This is followed by 29.9% who described their ancestry as Australian, then Italian (10.0%), Australian Aboriginal (9.7%) and Irish at 9.3%. 74.4% spoke only English at home followed by the next most common languages: 2.9% Italian, 0.8% German, 0.7% Mandarin, 0.5% Afrikaans and 0.3% French. Indigenous Australians were listed as making up 14.3% of the Mareeba shire population.

== Chairmen and mayors ==
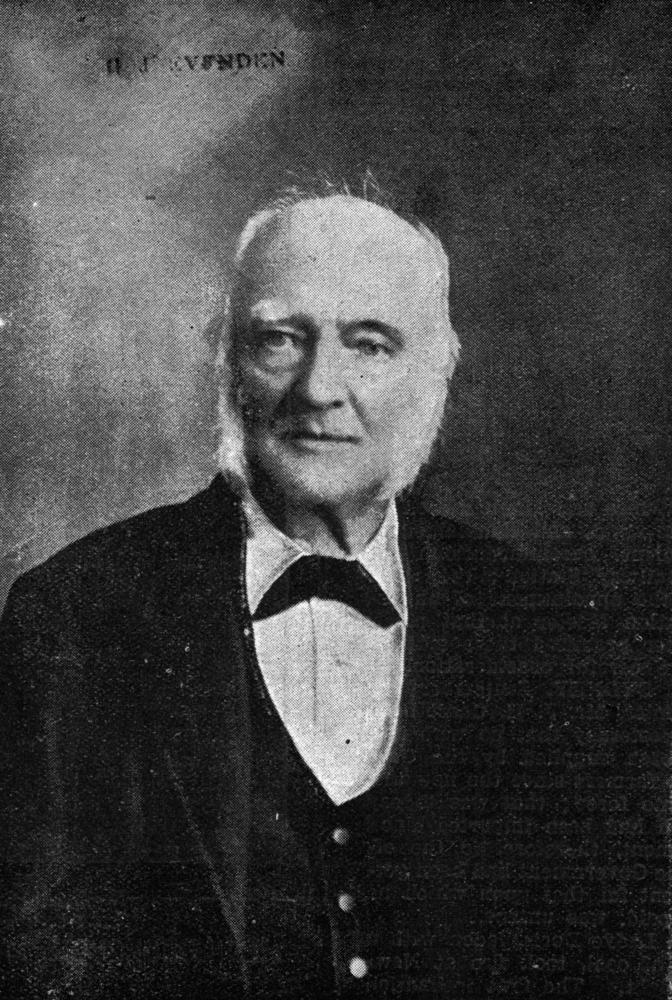
George J. Evenden

In early years the elected councillors chose one among them to the chairman on an annual basis. The following are the chairmen of the Woothakata Division and Shire of Woothakata:

- 1890–1907: George Jonathan Evenden
- 1920: James Harris

From 1921, chairmen of shires were elected by the voters for a period of 3 years.

- August 1921– : Ernest Albert Atherton
- 1927, 1929, 1931: George Henry O'Donnell

The following are the chairmen in the first incarnation of Shire of Mareeba:

- 1933–1935, –December 1939: William Gardner
- December 1939– : J. M. Brown
- 1950: J. M. Brown
- 1973–1976: Martin Tenni, Member of the Queensland Legislative Assembly for Barron River

The following are the mayors in the current incarnation of Shire of Mareeba:

- 2014–2020: Tom Gilmore, former Member of the Queensland Legislative Assembly for Tablelands
- 2020–present : Angela Toppin

== Current Council (2024-present) ==
| | Position | Political Party |
|---|---|---|
| Angela Toppin | Mayor | - |
| Lenore Wyatt | Deputy Mayor | - |
| Mladen Bosnic | Councillor | - |
| Amy Braes | Councillor | - |
| Nipper Brown | Councillor | - |
| Ross Cardillo | Councillor | - |
| Mary Graham | Councillor | - |
