= Chillagoe, Queensland =

Chillagoe
- Town
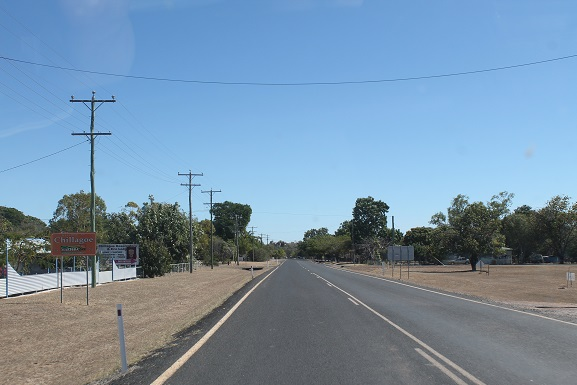

- Interactive map of Chillagoe
- Coordinates: 17.155°S 144.5244°E
- Country: Australia
- State: Queensland
- LGA: Shire of Mareeba
- Location: 142 km (88 mi) WSW of Mareeba; 204 km (127 mi) WSW of Cairns; 1,827 km (1,135 mi) NNW of Brisbane

Government
  - State electorate: Cook
  - Federal division: Kennedy

Area
  - Total: 2,205.8 km^{2} (851.7 sq mi)

Population
  - Total: 214 (2021 census)
  - Density: 0.09702/km^{2} (0.2513/sq mi)
- Time zone: UTC+10:00 (AEST)
- Postcode: 4871
Localities around Chillagoe
Nychum	Mount Mulligan	Thornborough
Rookwood	Chillagoe	Dimbulah
Crystalbrook	Almaden	Petford

Chillagoe is a rural town and locality in the Shire of Mareeba, Queensland, Australia. In the 2021 census, the locality of Chillagoe had a population of 214 people.

It was once a thriving mining town for a range of minerals, but is now reduced to a small zinc mine and some marble quarries.

Just out of town is the Chillagoe-Mungana Caves National Park containing limestone caves. There are between 600 and 1,000 caves in the Chillagoe-Mungana area. The caves, the spectacular karst landscape and the mining and smelting history are the main tourist attractions to the region.

It has been stated by leading geologist Professor Ian Plimer that the Chillagoe region has the most diverse geology in the world.

== History ==
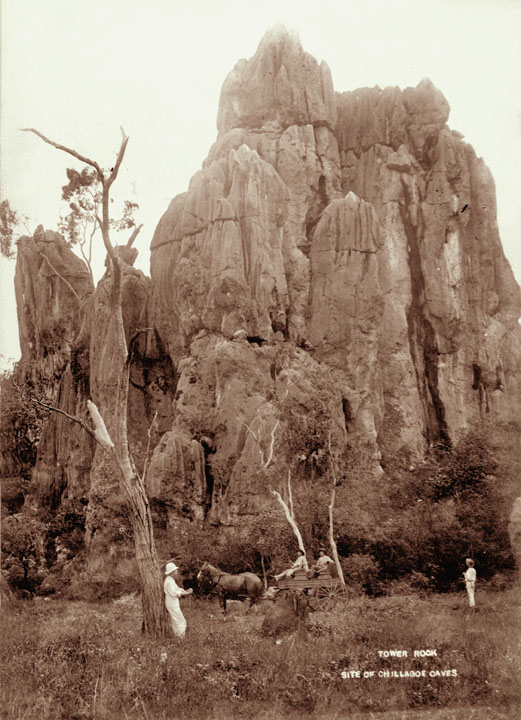
A horse and carriage at Tower Rock in 1897

Chillagoe was named by William Atherton in 1888. The name is taken from the refrain of a sea shanty: "Hikey, Tikey, Psyche, Crikey, Chillagoe, Walabadorie". James Mulligan had explored the area in 1873 and Atherton backed up his reports of rich copper outcrops in the area. Mining pioneer John Moffat sent prospectors to the field in 1888 and quickly monopolised the field. A receiving office opened in 1891 (with W. Atherton as Receiving Office Keeper) but closed in 1893. A post office opened in 1900 with F. Donner as the storekeeper and postmaster. The Chillagoe Railway and Mining Company's line opened from Mareeba in 1901 and a Town Reserve was proclaimed 27 October 1910.

In 1899, Finnish socialist Matti Kurikka and around 100 followers attempted to establish a utopian settlement in Chillagoe. The project failed within a year, and Kurikka sailed to Canada, where he went on to lead a similarly short-lived utopian settlement in Sointula, British Columbia.

Chillagoe is sometimes remembered for its involvement in the Mungana affair, a mining scandal which brought down the government. In 1919, after fluctuating fortunes and closures, ownership of the smelter was transferred to the Queensland Government. This acquisition by the Labor Government brought allegations of political corruption which persisted for many years. Closures plagued the smelter again in the late 1920s. When the Labor Party lost power in 1929, the new government ordered a Royal Commission into the incident. The political careers of two former Queensland Premiers, 'Red' Ted Theodore and William McCormack, were ruined by the commission's report.

The Chillagoe Public Library opened in 2002.

Although Chillagoe is currently and historically within the local government area of Shire of Mareeba, between 2008 and 2013 the Shire (and hence Chillagoe) was amalgamated into the Tablelands Region.

== Demographics ==
In the 2006 census, the town of Chillagoe had a population of 227 people.

In the 2011 census, the locality of Chillagoe had a population of 192 people.

In the 2016 census, the locality of Chillagoe had a population of 251 people.

In the 2021 census, the locality of Chillagoe had a population of 214 people.

== Education ==
Chillagoe State School is a government primary (Prep–6) school for boys and girls on Cathedral Street (17.1553°S 144.5211°E). In 2018, the school had an enrolment of 21 students with 2 teachers and 6 non-teaching staff (2 full-time equivalent).

There are no nearby secondary schools. The alternatives are distance education and boarding school.

=== Educational history ===
There were many schools established in the Chillagoe area, often short-lived, reflecting the movement of families from one mine site to another.

Muldiva Provisional School opened circa 1892 and closed circa 1893. Tate Tin Mines Provisional School opened on 17 October 1894. On 1 January 1909, it became Tate Tin Mines State School. It closed on 31 January 1924, but reopened on 3 February 1930. It closed permanently on 31 December 1940. Girofla Provisional School opened circa 1898 (sometimes misspelt as Girolfa). On 1 January 1909 it became Girofla State School. In 1910 it was renamed Mungana State School. It closed circa 1943.

Calcifer Provisional School opened in January 1900 and closed in 1905. Chillagoe State School opened on 1 April 1902. Redcap Provisional School opened in 1905 and closed circa 1908. O.K. Provisional School opened in 1906. On 1 January 1909, it became O.K. State School. It closed circa 1910. Almaden Provisional School opened on 6 July 1906. On 1 January 1909, it became Almaden State School. It closed on 12 December 1997.

Fossilbrook Provisional School opened in 1908. On 1 January 1909, it became Fossilbrook State School. It closed in 1926. Zillmanton State School opened in 1909 and closed in 1912. Gilmore Provisional School opened in 1909 and closed in 1913. Cardross State School opened in 1914 and closed circa 1918.

== Heritage listings ==
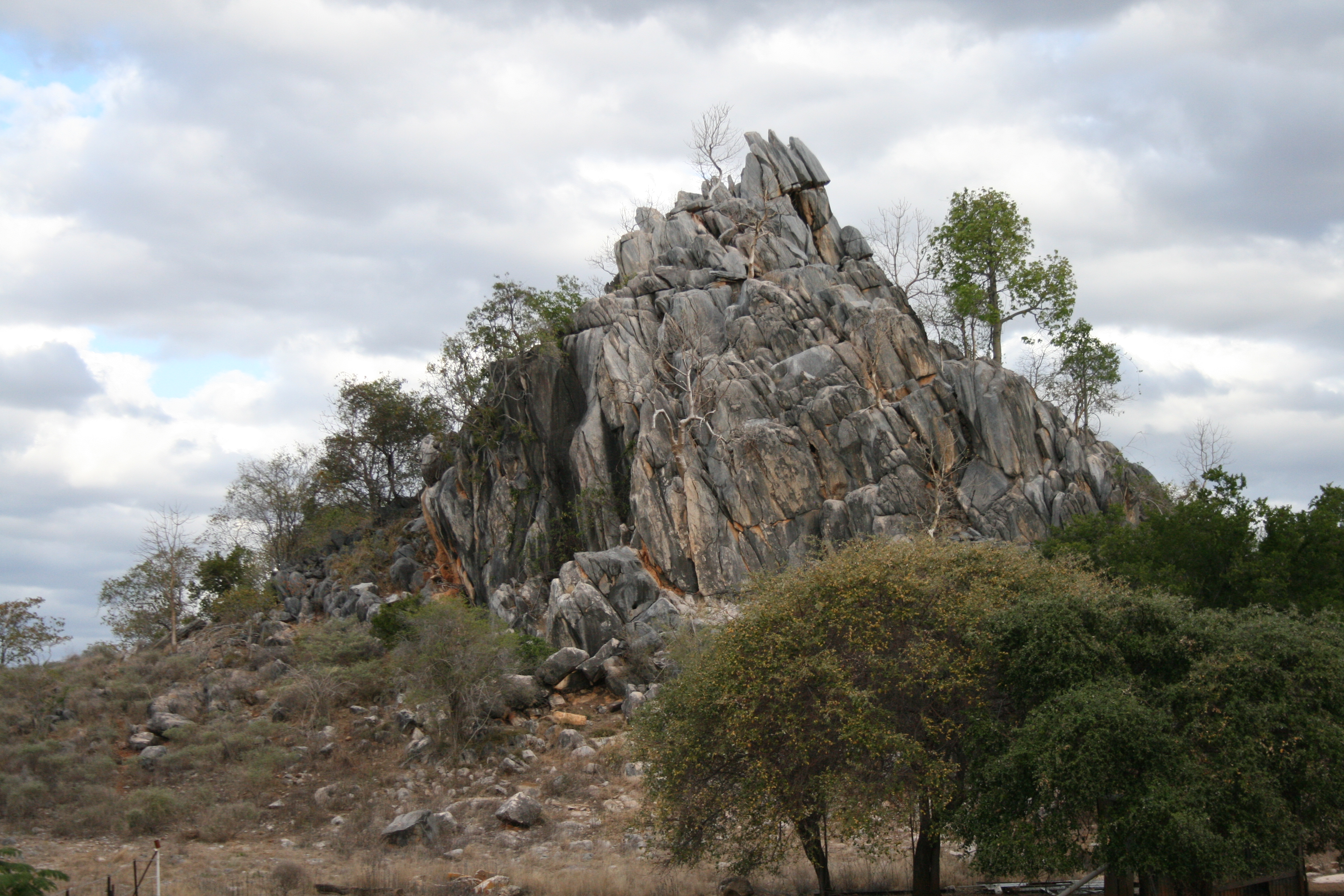
Limestone boulders, Chillagoe

Chillagoe has a number of heritage-listed sites, including:

- Chillagoe smelters
- Mungana Archaeological Area

== Transport ==
Chillagoe Airport is north of the town (17.1373°S 144.5287°E).

Chillagoe was once the terminus of the Mareeba-to-Chillagoe railway line. That line has closed, leaving the following abandoned stations:

- Griffiths Siding railway siding (17.1246°S 144.4129°E).
- Mungana railway station (17.1038°S 144.3905°E).
- Chillagoe railway station (17.1498°S 144.5265°E).
- Fluorspar railway station (17.2580°S 144.6151°E).

== Facilities ==
Facilities available in Chillagoe include:

- Chillagoe Police Station (17.1549°S 144.5214°E)
- Chillagoe Ambulance Station (17.1500°S 144.5281°E)
- Chillagoe SES Facility (17.1543°S 144.5207°E).
- Chillagoe Hospital (17.1501°S 144.5280°E)
- Chillagoe Primary Health Centre (17.1498°S 144.5289°E)
- Chillagoe Cemetery is a cemetery (17.1360°S 144.5316°E)
- Mungana Reserve (cemetery) (17.0872°S 144.3892°E)

== Amenities ==
The Mareeba Shire Council operates a public library in Chillagoe at The Hub, 21-23 Queen Street.

The Catholic Church is at 24–28 Queen Street. It is dedicated to St Nicholas of Tolentino and Blessed Mother Mary of the Cross. It is within the Chillagoe Parish of the Roman Catholic Diocese of Cairns.

Chillagoe Town Hall is a public hall (17.1549°S 144.5235°E).

Chillagoe Hotel Motel provides meals and accommodation (17.1522°S 144.5223°E).

== Attractions ==
Woothakata is a property on a Chillagoe creek named after the Shire of Woothakata of which Chillagoe was once part. Woothakata is an Aboriginal word meaning mountain of a strange shape used to describe Mount Mulligan.

The heritage-listed Chillagoe smelters, the cemetery and the many old mines illustrate the history of the town.
