= Ravensworth, Queensland =

Ravensworth
- Suburb
- Interactive map of Ravensworth
- Coordinates: 17.2913°S 143.6372°E
- Country: Australia
- State: Queensland
- LGA: Shire of Mareeba
- Location: 119 km (74 mi) WSW of Chillagoe; 261 km (162 mi) WSW of Mareeba; 323 km (201 mi) WSW of Cairns; 1,948 km (1,210 mi) WSW of Brisbane

Government
  - State electorate: Cook
  - Federal division: Kennedy

Area
  - Total: 1,370.2 km^{2} (529.0 sq mi)

Population
  - Total: 0 (2021 census)
  - Density: 0.0000/km^{2} (0.0000/sq mi)
- Time zone: UTC+10:00 (AEST)
- Postcode: 4871
Suburbs around Ravensworth
| Strathmore | Lyndside | Lyndside |
| Strathmore | Ravensworth | Bolwarra |
| Red River | Bulleringa | Bolwarra |

Ravensworth is a rural locality in the Shire of Mareeba, Queensland, Australia. In the 2021 census, Ravensworth had "no people or a very low population".

== Geography ==
The Lynd River flows through from south-east to north. The Tate River flows from the east to join the Lynd in the centre.

== Demographics ==
In the 2016 census, Ravensworth had "no people or a very low population".

In the 2021 census, Ravensworth had "no people or a very low population".

== Education ==
There are no schools in Ravensworth, nor nearby. The alternatives are distance education and boarding school.
