= Bulleringa, Queensland =

Bulleringa
- Suburb
- Interactive map of Bulleringa
- Coordinates: 17.6152°S 143.9330°E
- Country: Australia
- State: Queensland
- LGA: Shire of Mareeba
- Location: 101 km (63 mi) NW of Mount Surprise; 113 km (70 mi) NE of Georgetown; 276 km (171 mi) SW of Mareeba; 338 km (210 mi) WSW of Cairns; 1,817 km (1,129 mi) NNW of Brisbane

Government
  - State electorate: Cook
  - Federal division: Kennedy

Area
  - Total: 521.8 km^{2} (201.5 sq mi)

Population
  - Total: 0 (2021 census)
  - Density: 0.0000/km^{2} (0.0000/sq mi)
- Time zone: UTC+10:00 (AEST)
- Postcode: 4871
Suburbs around Bulleringa
Ravensworth	Bolwarra	Bolwarra
Red River	Bulleringa	Bolwarra
Abingdon Downs	Abingdon Downs	Amber

Bulleringa is a rural locality in the Shire of Mareeba, Queensland, Australia. In the 2021 census, Bulleringa had "no people or a very low population".

== Geography ==
Dickson Creek, a tributary of the Lynd River, flows through from south to north.

The Bulleringa National Park occupies all of the locality, extending south into neighbouring Abingdon Downs. There is no public access to this national park to protect its vegetation and wildlife.

== History ==
Bulleringa's traditional owners are the Ewamian and Wakamin people.

British settlement in the area began in the 1890s with a tin mine. A Cobb and Co wagon and mail route from Chillagoe to Georgetown commenced the early 1890s and passed through the area until the route was abandoned in the 1930s. Significant pastoral development began in 1946, when the Martin family established a homestead.

Bulleringa National Park was gazetted in 1994.

== Demographics ==
In the 2016 census, Bulleringa had "no people or a very low population".

In the 2021 census, Bulleringa had "no people or a very low population".

== Education ==
There are no schools in or near Bulleringa. The alternatives are distance education and boarding school.
