= Springfield, Queensland (Mareeba Shire) =

Springfield
- Suburb
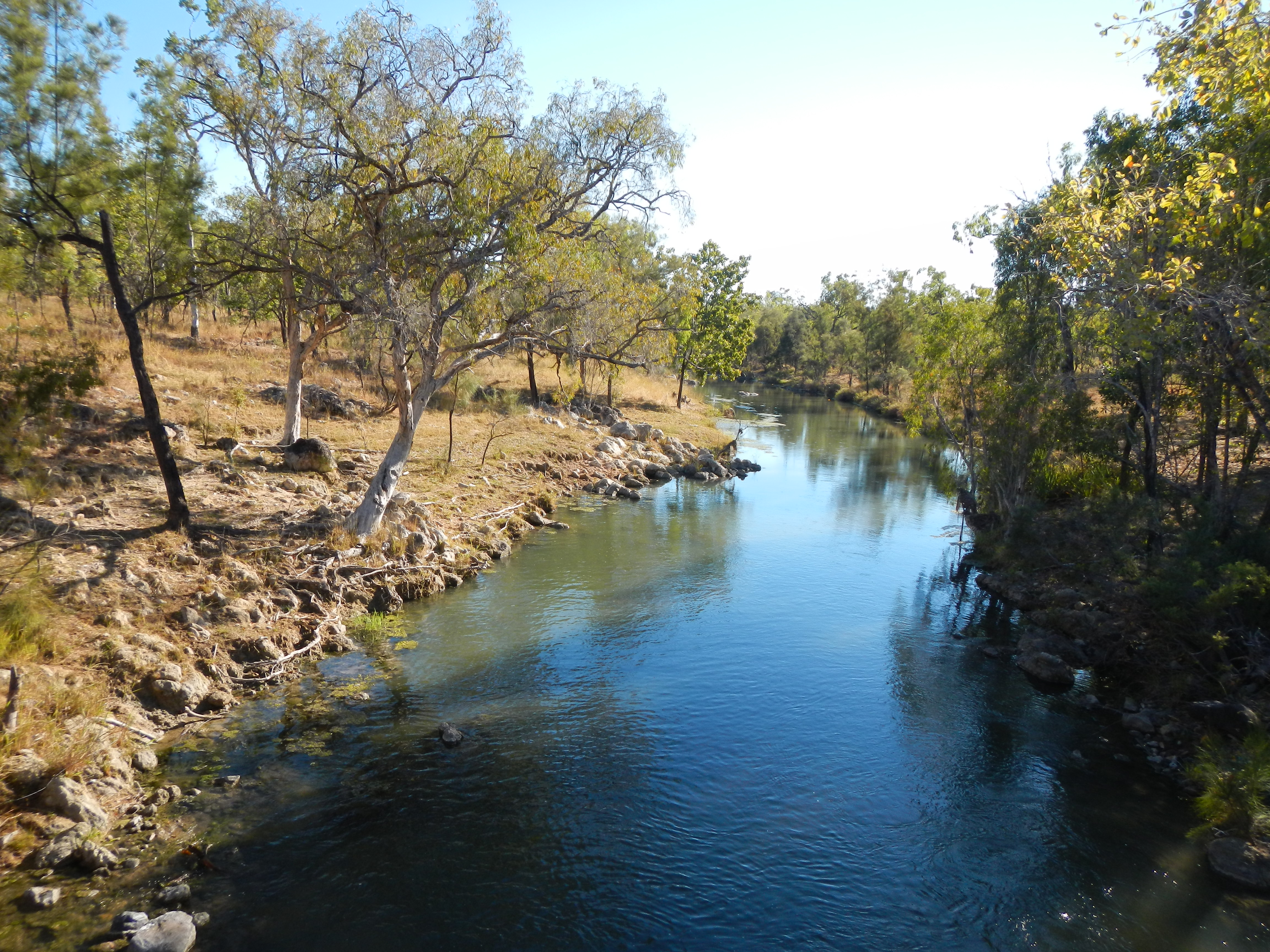
- Fossibrook Creek in Springfield

- Interactive map of Springfield
- Coordinates: 17.9316°S 144.5233°E
- Country: Australia
- State: Queensland
- LGA: Shire of Mareeba
- Location: 31.5 km (19.6 mi) NE of Mount Surprise; 122 km (76 mi) SW of Mount Garnet; 218 km (135 mi) SW of Mareeba; 280 km (170 mi) SW of Cairns; 1,720 km (1,070 mi) NNW of Brisbane

Government
  - State electorates: Hill; Cook
  - Federal division: Kennedy

Area
  - Total: 618.5 km^{2} (238.8 sq mi)

Population
  - Total: 14 (2021 census)
  - Density: 0.0226/km^{2} (0.0586/sq mi)
- Time zone: UTC+10:00 (AEST)
- Postcode: 4871
Suburbs around Springfield
Fossilbrook	Amber	Barwidgi
Fossilbrook	Springfield	Forty Mile
Mount Surprise	Mount Surprise	Forty Mile

Springfield is a rural locality in the Shire of Mareeba, Queensland, Australia. In the 2021 census, Springfield had a population of 14 people.

== Geography ==
The Lynd River enters the locality from the east (Forty Mile) and forms part of the south-eastern boundary of the locality, before turning and flowing north-west, exiting the locality to the north-west (Fossilbrook / Amber). The locality is within the Mitchell River catchment within the Gulf of Carpentaria drainage basin.

The Tablelands railway line enters the locality from the west (Fossilbrook) and exits to the south-west (Mount Surprise).

Frewhurst is a neighbourhood within the locality (17.9833°S 144.4°E), taking its name from the Frewhurst railway station on the Etheridge railway line (now part of the Tablelands railway line). The station was named on 16 December 1909 by the Etheridge Mining and Railway Company, with the approval of Queensland Railways, after railway engineer Archibald Smith Frew (184?–1917) who was involved in the construction of that railway line and others in Queensland.

Springfield has the following mountains and passes (from north to south):

- Mount Pudding Basin (17.8624°S 144.5196°E) 582 metres (1,909 ft)
- Mount Bridge (17.9091°S 144.5434°E) 542 metres (1,778 ft)
- Mount Garling (17.9725°S 144.4948°E) 596 metres (1,955 ft)
- Telegraph Gap (17.9728°S 144.3641°E)

== History ==
Fossilbrook Creek railway station is an abandoned railway station on the Etheridge railway line (17.8946°S 144.4376°E).

== Demographics ==
In the 2016 census, Springfield had "no people or a very low population".

In the 2021 census, Springfield had a population of 14 people.

== Education ==
There are no schools in Springfield. The nearest government primary schools are Mount Surprise State School in neighbouring Mount Surprise to the south and Mount Garnet State School in Mount Garnet to the north-east. There are no secondary schools nearby; the alternatives are distance education and boarding school.
