= Fossilbrook =

- Suburb
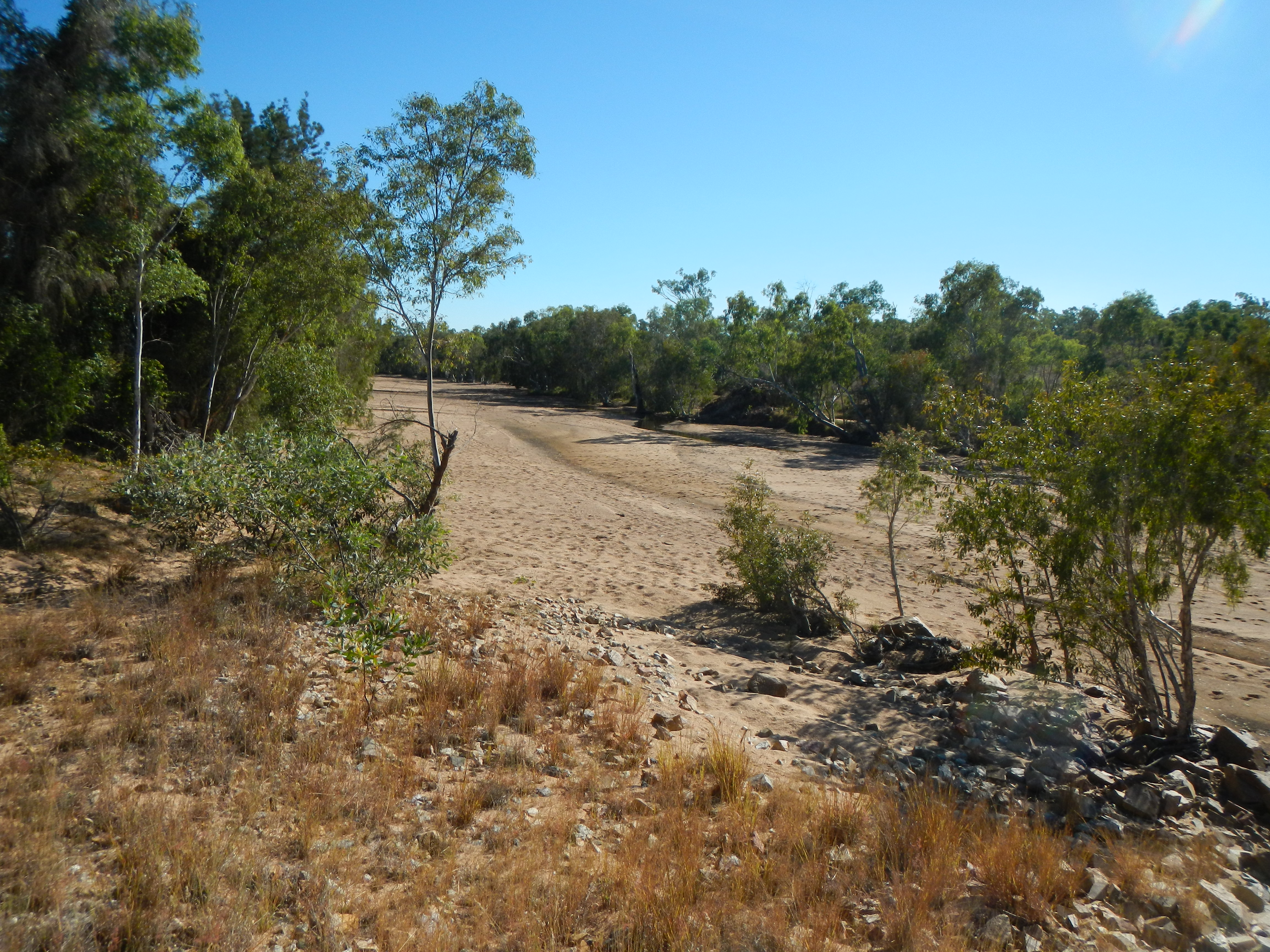
- Fossilbrook landscape, 2013

- Interactive map of Fossilbrook
- Coordinates: 17.8594°S 144.2569°E
- Country: Australia
- State: Queensland
- LGA: Shire of Mareeba
- Location: 51.1 km (31.8 mi) N of Mount Surprise; 143 km (89 mi) ENE of Georgetown; 261 km (162 mi) SW of Cairns; 474 km (295 mi) NW of Townsville; 1,786 km (1,110 mi) NNW of Brisbane

Government
  - State electorate: Cook
  - Federal division: Kennedy

Area
  - Total: 473.2 km^{2} (182.7 sq mi)

Population
  - Total: 0 (2021 census)
  - Density: 0.0000/km^{2} (0.0000/sq mi)
- Time zone: UTC+10:00 (AEST)
- Postcode: 4871
Suburbs around Fossilbrook
Amber	Amber	Amber
Abingdon Downs	Fossilbrook	Springfield
Mount Surprise	Mount Surprise	Springfield

Fossilbrook is a rural locality in the Shire of Mareeba, Queensland, Australia. In the 2021 census, Fossilbrook had "no people or a very low population".

== Geography ==
Fossilbrook has the following mountains (from north to south):

- Charlies Knob (17.7894°S 144.2984°E) 548 metres (1,798 ft)
- Ruby Hill (17.8495°S 144.3122°E) 542 metres (1,778 ft)
- Bally Knob (17.8948°S 144.3469°E) 612 metres (2,008 ft)
- Bains Knob (17.9008°S 144.3899°E) 587 metres (1,926 ft)

The Tablelands railway line passes through the eastern edge of the locality with the locality being served by Lyndbrook railway station (17.8356°S 144.4427°E).

The land use is grazing on native vegetation.

== History ==
On 26 June 1872, William Hann set out from Fossilbrook, an outstation of Mount Surprise Station owned by Ezra Firth, to lead an exploration into North Queensland, which discovered gold in the Palmer River. Hann and his team returned to Fossibrook on 27 October 1872.

Fossilbrook Provisional School opened in 1908. On 1 January 1909, it became Fossilbrook State School. It closed in 1926. It was on a 6-acre (2.4 ha) site within the town reserve (approx 17.8124°S 144.3919°E).

Fossilbrook was flooded in January 1927 following 15 inches (380 mm) of rain. Residents took refuge in the school building which was not flooded.

== Demographics ==
In the 2016 census, Fossilbrook had a population of 5 people.

In the 2021 census, Fossilbrook had "no people or a very low population".

== Education ==
There are no schools in Fossilbrook. The nearest government primary school is Mount Surprise State School in neighbouring Mount Surprise to the south. There are no nearby secondary schools; the alternatives are distance education and boarding school.

== Attractions ==
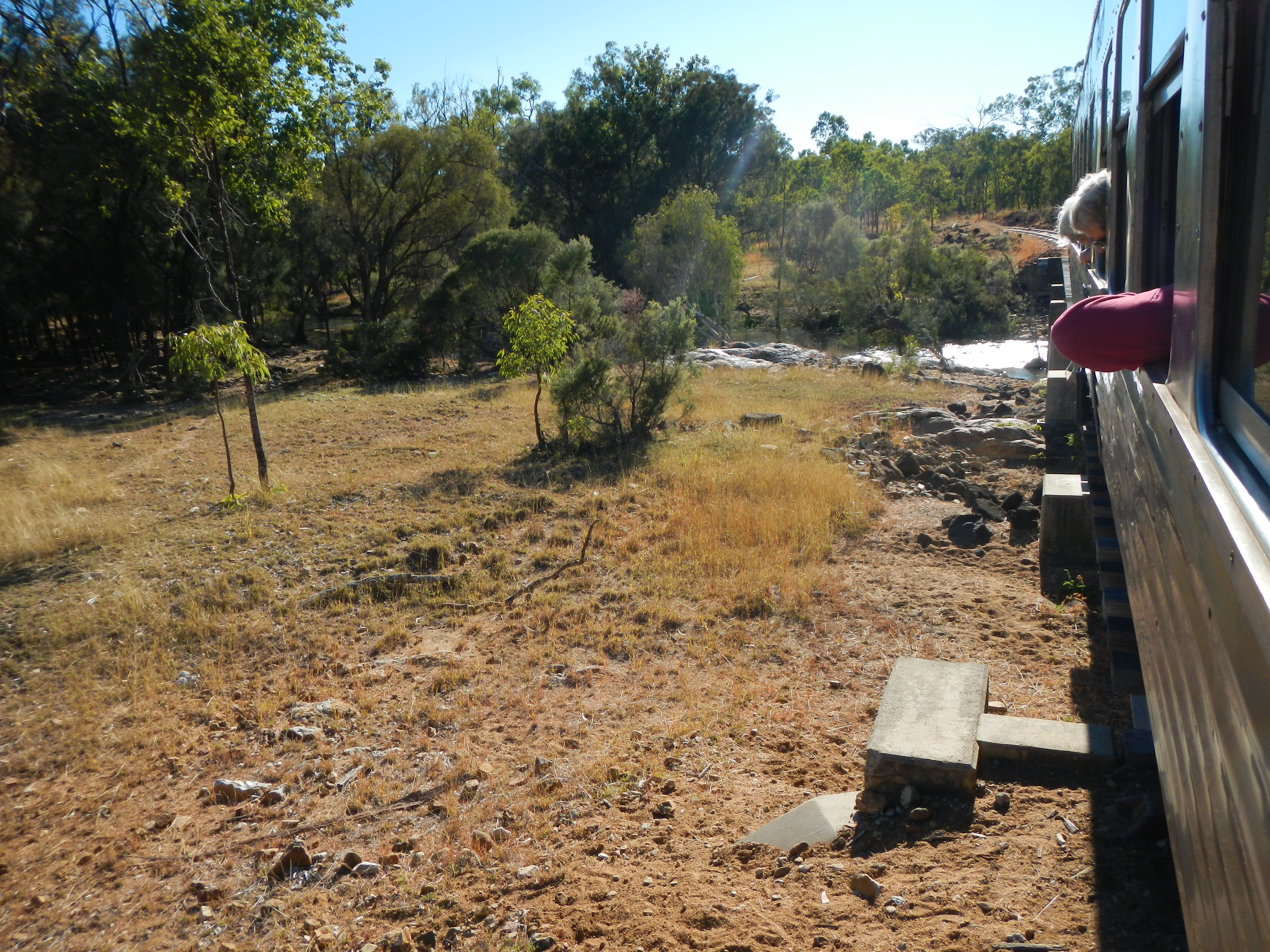
Savannahlander passing through Fossilbrook, 2013

The Savannahlander tourist train service passes briefly through the locality on the railway line.
