= Petford =

- Suburb
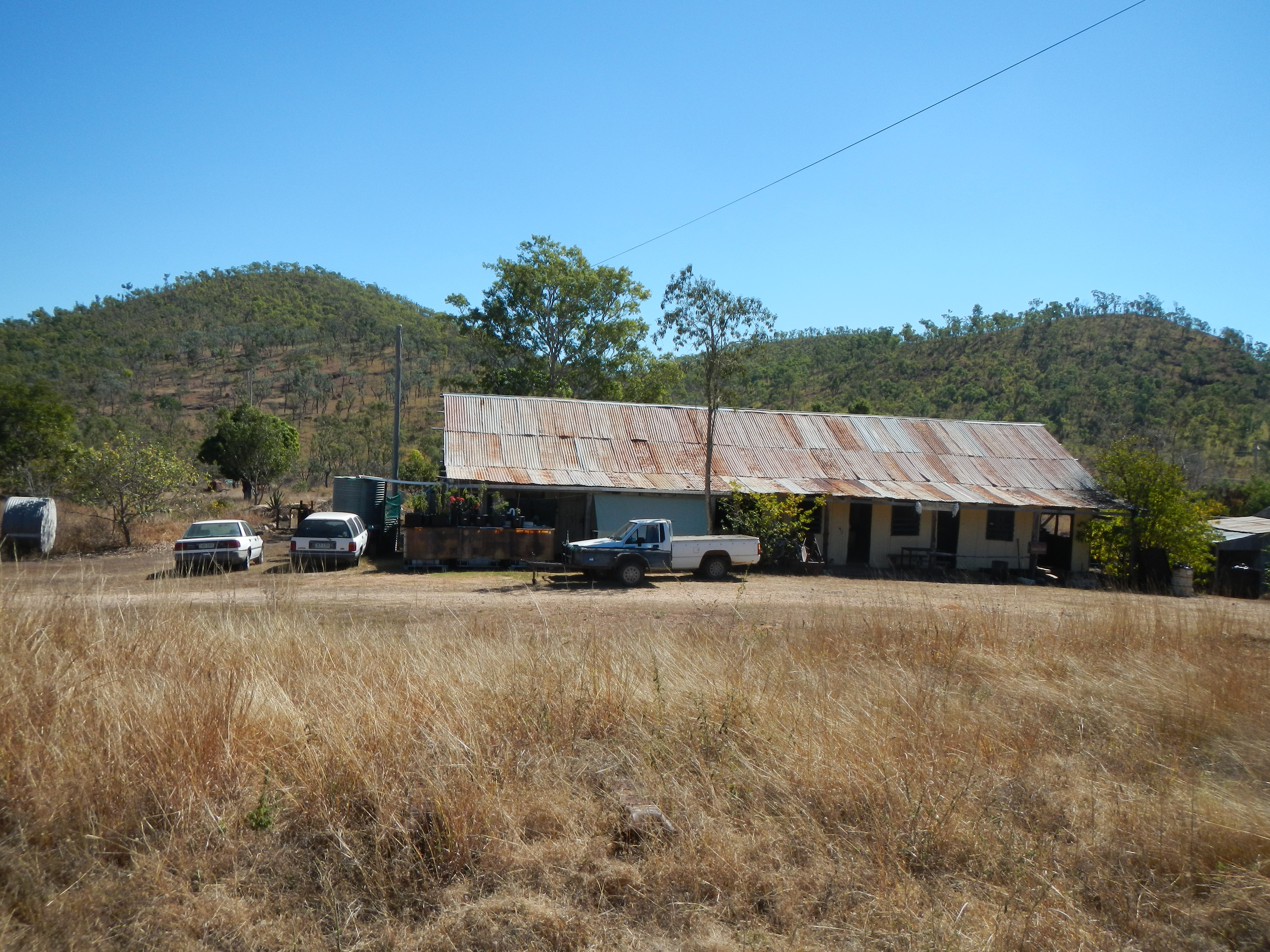
- Rural landscape, Petford, 2013

- Interactive map of Petford
- Coordinates: 17.3666°S 144.9125°E
- Country: Australia
- State: Queensland
- LGA: Shire of Mareeba
- Location: 32.5 km (20.2 mi) SW of Dimbulah; 78.8 km (49.0 mi) SW of Mareeba; 141 km (88 mi) WSW of Cairns; 450 km (280 mi) NNW of Townsville; 1,803 km (1,120 mi) NNW of Brisbane

Government
  - State electorates: Hill; Cook
  - Federal division: Kennedy

Area
  - Total: 699.7 km^{2} (270.2 sq mi)

Population
  - Total: 22 (2021 census)
  - Density: 0.0314/km^{2} (0.0814/sq mi)
- Time zone: UTC+10:00 (AEST)
- Postcode: 4871
Suburbs around Petford
Chillagoe	Chillagoe	Dimbulah
Almaden	Petford	Irvinebank
Barwidgi	Munderra	Irvinebank

Petford is a rural locality in the Shire of Mareeba, Queensland, Australia. In the 2021 census, Petford had a population of 22 people.

== Geography ==
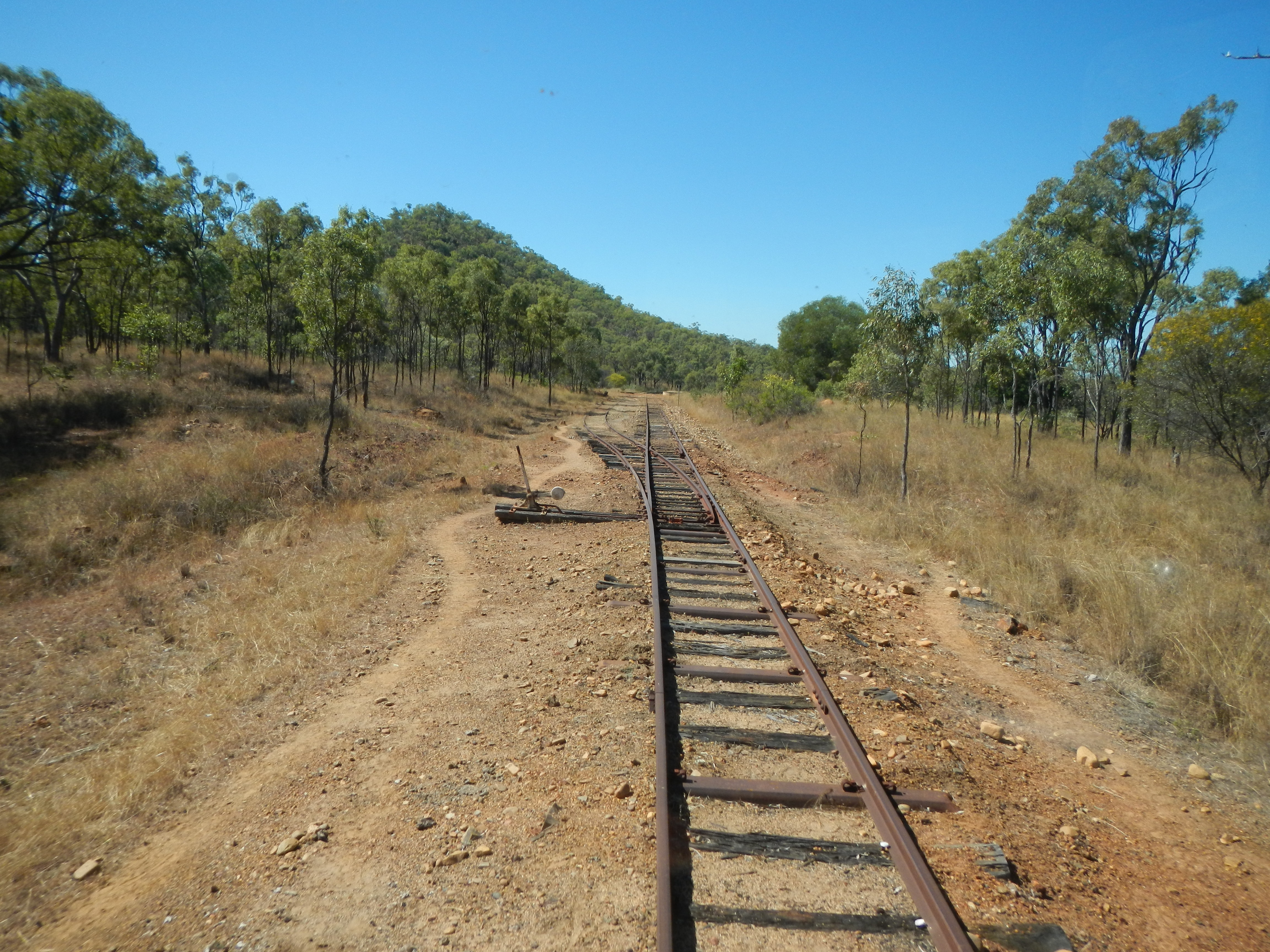
Tablelands railway line, Petford, 2013

Emu Creek flows through from east to north, where it joins the Walsh River as it forms part of the northern boundary. California Creek, a tributary of the Tate River, forms much of the southern boundary. Two other tributaries of the Tate River, Oaky Creek and Martin Creek, rise in the locality.

The former mining town of Lappa is within the locality.

The Burke Developmental Road enters the locality from the north-east (Dimbulah) and exits to the west (Chillagoe).

The Tablelands railway line enters the locality from the north-east (Dimbulah) and exits to the west (Chillagoe) loosely following the same route as the Burke Developmental Road. The locality is served by the following railway stations (from north to south):

- Cape Horn railway station, now abandoned (17.3050°S 144.9425°E)
- Petford railway station (17.3430°S 144.9302°E)
- Lappa railway station (17.3591°S 144.8861°E)
- Koorboora railway station (17.3802°S 144.8042°E)

== History ==
The locality takes its name from the railway station which was named after John Joseph Petford, an official of Queensland Railways Department for many years. The railway station was on the Chillagoe Railway & Mining Co. line from Mareeba to Mount Garnet which opened its first section from Mareeba to Lappa, just south-west of Petford, in 1900. The station no longer operates, but the line still exists, with the Savannahlander tourist train passing through Petford on its way between Cairns and Forsayth.

Lappa Lappa Provisional School opened in 1900 and closed circa 1901.

Koorboora Provisional School opened in 1903. On 1 January 1909, it became Koorboora State School. It closed in 1926.

Bamford Provisional School opened on 23 January 1905. The school closed in 1907 but reopened in 1908. On 1 January 1909 it became Bamford State School. It closed on 2 August 1935, to be replaced by Petford State School.

Emuford Provisional State School opened circa 1910 and closed circa 1921.

Petford State School opened on 5 August 1935, replacing Bamford State School, The school closed in 1962. It reopened on 27 January 1976 and closed finally on 15 December 1995. It was at 21 Bamford Road (17.3407°S 144.9299°E).

== Demographics ==
In the 2016 census, Petford had a population of 32 people.

In the 2021 census, Petford had a population of 22 people.

== Education ==
There are no schools in Petford. The nearest government primary schools are Dimbulah State School in neighbouring Dimbulah to the north-east and Mount Garnet State School in Mount Garnet to the south-east. The nearest government secondary school is Dimbulah State School (to Year 10). For secondary education to Year 12, the alternatives are distance education and boarding school.
