= Fischerton Water Race =

- Location within Queensland Location within Australia
- 17.4522°S 144.3683°E
- Location: Tate-Almaden Road, Crystalbrook, Shire of Mareeba, Queensland, Australia

History
- Design period: 1870s - 1890s (late 19th century)
- Built: 1894

Site notes
- Architect: George Bell

Queensland Heritage Register
- Official name: Fischerton Water Race
- Type: state heritage (archaeological, built)
- Designated: 21 November 2003
- Reference no.: 601859
- Significant period: 1894 (fabric); 1894-1920 (historical)
- Significant components: water race, wall/s - retaining, dam/reservoir, slab/s - concrete

Fischerton Water Race is a heritage-listed aqueduct at Tate-Almaden Road, Crystalbrook, Shire of Mareeba, Queensland, Australia. It was designed by George Bell and built in 1894. It was added to the Queensland Heritage Register on 21 November 2003.

== History ==
Tin was first discovered in Queensland at Stanthorpe in 1872. The first recorded finding of tin in north Queensland was by James Venture Mulligan in 1875 in the Wild River district, near Herberton. Gold was still paramount at that time, but by the 1880s the mining industry of north Queensland was shifting its focus away from gold toward baser metals such as lead, copper and tin. Prior to this few prospectors had been interested in base metal extraction in the remote areas of north Queensland as road, rail and nearby port facilities were largely non-existent making freight costs involved in shipping extracted minerals to the coast too high.

The first commercial tin workings in the north were, however, not conducted by large commercial European enterprises but by Chinese prospectors. Chinese miners are believed to have begun mining for tin in north Queensland as early as 1876–1877, but certainly by 1878 the declining gold yields in the area had resulted in many Chinese investigating tin deposits located on Granite Creek and Cannibal Creek south-east of Maytown.

Prospectors J. Hogsfleisch (a pioneer mailman) and companions J. Dow, J. Williams and H. Hammond discovered tin on the remote Tate River in 1878. In 1883 the fields along the Tate were worked for the first time and for more than a decade small groups of miners washed the alluvial tin. Distance from batteries, however, precluded additional development of the field at this time. Further tin discoveries in north Queensland led to alluvial tin being worked at Stannary Hills in 1885, and along the Annan River north of Cooktown in 1885.

By 1893 a town was formerly surveyed on the northern bank of the Tate River. This town was named Fischerton after the local landowner Mr H. Fischer, but is also referred to as the Tate Tin Mines or simply the Tate. By the time the school at Fischerton opened on 16 October 1894 the town's population had grown to 260 men, 14 women and 14 children.

In 1894 the Brisbane-based Tate Alluvial Tin Syndicate N.L. negotiated with Fischer for the construction of a 10 kilometres (6.2 mi) water race from the Tate River to a working face east of the town site. An engineer, Mr George Bell, supervised the construction of the race that included 6.5 kilometres (4.0 mi) of excavation, 2.5 kilometres (1.6 mi) of drystone wall construction, 100 metres (330 ft) of fluming and 6 kilometres (3.7 mi) of solid rock blasting. The race emptied at its western end into a substantial dam with a 60 metres (200 ft) long embankment. The race was completed on Saturday 13 October 1894 at a total cost of £7,000. On the Monday following completion a dinner was held for the construction workers at Abraham's Royal Hotel in Fischerton followed by a picnic the next day and a ball in the evening. Flood damage only months after completion of the race completely destroyed the syndicate's finances with the mining operations taken over by John Moffat's Irvinebank Mining Company under manager William Waddell, later manager at Kooraboora Battery. The Irvinebank Mining Company then conducted sluicing operations on the Tate during favourable seasons. This company practiced a policy of preference for public ore designed to ensure a continuous supply of ore for processing at the company's mills. This practice provided quick returns for individual miners and encouraged them to work their claims more effectively. At Fischerton the company purchased the winnings of many of the old prospectors who scratched a living from the area's alluvial deposit.

Output at the Tate Tin Mines was usually in the order of 30 long tons (30 t). In 1914 only 1.5 long tons (1.5 t) of tin was obtained through sluicing operations on the Tate, while just 5.5 long tons (5.6 t) were recovered by dry blowing. This downturn in tin mining fortunes was occurring across all fields then in operation in north Queensland. The Tate River, which had by then been a constant supply source for tin fossickers during nearly thirty years of operations, was reported to be producing meagre returns. The Irvinebank Company continued its operations on the Tate until 1920 by which time it had extracted 3,556 long tons (3,613 t) of tin over a quarter of a century of barely profitable operations.

== Description ==
The remains of the water race run roughly parallel to the western and northern banks of the Tate River for approximately 6.5 kilometres (4.0 mi) to the western sluice face area adjacent to Soda Spring and an earthen dam wall at an unnamed north-south trending creek-line. This western end features evidence of iron fluming, timber retaining wall or loading ramp, concrete slab building surfaces and associated mining debris.

For most of its length the race is constructed of a stone retaining wall, in some places up to 2 metres (6 ft 7 in) in height, carrying a now shallow clay-lined drain on its up-slope side. While the majority of the stonewall is constructed of rough angular blocks, several sections are noted to include blocks specifically cut to form a smooth surface on the down- slope side of the race. At several sections along the race, fabric changes from stonewall to a low earthen ditch for lengths of up to 500 metres (1,600 ft).

Along its course the race is crossed four times by vehicular roads (twice by the Tate - Almaden Road and twice by other tracks) and by a number of small creeks. Heavy water flows in the past along the majority of these intersecting creeks have collapsed small sections of the race. Approximately 5.5 kilometres (3.4 mi) from its western end the race intersects a large creek entering the Tate River from the north. This creek had previously been dammed, with the race constructed over the dam wall. This dam has been breached and the race has subsequently collapsed at this point.

The area 1.5 to 2.0 kilometres (0.93 to 1.24 mi) from the western end has been heavily affected by large powerful outflows of water from large underground (now partially exposed) water pipes emptying into the Tate River. Little remains of the race in this section.

Sections at the eastern end of the race are damaged in large part due to changes over time in the course of the Tate River. Much of the race here is now situated within the ephemeral riverbed. However, this section of the race still features large sections of drystone wall, some of which has been fixed in place through the concreting of blocks, as well as large sections cut or blasted out of the bedrock to form the race.

== Heritage listing ==
Fischerton Water Race was listed on the Queensland Heritage Register on 21 November 2003 having satisfied the following criteria.

The place is important in demonstrating the evolution or pattern of Queensland's history.

The Fischerton Water Race is important in demonstrating the evolution of tin-mining practices in Queensland in the late 19th century. The water race is representative of practices used for the extraction of base metal resources in north Queensland and is significant as an early example of the effort, both manual and financial, that was applied to mine base metals in a remote location reliant on seasonal rains.

The place demonstrates rare, uncommon or endangered aspects of Queensland's cultural heritage.

The water race is a rare and uncommon example of its type and is the longest stone pitched water race recorded in North Queensland. It is unusual in its size, ranging to over 2 metres (6 ft 7 in) in height in places and with a total extent of up to 10 kilometres (6.2 mi) in length.

The place is important in demonstrating the principal characteristics of a particular class of cultural places.

The intactness of the water race 100 years after construction was completed testifies to the quality of the construction, in particular the stonewall sections. While water races were common to mining areas, the Fischerton Water Race is a fine example of its type with significant variation from a standard water race design involving simple earth ditches with timber, metal or masonry linings that often incorporated flumes.

The place is important in demonstrating a high degree of creative or technical achievement at a particular period.

The structure is complex in design in terms of contours and fall. Various sections of the stone pitched wall show evidence of great effort in terms of shaping and fitting locally sourced stone to produce flat wall surfaces. Sections near the Tate River feature early examples of the concreting of stones to keep them in place as well as large sections blasted out of the bedrock to form the race.
