= Crystalbrook, Queensland =

Crystalbrook
- Suburb
- Interactive map of Crystalbrook
- Coordinates: 17.4841°S 144.3708°E
- Country: Australia
- State: Queensland
- LGA: Shire of Mareeba
- Location: 141 km (88 mi) WSW of Mareeba; 203 km (126 mi) WSW of Cairns; 512 km (318 mi) NW of Townsville; 1,828 km (1,136 mi) NNW of Brisbane

Government
  - State electorate: Cook
  - Federal division: Kennedy

Area
  - Total: 1,191.2 km^{2} (459.9 sq mi)

Population
  - Total: 0 (2021 census)
  - Density: 0.0000/km^{2} (0.0000/sq mi)
- Time zone: UTC+10:00 (AEST)
- Postcode: 4871
Suburbs around Crystalbrook
| Arbouin | Rookwood | Chillagoe |
| Bolwarra | Crystalbrook | Almaden |
| Bolwarra | Amber | Barwidgi |

Crystalbrook is a rural locality in the Shire of Mareeba, Queensland, Australia. In the 2021 census, Crystalbrook had "no people or a very low population".

== Geography ==
The Tate River flows through from east to west. The Rocky Tate River forms a small part of the south-eastern boundary before flowing through to join the Tate River in the centre of the locality. The locality is within the Gulf of Carpentaria drainage basin, specifically within the catchment of the Mitchell River.

The land use is grazing on native vegetation.

Crystalbrook has the following mountains and passes (from north to south):

- Mount Mccord (17.3701°S 144.3092°E), rising to 465 metres (1,526 ft) above sea level
- Calligans Gap (17.3702°S 144.4245°E)
- Mount Beauty (17.3865°S 144.3103°E) 498 metres (1,634 ft)
- Six Mile Pinnacle (17.4083°S 144.3854°E) 526 metres (1,726 ft)
- Dingo Hill (17.4107°S 144.4968°E) 522 metres (1,713 ft)
- Three Mile Hill (17.4176°S 144.2399°E) 356 metres (1,168 ft)
- Blacks Pinnacle (17.4711°S 144.4181°E) 474 metres (1,555 ft)
- Driscolls Hill (17.4909°S 144.4176°E) 502 metres (1,647 ft)
- Scrubby Hill (17.5655°S 144.4497°E) 466 metres (1,529 ft)
- Mystery Hill (17.6343°S 144.3867°E) 517 metres (1,696 ft)
- Emmerson Gap (17.6374°S 144.4789°E)
- Blackman Gap (17.6825°S 144.4376°E)

== History ==
Between 2008 and 2013, all of the Shire of Mareeba (including Crystalbrook) was within the Tablelands Region.

== Demographics ==
In the 2016 census, Crystalbrook had a population of 11 people.

In the 2021 census, Crystalbrook had "no people or a very low population".

== Heritage listings ==
Crystalbrook has a number of heritage-listed sites, including:

- Fischerton Water Race, Tate-Almaden Road (17.4522°S 144.3683°E)

== Education ==
There are no schools in Crystalbrook. The nearest government primary school is Chillagoe State School in neighbouring Chillagoe to the north-east, but it would be too distant for students living in the south of Crystalbrook. Also, there are no nearby schools providing secondary schooling. The alternatives are distance education and boarding school.
