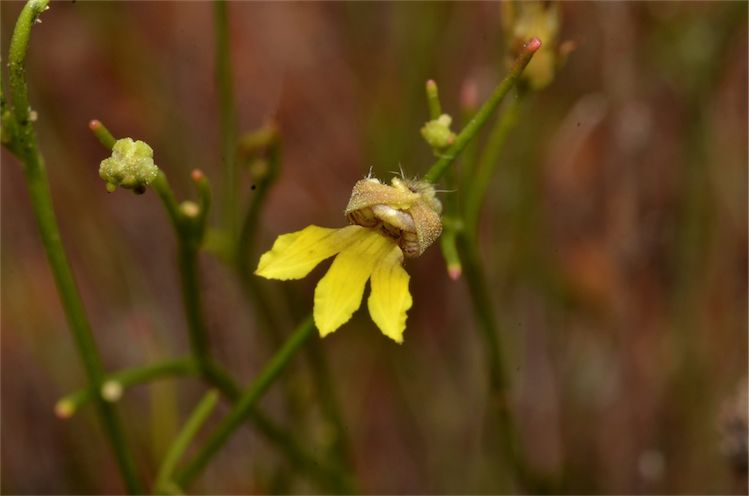
- Near the White Mountains National Park

Scientific classification
- Kingdom: Plantae
- Clade: Tracheophytes
- Clade: Angiosperms
- Clade: Eudicots
- Clade: Asterids
- Order: Asterales
- Family: Goodeniaceae
- Genus: Goodenia
- Species: G. armitiana

Binomial name
- Goodenia armitiana F.Muell.

Synonyms
- Goodenia armitiana F.Muell. var. armitiana; Goodenia armitiana var. multicaulis Blakely; Goodenia linifolia W.Fitzg. ex K.Krause; Goodenia linifolia W.Fitzg. nom. illeg.

= Goodenia armitiana =

Narrow-leaved goodenia

Species of plant

Goodenia armitiana, commonly known as narrow-leaved goodenia or fine goodenia, is a species of flowering plant in the family Goodeniaceae and is endemic to northern Australia. It is an erect herb with sticky or vanished cylindrical leaves, racemes of yellow flowers with leaf-like bracts at the base, and more or less spherical fruit.

== Description ==
Goodenia armitiana is an erect herb that typically grows to a height of 40 cm (16 in) and has sticky or varnished foliage with glandular hairs. The leaves are cylindrical or linear, 30–60 mm (1.2–2.4 in) long and 0.5–1.5 mm (0.020–0.059 in) wide. The flowers are arranged in racemes up to 200 mm (7.9 in) long with leaf-like bracts at the base, each flower on a pedicel 20–40 mm (0.79–1.57 in) long. The sepals are lance-shaped, about 3 mm (0.12 in) long and the corolla is yellow, 8–10 mm (0.31–0.39 in) long, the lower lobes of the corolla 2–3.5 mm (0.079–0.138 in) long with wings 0.3–0.8 mm (0.012–0.031 in) wide. Flowering occurs in most months and the fruit is a more or less spherical capsule 4–6 mm (0.16–0.24 in) in diameter.

== Taxonomy and naming ==
Goodenia armitiana was first formally described in 1877 by Ferdinand von Mueller in Fragmenta Phytographiae Australiae from material collected near the Lynd River. The specific epithet (armitiana) honours William Edington de Margrat Armit, who collected the type specimens.

== Distribution and habitat ==
Narrow-leaved goodenia grows in open habitats from the Kimberley region of Western Australia and through the Northern Territory to north-east Queensland.

== Conservation status ==
Goodenia armitiana is classified as "not threatened" by the Western Australian Government Department of Parks and Wildlife, and as of "least concern" under the Queensland Government Nature Conservation Act 1992 and the Northern Territory Government Territory Parks and Wildlife Conservation Act 1976.
