= Barwidgi, Queensland =

Barwidgi
- Suburb
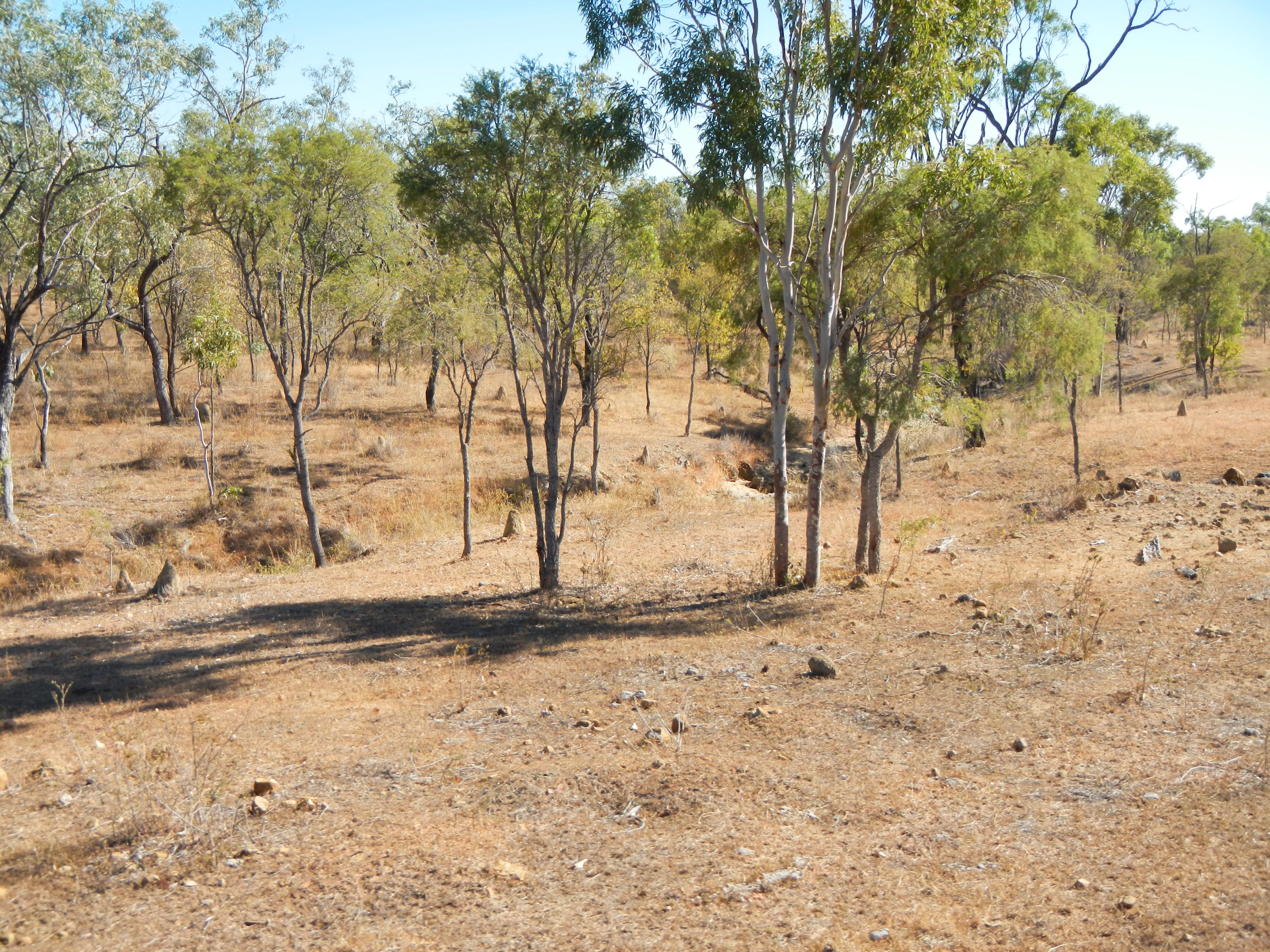
- Barwidgi, 2013

- Interactive map of Barwidgi
- Coordinates: 17.6655°S 144.6483°E
- Country: Australia
- State: Queensland
- LGA: Shire of Mareeba
- Location: 58.1 km (36.1 mi) S of Chillagoe; 140 km (87 mi) SW of Mareeba; 202 km (126 mi) SW of Cairns; 1,768 km (1,099 mi) NNW of Brisbane

Government
  - State electorates: Cook; Hill
  - Federal division: Kennedy

Area
  - Total: 1,145.5 km^{2} (442.3 sq mi)

Population
  - Total: 0 (2021 census)
  - Density: 0.0000/km^{2} (0.0000/sq mi)
- Time zone: UTC+10:00 (AEST)
- Postcode: 4872
Suburbs around Barwidgi
| Crystalbrook | Almaden | Petford |
| Crystalbrook | Barwidgi | Munderra |
| Amber | Springfield | Forty Mile |

Barwidgi is a rural locality in the Shire of Mareeba, Queensland, Australia. In the 2021 census, Barwidgi had "no people or a very low population".

== Geography ==
The Tate River forms most of the northern boundary. The Rocky Tate River and the Sandy Tate River both flow through the locality on their way to join the Tate.

Ootann Road runs through from north to south-east.

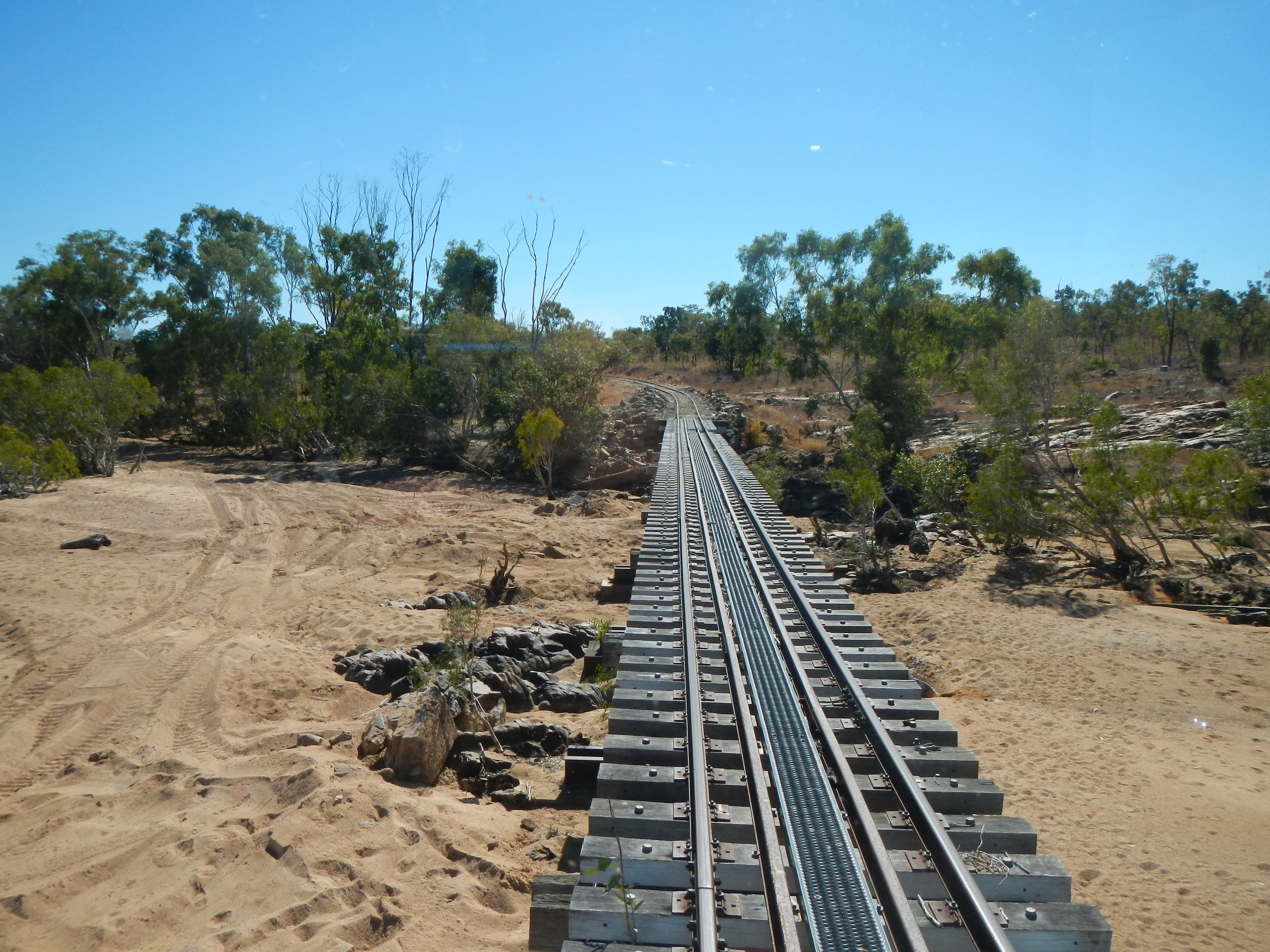
Crossing the Tate River into Barwidgi, 2013

The Tablelands railway line enters the locality from the north (Almaden), passes south through the locality and then runs immediately parallel and east of the locality's western boundary, before exiting to the west (Crystalbrook). The locality is served by:

- Gelaro railway station in the north of the locality (17.5774°S 144.6175°E)
- Bullock Creek railway station along the western boundary of the locality (17.7112°S 144.5140°E)

Barwidgi has the following mountains (from north to south):

- Graves Pinnacle (17.5977°S 144.6583°E) 581 metres (1,906 ft)
- Hanging Rock (17.5997°S 144.5757°E), 500 metres (1,600 ft)
- Mount Baldick (17.6156°S 144.5819°E) 490 metres (1,610 ft)
- Six Mile Knob (17.6306°S 144.6976°E) 586 metres (1,923 ft)
- Mount Petty (17.6960°S 144.5550°E) 587 metres (1,926 ft)
- Mountain Camp Hills (17.7055°S 144.7108°E) 629 metres (2,064 ft)

The land use is grazing on native vegetation.

== Demographics ==
In the 2016 census, Barwidgi had "no people or a very low population".

In the 2021 census, Barwidgi had "no people or a very low population".

== Education ==
There are no schools in Barwidgi. The nearest government primary school is Chillagoe State School in Chillagoe to the north; however, it would be too distant for some students in Barwidgi to attend. Also, there are no nearby secondary schools. The alternatives are distance education and boarding school.

== Attractions ==
The Bullock Creek railway station is one of the stops on the route of the Savannahlander tourist railway.
