= Abingdon Airport =

Airport in Queensland, Australia

Abingdon Airport Abingdon Downs Airport
- IATA: ABG; ICAO: YABI

Summary
- Location: Abingdon Downs, Shire of Etheridge, Queensland, Australia
- Elevation AMSL: 600 ft / 183 m
- Coordinates: 17°36′27″S 143°11′01″E

Map
- Location of airport in Queensland

Runways
Direction	Length		Surface
Direction	m	ft	Surface
n/a	1,300	4,270	Gravel
n/a	700	2,300	Gravel

Abingdon Airport (IATA: ABG, ICAO: YABI), also known as Abingdon Downs Airport, is an airport in Abingdon Downs, Shire of Etheridge, Queensland, Australia.

== Facilities ==
The airport is at an elevation of 600 feet (183 m) above mean sea level. It has two runways, the longest of which is 1,300 metres (4,265 ft).

== See also ==
- List of airports in Queensland
