= Almaden, Queensland =

Almaden
- Town
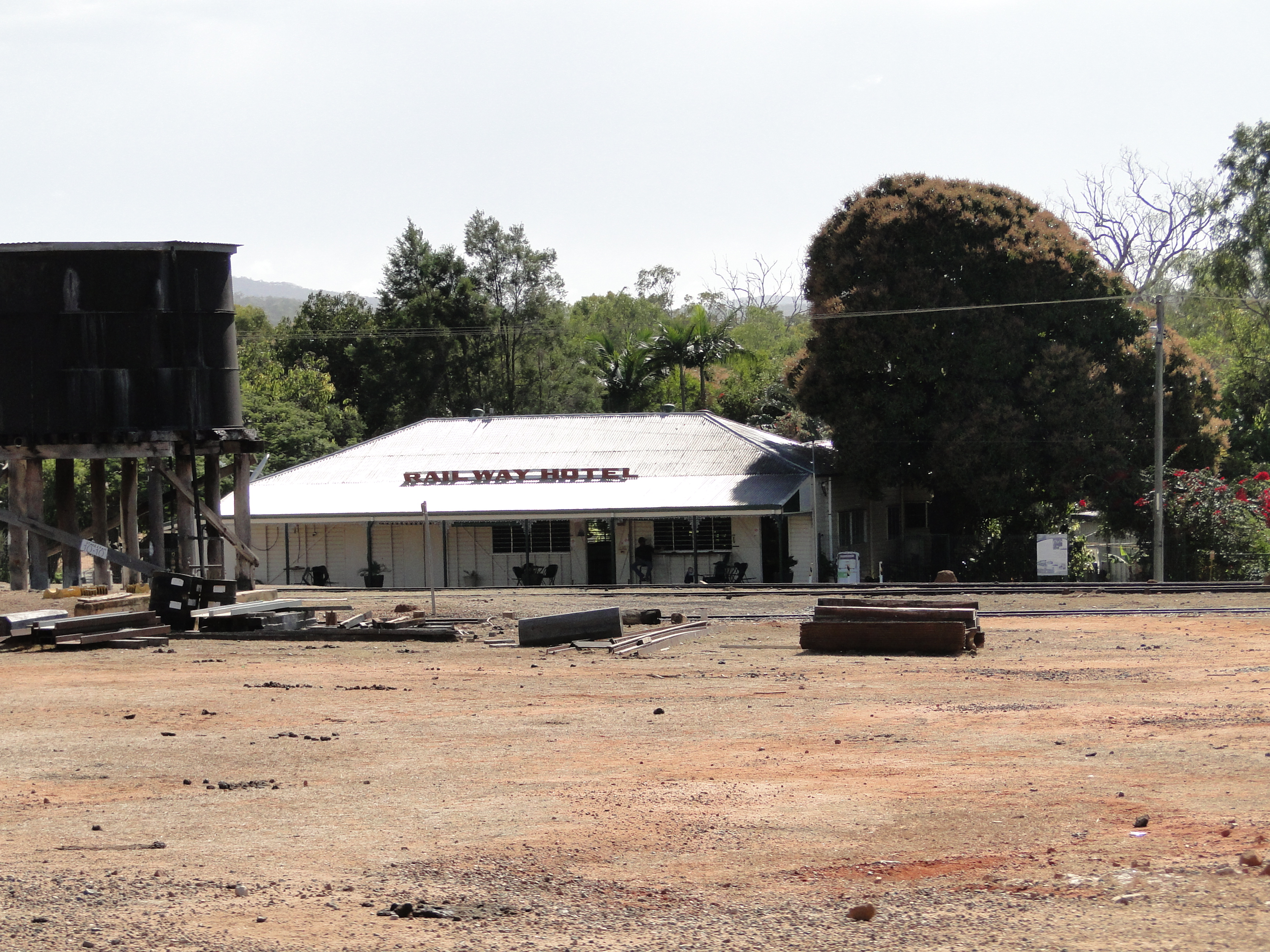
- Railway Hotel at Almaden

- Interactive map of Almaden
- Coordinates: 17.3406°S 144.6769°E
- Country: Australia
- State: Queensland
- LGA: Shire of Mareeba
- Location: 32.4 km (20.1 mi) SE of Chillagoe; 62.8 km (39.0 mi) SW of Dimbulah; 109 km (68 mi) SW of Mareeba; 172 km (107 mi) WSW of Cairns; 1,799 km (1,118 mi) NNW of Brisbane

Government
  - State electorates: Cook; Hill
  - Federal division: Kennedy

Area
  - Total: 797.6 km^{2} (308.0 sq mi)

Population
  - Total: 41 (2021 census)
  - Density: 0.0514/km^{2} (0.1331/sq mi)
- Time zone: UTC+10:00 (AEST)
- Postcode: 4871
Localities around Almaden
Chillagoe	Chillagoe	Chillagoe
Crystalbrook	Almaden	Petford
Crystalbrook	Barwidgi	Barwidgi

Almaden is a rural town and locality in the Shire of Mareeba, Queensland, Australia. In the 2021 census, the locality of Almaden had a population of 41 people.

== Geography ==
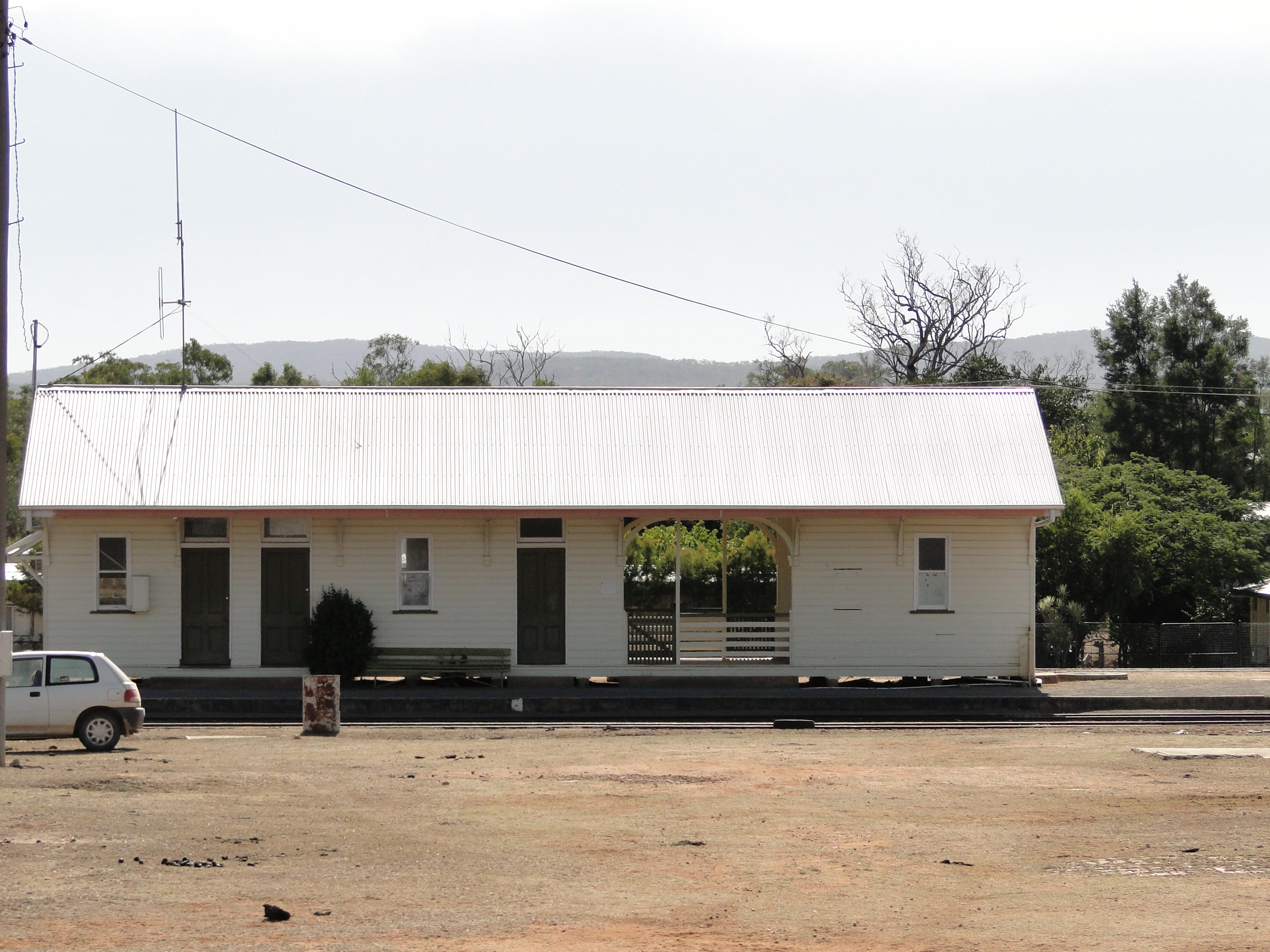
Almaden Railway Station

Almaden is on the Mareeba-to-Chillagoe railway line (part of the Tablelands railway line) which runs between Mareeba and the mining and cattle town of Mungana. Almaden railway station serves the town (17.3384°S 144.6780°E). The Etheridge railway line branches off at Almdaden towards Forsayth, with Ootann railway station, in the south of the locality of Almaden (17.4331°S 144.6385°E).

The Burke Developmental Road passes through from east to north-west. Ootann Road exits to the south.

== History ==
The town is named after the town of Almadén in Cuidad Real Province, Spain, which is known for its mercury mine. The mineral deposits in Queensland's Almaden are tripolite (diatomite).

Tate Tin Mines Provisional School opened on 17 October 1894. On 1 January 1909 it became Tate Tin Mines State School. It closed on 31 Jan 1924 but reopened on 3 February 1930. It closed permanently on 31 December 1940.

Almaden Provisional School opened on 6 July 1906 on a 5-acre (2.0 ha) site. On 1 January 1909 it became Almaden State School. It closed on 12 December 1997. It was at 22 Almaden Second Street (17.3421°S 144.6789°E). It is now a tourist park.

Ootann Provisional School opened on 23 May 1929 and closed circa 1933.

A photo from the May 1996 Almaden Races by Marie Low won the Racing Photo of the Year, for its capture of 'Up the Creek' winning a one-horse race.. The bush races have ceased at Almaden Turf Club as of 2010.

== Demographics ==
In the 2016 census, the locality of Almaden had a population of 71 people.

In the 2021 census, the locality of Almaden had a population of 41 people.

== Education ==
There are no schools in Almaden. The nearest government primary school is Chillagoe State School in neighbouring Chillagoe to the north-west. The nearest government secondary school is Dimbulah State School (to Year 10) in Dimbulah to the north-west. For secondary education to Year 12, the options are distance education and boarding schools.

== Attractions ==
The town is an overnight stop for the Savannahlander which operates twice weekly between Cairns and Forsayth.
