= Red River, Queensland =

Red River
- Suburb
- Interactive map of Red River
- Coordinates: 17.4341°S 143.3080°E
- Country: Australia
- State: Queensland
- LGA: Shire of Mareeba

Government
  - State electorate: Cook
  - Federal division: Kennedy

Area
  - Total: 2,537.3 km^{2} (979.7 sq mi)

Population
  - Total: 0 (2021 census)
  - Density: 0.00000/km^{2} (0.0000/sq mi)
- Time zone: UTC+10:00 (AEST)
- Postcode: 4871
Suburbs around Red River
Strathmore	Ravensworth	Ravensworth
Strathmore	Red River	Bulleringa
Strathmore	Abingdon Downs	Abingdon Downs

Red River is a rural locality in the Shire of Mareeba, Queensland, Australia. In the 2021 census, Red River had "no people or a very low population".

== Geography ==
Red River (the watercourse) rises in the locality and flows to the north-west.

There is no road access to Red River.

== Demographics ==
In the 2016 census, Red River had "no people or a very low population".

In the 2021 census, Red River had "no people or a very low population".

== Education ==
There are no schools in Red River, nor nearby. The alternatives are distance education and boarding school.
