= Abingdon Downs, Queensland =

Abingdon Downs
- Suburb
- Interactive map of Abingdon Downs
- Coordinates: 17.8130°S 143.47°E
- Country: Australia
- State: Queensland
- LGA: Shire of Etheridge
- Location: 104 km (65 mi) N of Georgetown; 479 km (298 mi) WSW of Cairns; 645 km (401 mi) NW of Townsville; 1,910 km (1,190 mi) NNW of Brisbane

Government
  - State electorate: Traeger
  - Federal division: Kennedy

Area
  - Total: 5,052.3 km^{2} (1,950.7 sq mi)

Population
  - Total: 17 (2021 census)
  - Density: 0.00336/km^{2} (0.00871/sq mi)
- Time zone: UTC+10:00 (AEST)
- Postcode: 4871
Suburbs around Abingdon Downs
Strathmore	Red River	Bulleringa
Strathmore	Abingdon Downs	Amber; Fossilbrook
Georgetown	Georgetown	Mount Surprise; Talaroo

Abingdon Downs is an outback rural locality in the Shire of Etheridge, Queensland, Australia. In the 2021 census, Abingdon Downs had a population of 17 people.

== Geography ==
The Einasleigh River flows through the locality from south-east to west. Its tributary, the Etheridge River, flows through the locality from south to west with their confluence in the west of the locality.

The locality takes its name from the Abingdon Downs cattle station which, being approximately 445,000 hectares (4,450 km^{2}), occupies most of the western part of the locality. Its homestead is located in the west of the locality (17.6044°S 143.1807°E) with the Abingdon Downs Airport immediately to the south. As at 2016, the station was carrying 16,000 Brahman cattle.

Abingdon Downs Road enters the locality from the south (Georgetown) and proceeds north to the Abingdon Downs homestead where it terminates.

Abingdon Downs has the following mountains (from north to south):

- Mount Jack (17.6209°S 143.1618°E), rising to 202 metres (663 ft) above sea level
- Soldiers Cap (17.6567°S 143.1751°E) 204 metres (669 ft)
- Knob Camp (17.6797°S 143.8947°E) 467 metres (1,532 ft)
- Mount Emu (17.7105°S 143.2498°E) 209 metres (686 ft)
- Campbell Mountain (17.9095°S 143.5554°E) 336 metres (1,102 ft)
- Barney Knob (17.9135°S 143.9520°E) 464 metres (1,522 ft)
- Mount Departure (17.9265°S 143.8555°E) 402 metres (1,319 ft)
- Tuccy Poothar (17.9856°S 144.0086°E) 514 metres (1,686 ft)

There is a small section of Bulleringa National Park in the north-east of the locality which extends into the neighbouring locality of Bulleringa. Apart from this protected area, the land use is grazing on native vegetation.

== Demographics ==
In the 2016 census, Abingdon Downs had "no people or a very low population".

In the 2021 census, Abingdon Downs had a population of 17 people.

== Education ==
There are no schools in the locality. The nearest government primary school is Georgetown State School in neighbouring Georgetown to the south, but it would be too distant for many students in Abingdon Downs for a daily commute. There are no secondary schools nearby. The alternatives are distance education and boarding school.
