= Talaroo, Queensland =

Talaroo
- Suburb
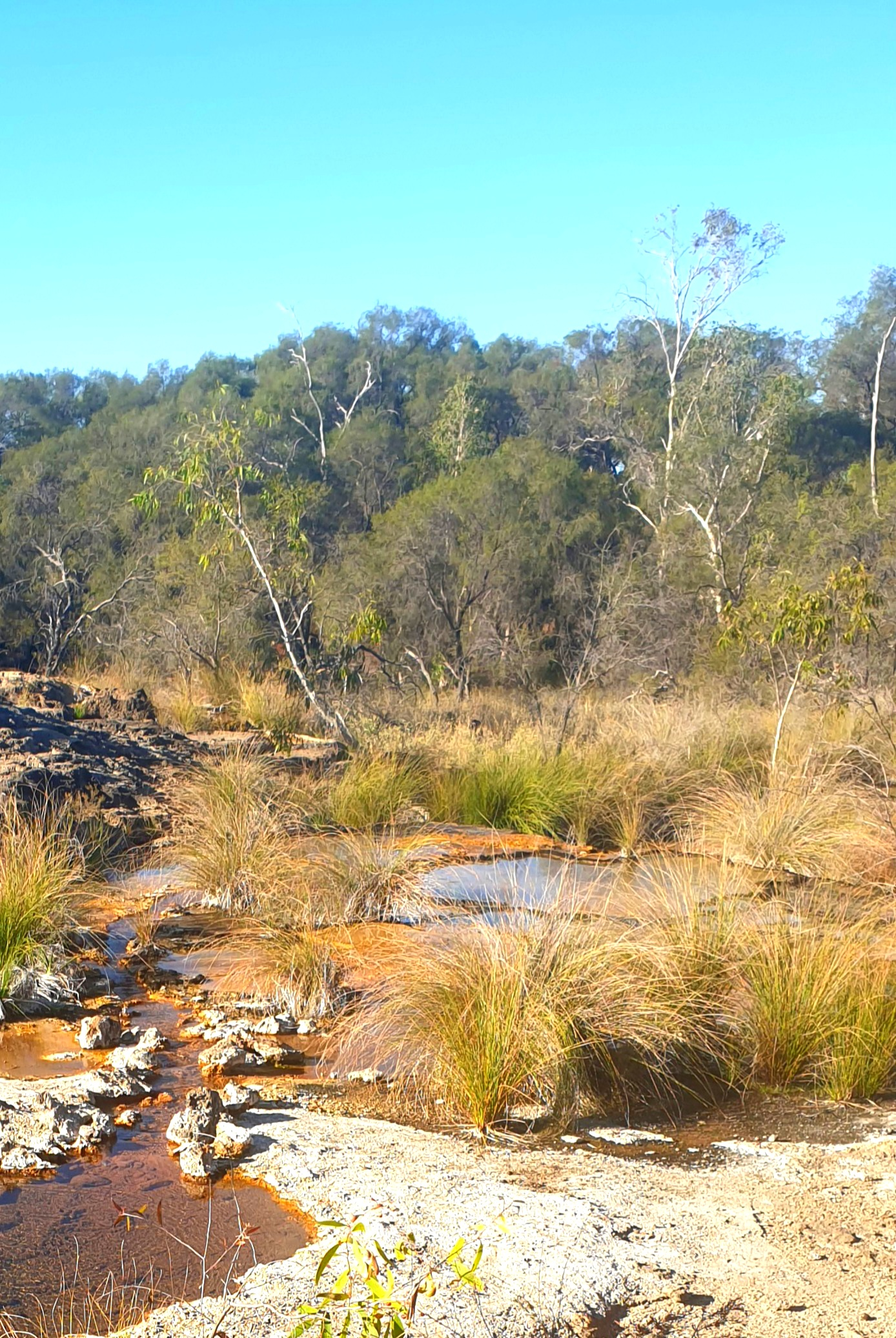
- Talaroo Hot Springs, 2023

- Interactive map of Talaroo
- Coordinates: 18.0580°S 143.89°E
- Country: Australia
- State: Queensland
- LGA: Shire of Etheridge
- Location: 68.4 km (42.5 mi) W of Mount Surprise; 79.1 km (49.2 mi) NE of Georgetown; 353 km (219 mi) SW of Cairns; 1,846 km (1,147 mi) NNW of Brisbane

Government
  - State electorate: Traeger
  - Federal division: Kennedy

Area
  - Total: 477.3 km^{2} (184.3 sq mi)

Population
  - Total: 5 (2021 census)
  - Density: 0.0105/km^{2} (0.0271/sq mi)
- Time zone: UTC+10:00 (AEST)
- Postcode: 4871
Suburbs around Talaroo
Abingdon Downs	Abingdon Downs	Abingdon Downs
Abingdon Downs	Talaroo	Mount Surprise
Georgetown	Einasleigh	Einasleigh

Talaroo is an outback locality in the Shire of Etheridge, Queensland, Australia. In the 2021 census, Talaroo had a population of 5 people.

== Geography ==
The terrain in the north and west of the locality is mountainous with a number of named peaks and passes, all in the north of the locality (from north to south):

- Mount Direction (17.9787°S 143.8779°E) 495 metres (1,624 ft)
- Mount Max (18.0134°S 143.9306°E) 522 metres (1,713 ft)
- Simons Gap (18.0203°S 143.9385°E)
- Mount Noble (18.0211°S 143.8895°E) 446 metres (1,463 ft)
- Brodies Gap (18.0372°S 143.8070°E)

The Einasleigh River enters the locality from the south-east (Einasleigh / Mount Surprise) and exits to the north (Abingdon Downs). It becomes a tributary of the Gilbert River which flows into the Gulf of Carpentaria.

The land use is predominantly grazing on native vegetation.

== History ==
The locality was officially named and bounded on 23 June 2000.

== Demographics ==
In the 2016 census, Talaroo had "no people or a very low population".

In the 2021 census, Talaroo had a population of 5 people.

== Economy ==
Talaroo Homestead is in the south-east of the locality (18.1228°S 143.9625°E) with Talaroo Airstrip to its south-west (18.1259°S 143.9551°E).

== Education ==
There are no schools in Talaroo. The nearest government primary school is Mount Surprise State School in neighbouring Mount Surprise to the east, but only those living in the south-eastern corner of the locality (including Talaroo Homestead) are within range of this school. For students in other parts of the locality, the alternatives are distance education and boarding school. There are no secondary schools nearby; again, the alternatives are distance education and boarding school.

== Attractions ==
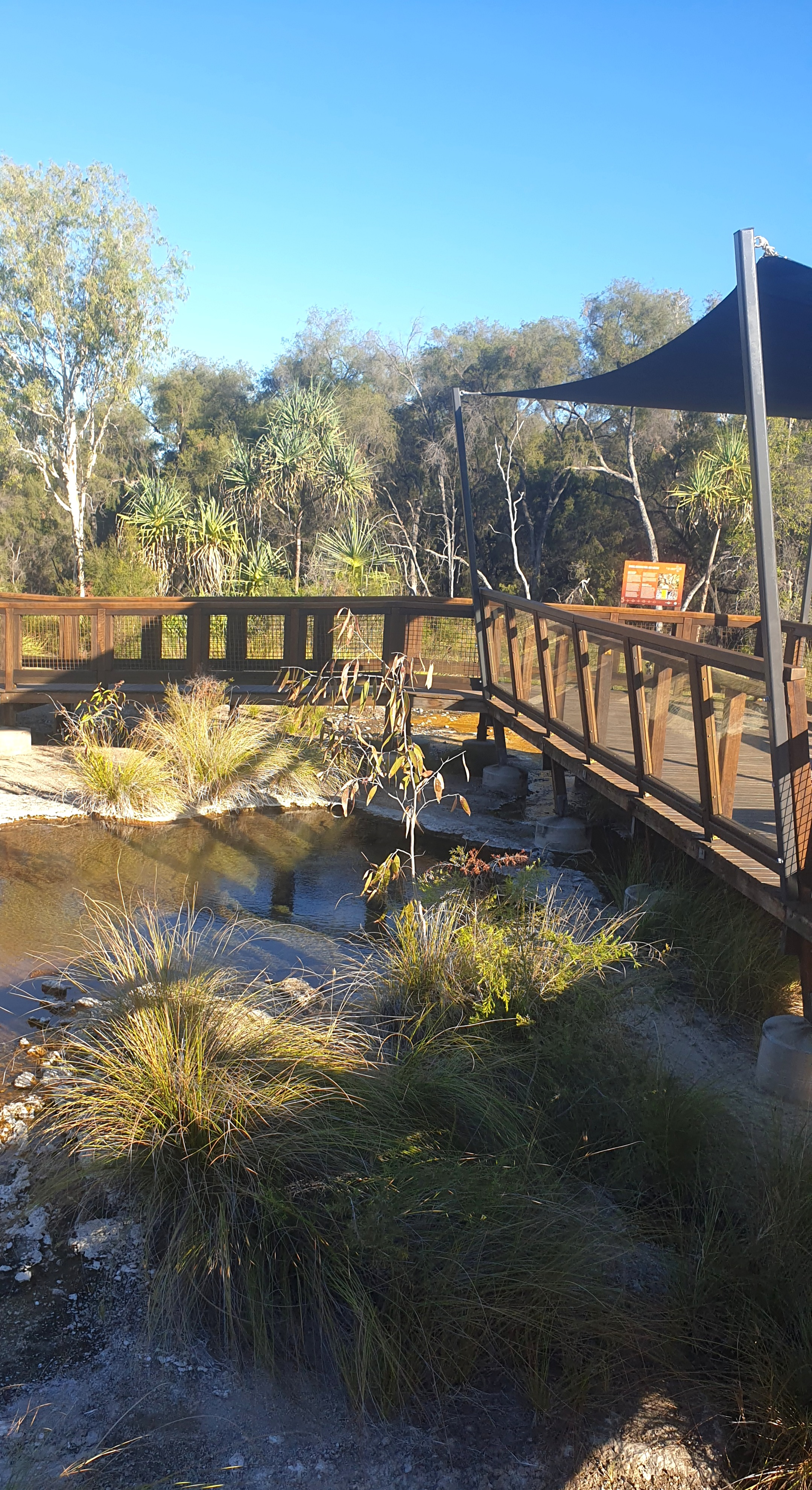
Viewing the hot springs from the boardwalk, 2023

Talaroo Hot Springs are 65 million years old. There are tours and camping facilities available. They are on Talaroo Road (18.11918°S 143.96128°E) and are accessible by conventional vehicles.
