= Aspasia Mine and Battery =

Mine and stamper battery

- Location within Queensland Location within Australia
- 18.2825°S 143.4488°E
- Location: Gulf Developmental Road, Georgetown, Shire of Etheridge, Queensland, Australia

History
- Design period: 1914–1919 (World War I)
- Built: 1916–1952

Queensland Heritage Register
- Official name: Aspasia Mine and Battery, Mount Turner Battery
- Type: state heritage (archaeological)
- Designated: 13 April 2006
- Reference no.: 602245
- Significant period: 1916–1952 (fabric and historical use)
- Significant components: machinery/plant/equipment – mining/mineral processing, tank – water, mullock heap, stope, mounting block/stand, shaft

Aspasia Mine and Battery is a heritage-listed mine and stamper battery at Gulf Developmental Road, Georgetown, Shire of Etheridge, Queensland, Australia. It was built from 1916 to 1952. It is also known as Mount Turner Battery. It was added to the Queensland Heritage Register on 13 April 2006.

== History ==
The Aspasia Mine, 3–4 kilometres (1.9–2.5 mi) west of Durham on the former Etheridge Gold and Mineral Field, was worked from 1916 to 1929, during the 1930s, and between 1947 and 1952, producing gold, silver, lead and copper.

The Etheridge was an unusually large gold/mineral field and the rushes were widely scattered. The first recorded gold in the district was found by geologist Richard Daintree in 1867 near present-day Georgetown. A series of other gold and base metal discoveries followed and after publication early in 1869 of Daintree's report of discoveries of gold on the Gilbert River, the first rush began. By July 1869 a population of 3,000 were mining the rivers for alluvial gold, and by November 1870 reef mining had commenced. By late 1871, the township of Etheridge (later Georgetown) had a population of 600. The Etheridge Goldfield was proclaimed officially on 18 January 1872, with Georgetown designated the administrative centre.

In 1872 the Durham area, just west of Georgetown, was developed with more than 44 separate auriferous reefs being worked and crushing machinery set up in Georgetown. The Durham Mine worked a rich auriferous reef down to the 122 metres (400 ft) level between 1879 and 1899 and again from 1907. It produced over 20,000 ounces (570,000 g) of gold.

For a short time the Etheridge was one of the richest goldfields in Queensland and in 1885 was still the second highest producer behind Charters Towers. However, due to the isolation, which resulted in high transport costs and scarcity of labour, and with the continuing development of Ravenswood (1868) and the Hodgkinson (1876) in competition, production began to lag behind other fields. Etheridge reefs were small and shallow, yet expensive to develop. The high cost of living meant the population was less likely to settle permanently, so the availability of labour was an uncertain factor. It was, however, known as a reliable standby when other rushes had been worked out.

The Etheridge field peaked as a gold producer in the 1890s but was in decline by World War I. However, high base metal prices during the war turned attention to lead, silver and copper and the field boomed until the onset of the Depression in the late 1920s again caused prices to drop. The 1930s Depression temporarily rejuvenated the Etheridge due to the tendency for gold values to rise during a depression, and unemployment relief funds were provided to assist prospectors.

Approximately 3.5 kilometres (2.2 mi) west of the Durham and north of Hawkins Hill, a line of reefs can be found. The most southerly mine, the Aspasia, was worked between 1916 and 1929, during the 1930s and between 1947 and 1952, for gold-silver-lead ore. Silver-lead-zinc ore was first discovered near the site of the Aspasia in 1888, but it wasn't until the World War I boom in base metals that the area began to be mined. The main workings consisted of three shafts and nearly 45 metres (148 ft) of stopes, from the surface down to at least 9 metres (30 ft). Officially the records show a production of 716 long tons (727 t) of ore, returning 37 ounces (1,000 g) of gold, 14,626 ounces (414,600 g) of silver, 285 long tons (290 t) of lead and 0.8 long tons (0.81 t) of copper.

In the aftermath of World War II, production costs rose and after 1950, silver-lead prices fell, leading to the closure of the Aspasia mine in 1952.

== Description ==
The Aspasia Mine and Battery is located 1 kilometre (0.62 mi) north of the Gulf Developmental Road, approximately 11 kilometres (6.8 mi) west of Georgetown. The terrain surrounding the battery is mostly flat with a line of reefs forming a low ridge from the southwest corner to the northeast corner of the site. It is sparsely vegetated with eucalypt and grass and is grazed upon by cattle. On the western boundary the landscape undulates with a series of eroded gullies. At the southeast corner of the site, a large quartz outcrop is visible alongside a station track.

The place contains mine workings, a battery and concentration plant foundations arranged in close association. The main component of the place is an almost intact five head stamp battery set on rendered brick and stone mounts. Concrete foundations for the diesel power plant (which has been removed) are located alongside the stamp battery. Parts of another five head stamp battery are scattered to the south west of the battery area, however there are no foundations to indicate installation of a second stamper. A timbered shaft, partly caved at the surface, is situated 8 metres (26 ft) south of, and in line with the battery's mortar box. The former hoisting gear over this shaft comprises a light bush timber whip pole and metal pulley. The battery area contains bush timber uprights of varying lengths which formed supports for the battery shed roof, water tanks and belt wheel shafts. Southeast of the stamper are the remains of an elevated tank and tank stand. The stand's timber stumps remain in place, but the corrugated iron tank has fallen and lies between the stumps and an adjacent mineshaft. A mullock heap about 3 metres (9.8 ft) wide and 30 metres (98 ft) in length stretches in an east-west direction to the north of the stamper. A line of shallow, open stopes extends northward of the stamp battery from the north edge of the mullock heap.

A linear arrangement of 3 shallow pits is located about 260 metres (850 ft) south of the battery area and on the reef line. Approximately 100 metres (330 ft) north of the battery area, on the eastern side of the station track, is a shallow shaft and associated mound. This feature forms the northernmost point of the heritage boundary.

The two shafts and series of open stopes within the battery area, as well as the shallow pits to the south and north of the battery, are located on the reef line that traverses the site from southwest to northeast.

Surface evidence of the former workshop and camp (including scatters of corrugated iron sheeting, remains of timber stumps, and bottle and tin can scatters) is located approximately 140 metres (460 ft) south of the battery and about 40 metres (130 ft) directly west of a station track. Some of the tin cans evident in this scatter carried inscriptions on their bases which read "use before 30 Oct 1951", as well as 1950.

== Heritage listing ==
Aspasia Mine and Battery was listed on the Queensland Heritage Register on 13 April 2006 having satisfied the following criteria.

The place is important in demonstrating the evolution or pattern of Queensland's history.

The Aspasia mine and battery is significant in Queensland's history as an example of a small battery working through the Depression years and until after World War 2 and producing a range of base metals including silver-lead.

The place demonstrates rare, uncommon or endangered aspects of Queensland's cultural heritage.

The compactness of the site and relatively intact state of the stamp battery, haulage gear and water tanks, is rare in North Queensland. The close spatial relationship between the mine and battery is typical of early mining operations conducted on a small intermittently worked scale. Location of a treatment plant on top of a potential mineral resource is today unusual. The very intact timbering in the mine shaft, including the ladder, and the intact whip pole, are rare in Queensland.

The place is important in demonstrating the principal characteristics of a particular class of cultural places.

The stamp battery, haulage gear and water tanks retain the principal characteristics of their type and are important in illustrating the nature of early to mid 20th century mining technology and mining practices for small mines on Northern Queensland mineral fields. The place is significant as a highly legible former mining site in Queensland.

The place is important because of its aesthetic significance.

The place possesses aesthetic significance generated by the strong visual impact inherent in the juxtaposition of remnant mine objects, machinery and workings within an arid, isolated natural environment.
