= Antbed House =

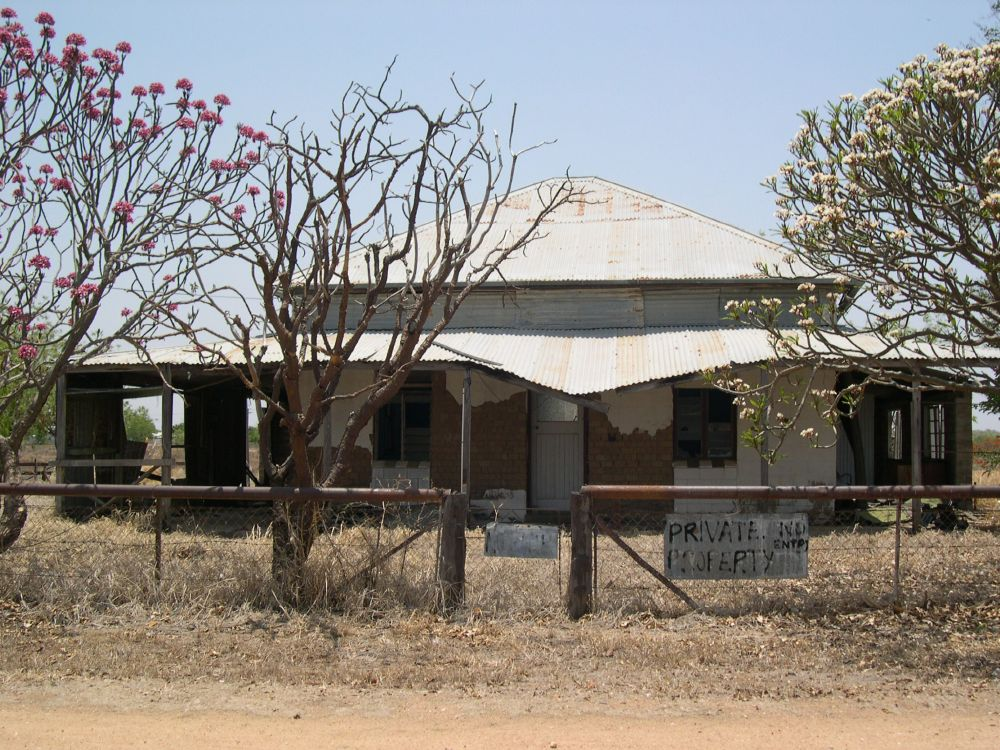
- Antbed House, 2004

- Location within Queensland Location within Australia
- 18.2958°S 143.5464°E
- Location: South Street, Georgetown, Shire of Etheridge, Queensland, Australia

History
- Design period: 1870s–1890s (late 19th century)
- Built: c. 1890

Queensland Heritage Register
- Official name: Antbed House
- Type: state heritage (built)
- Designated: 26 November 1999
- Reference no.: 601628
- Significant period: 1890s (fabric); 1890s–1910s (historical)
- Significant components: residential accommodation – main house, trees/plantings

Antbed House is a heritage-listed detached house at South Street, Georgetown, Shire of Etheridge, Queensland, Australia. It was built c. 1890. It was added to the Queensland Heritage Register on 26 November 1999.

== History ==
The Antbed House was erected c. 1890, probably as a mine manager's residence. It is the only surviving adobe house identified in North Queensland towns, and is constructed of bricks made of antbed from termite mounds. Antbed was used more commonly for floors, tennis courts, and mortar or to seal slab buildings, but rarely for bricks.

Georgetown was established as the township of Etheridge, following the discovery of the Overland Telegraph reef near the Etheridge River in 1870, and was renamed by the Mines Department in honour of the Etheridge goldfields first Gold Commissioner, Howard St George, who was appointed in 1872. Initially it was just one of several shanty town which mushroomed on the huge Etheridge goldfield following publication early in 1869 of geologist Richard Daintree's discoveries of gold on the Gilbert River. A rush began immediately, and by July 1869 there were 3000 men on the field. By late 1871, the township of Etheridge (Georgetown) had a population of 600, and emerged as the field's administrative centre. From the early 1870s, both the police and the mining warden (who usually was the police magistrate as well) were located at Georgetown; the town was serviced by the Bank of New South Wales and the overland telegraph from Normanton to Cardwell from 1872; and a state school opened at Georgetown in July 1874. Timber was scarce, and most of the buildings were constructed of timber frames clad with corrugated galvanised iron.

Georgetown was a mining township, subject to the Gold Fields Act of 1874, and sections 1 to 20 of the township of Georgetown were surveyed in mid-1874 by mining surveyor EA Kayser. His survey plan, dated 25 July 1874, indicates buildings already erected in the township, including structures outside of the surveyed sections. The Antbed House is not indicated on this plan.

The population and fortunes of Georgetown fluctuated in the 1870s, following the discovery in 1873 of the rich Palmer River Goldfield to the east of the Etheridge, and the Hodgkinson rush of 1876. However, by mid 1878 miners were returning to the Etheridge, and Georgetown settled into an administrative and commercial role, serving Etheridge pastoralists and a number of London-based mining companies. Between 1880 and 1900 Georgetown, with an average population of around 300, experienced something of a building boom, with a new court house, school, post office, and bank, and the hotels re-built as more substantial structures. These buildings were of timber and iron.

Increasing demand for Gold Field Homestead Leases at Georgetown resulted in a Mines Department survey of Sections 21 to 26 of the town of Georgetown, late 1888 early 1889, as residential allotments. The site of the Antbed House (allotments 1 and 2 of Section 22, parish of Georgetown, county of Gilbert) was included in this survey, and there is no indication on the plan, dated 1 February 1889, that there was any structure on the site at the time of survey.

In July 1889 application was made by the British mining company, the Goldfields of North Queensland Limited, for a Gold Fields Homestead Lease on allotments 1 and 2 of Section 22, at the corner of South and Haldane Streets, Georgetown. The area comprised 2 roods (22,000 sq ft; 2,000 m^{2}), and at the time of the application, there were no prior claims to this ground. Lease No.257 was prepared by the Mines Department and forwarded to the mining warden at Georgetown in September 1890. It was delivered the same month to the applicant company but appears to have been returned to the mining warden in December 1890 by William Kirby, the new manager for The Goldfields of North Queensland Limited mining company.

The Goldfields of North Queensland Limited mining company had been incorporated in London in March 1888 and was registered in Queensland on 25 July 1888, with the company office registered at Georgetown. On that same date the company purchased the leases, plant, buildings etc. of The Mining and Prospectus Company Ltd (also London based), which incorporated the following Etheridge claims and leases: Melbourne Exhibition, Spiro (or Spero) Meliora, Caledonia (Lanes Creek), International (Donneybrook), Rocky, Stonewall Jackson, Ann Day, Havelock Block and Reef, Captain Townley, and King William. On paper the company was a substantial enterprise, with capital of £100 000, but it appears to have become defunct in the early 1890s. The only crushings recorded under the name of The Goldfields of North Queensland Limited were made in July 1889, but output records of individual crushing mills within the consortium, particularly Lanes Creek and Donneybrook, were recorded through the 1890s.

It is likely that the Antbed House in Georgetown was erected in 1889 or 1890 for the Georgetown manager of The Goldfields of North Queensland Limited mining company, prior to the lease instrument having been issued. The adobe brick building was rendered externally to resemble stonework, and was a substantial residence comprising a large parlour, wide hallway and two bedrooms in the main house, with wide verandahs on all sides and a detached antbed kitchen house at the rear. Of more imposing appearance than the usual timber and iron Georgetown dwelling, this house could well have been erected for the manager of what started out as a substantial mining enterprise.

In April 1896, the Georgetown mining warden reported that Gold Fields Homestead Lease No.257, Georgetown, had been forfeited and written off, and that Etheridge grazier Marmaduke Curr of Abingdon Downs had applied that month for a new lease (No.545) of the site. The warden, reporting on the application on 19 May 1896, recorded that improvements consisted of a dwelling house valued at £200, and this is likely to be the Antbed House.

The new lease instrument was received by the Georgetown mining warden in September 1896 and forwarded to Mr Curr's agent in early November that year. However, the lease was transferred on 7 November 1896 to Louisa Boyle, wife of Vicars William Boyle, manager of the Queensland National Bank at Georgetown until its closure in July 1894, and a mining manager at Georgetown by 1896. It is not known whether Curr ever used the Antbed House as his town residence, nor for how long the Boyles occupied the residence (if at all) until the lease was transferred to newspaper proprietor Thomas Everett in February 1902.

By 1901, Everett had joined John Phair as co-proprietor of Georgetown's local newspaper, The Mundic Miner (first issued 1889), and by 1904 was the sole proprietor. A photograph of the Everett family in front of their Georgetown residence, the present Antbed House, appeared in The North Queensland Register of 16 September 1907, and the lease was transferred into Mrs Everett's name in 1914. The Everetts left Georgetown c. 1917, when the newspaper was taken over by Arthur Gard, and it is understood the Antbed House changed hands a number of times in the next three decades, although no transfer of the lease was recorded at Georgetown. Under the provisions of the Gold Fields Leases Act of 1886, rents could be paid up to 30 years in advance. It would seem that this was the case with lease No.545, with the final payment made up to 1927.

In 1946 the Aylett family, occupants of the house since c. 1944, enquired about obtaining a lease on the property, in consequence of which in 1947 the lease, then still in the name of Eleonore Claudine Helene Everett, was declared forfeited by non-payment of rent, and was re-issued to Hedley Raymond Aylett and Isabell Glenalbion Maud Aylett on 5 January 1950, as Miner's Homestead Perpetual Lease No.1441. In 1948 the warden's report on the Aylett's application listed improvements comprising a four-roomed house and fencing to the value of £150.

The Aylett's maintained the lease until 1978, when it was transferred to John Henry Butler and Christine Joy Butler. In 1987 the lease passed to Gordon Charles Bunch and Leanne Marie Bunch, then to Georgetown grazier Ian Benjamin Pedracini in November 1993. On the 1 December 1994, Mr Pedracini freeholded Miner's Homestead Perpetual Lease No.1441 as Lot 13 on MPH14038, parish of Georgetown.

== Description ==
The Antbed House is rectangular in plan and approximately 8 by 9 metres (26 ft × 30 ft) with a steeply pitched pyramidal corrugated iron clad roof with a convex unframed corrugated iron verandah which sits about 0.4 metres (1 ft 4 in) below the roof eaves and is supported on timber posts.

The walls of the house are about 3.5 metres (11 ft) high and are made from earth bricks which have standard dimensions 0.2 metres (7.9 in) long, 0.09 metres (3.5 in) high, and 0.11 metres (4.3 in) wide. The external walls are two standard brick lengths thick and the internal walls are one brick thick. The bricks are laid in the English bond pattern with alternate layers of headers and stretchers. Longer bricks are used at the corners and openings of the building. The bricks are rendered with a lime coating, which is scored externally to resemble ashlar stonework and has black tuck pointing added. The bricks appear to have been constructed locally from a termite mound known as "Ant Bed".

The timber verandah floor has been replaced with concrete and concrete is used for flooring throughout the house except in one room which retains a timber boarded floor. Several layers of early linoleum survive on this floor. The interior is open to the underside of the roof and it is unclear whether a ceiling was removed although this seems unlikely.

== Heritage listing ==
Antbed House was listed on the Queensland Heritage Register on 26 November 1999 having satisfied the following criteria.

The place is important in demonstrating the evolution or pattern of Queensland's history.

The Antbed House at Georgetown was erected as mine manager's residence c. 1890 and survives as important evidence of Georgetown's role as the administrative centre of one of Queensland's earliest goldfields. In this, the Antbed House is important in demonstrating in part the pattern and evolution of Queensland's history.

The place demonstrates rare, uncommon or endangered aspects of Queensland's cultural heritage.

The Antbed House is a rare adobe residence which survives as an important illustration of 19th century difficulties experienced in Queensland's far northern goldmining towns in obtaining available, affordable and appropriate building materials. It is the only substantially intact 19th century adobe house identified in north Queensland towns, and is even more rare for its use of antbed (from termite mounds) rather than mud. Adobe houses were rare for both the place and the period, most remote Queensland goldfields buildings being constructed of less substantial and more transportable timber and/or galvanised iron.

The place has potential to yield information that will contribute to an understanding of Queensland's history.

The Antbed House is significant for its potential to yield information that will contribute to an understanding of Queensland's history particularly in the area of early adobe construction.

The place is important because of its aesthetic significance.

The Antbed House has aesthetic significance as an unusual north Queensland building, the design of which has been well considered.

The place has a strong or special association with a particular community or cultural group for social, cultural or spiritual reasons.

The Antbed House has a special association with the Georgetown community, which considers the place to be an unusual and historical feature of the town to which visitors are directed.
