= Amber, Queensland =

Amber
- Suburb
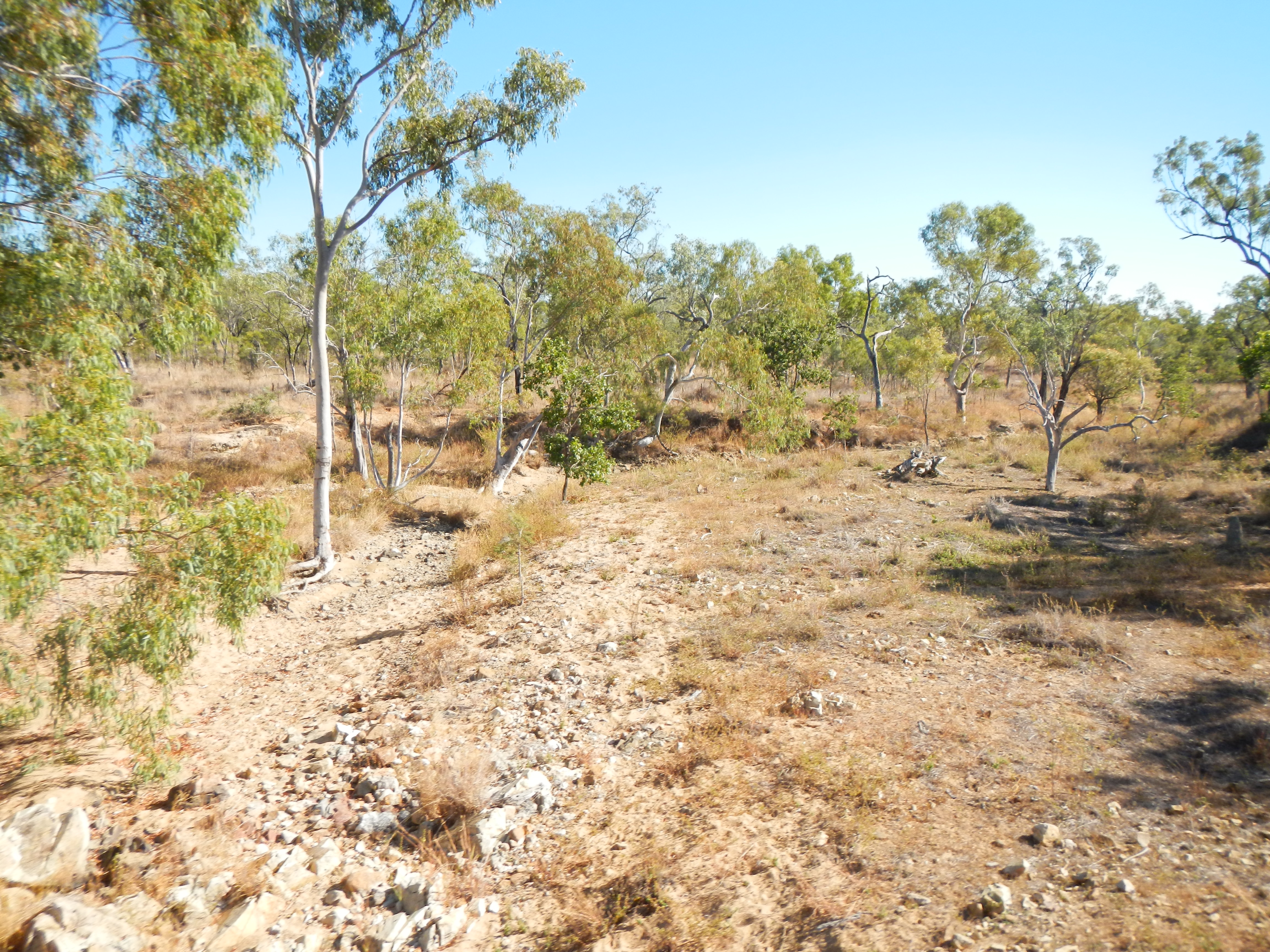
- Amber, 2013

- Interactive map of Amber
- Coordinates: 17.6711°S 144.2436°E
- Country: Australia
- State: Queensland
- LGA: Shire of Mareeba
- Location: 66.2 km (41.1 mi) N of Mount Surprise; 213 km (132 mi) SW of Mareeba; 277 km (172 mi) WSW of Cairns; 489 km (304 mi) NW of Townsville; 1,753 km (1,089 mi) NNW of Brisbane

Government
  - State electorates: Cook; Hill
  - Federal division: Kennedy

Area
  - Total: 1,032.9 km^{2} (398.8 sq mi)

Population
  - Total: 0 (2021 census)
  - Density: 0.0000/km^{2} (0.0000/sq mi)
- Time zone: UTC+10:00 (AEST)
- Postcode: 4871
Suburbs around Amber
Bolwarra	Crystalbrook	Crystalbrook
Bulleringa	Amber	Barwidgi
Abingdon Downs	Fossilbrook	Springfield

Amber is a rural locality in the Shire of Mareeba, Queensland, Australia. In the 2021 census, Amber had "no people or a very low population".

== Geography ==
The Lynd River forms a small part of the southern boundary before flowing through from south to north.

The terrain is undulating and there are a number of mountains in the locality:

- Amber Pinnacle (17.7379°S 144.2763°E) 475 metres (1,558 ft)
- Geaneys Knob (17.7827°S 144.2478°E) 493 metres (1,617 ft)
- Ixe Mountain (17.7511°S 144.4116°E) 570 metres (1,870 ft)
- Mount Emu (17.7023°S 144.4237°E) 546 metres (1,791 ft)
- Mount McDevitt (17.5388°S 144.2852°E) 551 metres (1,808 ft)
- Quartz Blow (17.7538°S 144.1898°E) 449 metres (1,473 ft)
- Round Mountain (17.7572°S 144.3525°E) 487 metres (1,598 ft)
- Webster Peak (17.7854°S 144.4453°E) 554 metres (1,818 ft)

The land use is grazing on native vegetation.

== Demographics ==
In the 2016 census, Amber had "no people or a very low population".

In the 2021 census, Amber had "no people or a very low population".

== Education ==
There are no schools in Amber. The nearest government primary schools is Mount Surprise State School in Mount Surprise to the south. However, it would be too distant from many parts of Amber for a daily commute. Also, there are no nearby secondary schools. The alternatives are distance education and boarding school.
