= Georgetown, Queensland =

Georgetown
- Town
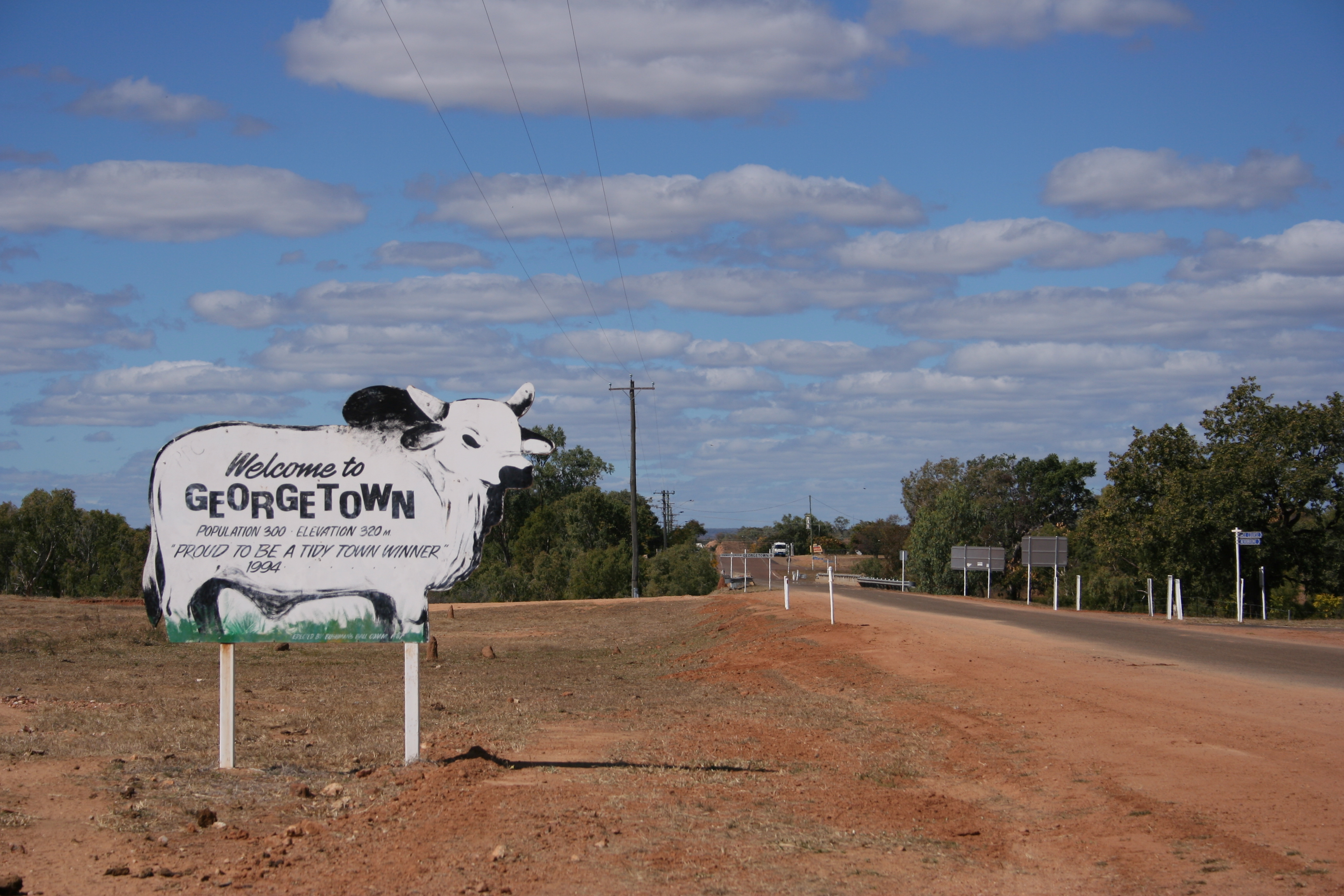
- Entry into Georgetown

- Interactive map of Georgetown
- Coordinates: 18.2922°S 143.5480°E
- Country: Australia
- State: Queensland
- LGA: Shire of Etheridge
- Location: 148 km (92 mi) E of Croydon; 378 km (235 mi) SW of Cairns; 1,810 km (1,120 mi) NW of Brisbane

Government
  - State electorate: Traeger
  - Federal division: Kennedy

Area
  - Total: 4,373.9 km^{2} (1,688.8 sq mi)
- Elevation: 292 m (958 ft)

Population
  - Total: 254 (2021 census)
  - Density: 0.05807/km^{2} (0.15041/sq mi)
- Time zone: UTC+10:00 (AEST)
- Postcode: 4871
- County: Gilbert County
- Mean max temp: 32.6 °C (90.7 °F)
- Mean min temp: 18.4 °C (65.1 °F)
- Annual rainfall: 817.7 mm (32.19 in)
Localities around Georgetown
Strathmore	Abingdon Downs	Talaroo
Gilbert River	Georgetown	Einasleigh
Gilbert River	Northhead	Forsayth

Georgetown is a rural town and locality in the Shire of Etheridge, Queensland, Australia. In the 2021 census, the locality of Georgetown had a population of 254 people.

== Geography ==
Georgetown is on the Etheridge River in Far North Queensland, Australia. The Gulf Developmental Road passes through the town, linking Cairns - 380 kilometres (240 mi) to the east - and Normanton - 301 kilometres (187 mi) to the west. Georgetown is the administrative headquarters of the Shire of Etheridge, a local government area encompassing the nearby settlements of Mount Surprise, Forsayth and Einasleigh.

== Climate ==
Georgetown has a borderline tropical savanna climate (Köppen Aw) bordering on a hot semi-arid climate (BSh). The wet season from mid-November to March is hot and humid with like all of tropical Queensland highly erratic rainfall. During the wet season, rainfall is highly concentrated into a few days from monsoonal depressions or remnant cyclones. Wet season weather can vary from daily thunderstorm rains in active monsoon months like January and February 1974 when rain fell on fifty-five consecutive days and 2,072 millimetres (81.57 in) fell between December and March, to long sweltering and dry spells as in 1925/1926, when only 232.5 millimetres or 9.15 inches fell during those four months. The dry season from April to mid-November is very warm, becoming sweltering in the "build-up" to the wet season during October and November and almost completely dry. Nevertheless, the height of the dry season features cool to pleasant mornings more typical of the humid subtropical climate areas to the southeast, and Georgetown is amongst the most northerly locations in Australia to record frost, with the temperature falling as low as −3.0 °C (26.6 °F) on 9 July 1974.

Climate data for Georgetown
Month	Jan	Feb	Mar	Apr	May	Jun	Jul	Aug	Sep	Oct	Nov	Dec	Year
Record high °C (°F)	43.5 (110.3)	41.0 (105.8)	39.2 (102.6)	38.3 (100.9)	36.8 (98.2)	34.8 (94.6)	35.4 (95.7)	37.0 (98.6)	39.5 (103.1)	42.6 (108.7)	43.3 (109.9)	43.5 (110.3)	43.5 (110.3)
Mean daily maximum °C (°F)	34.4 (93.9)	33.5 (92.3)	33.4 (92.1)	32.5 (90.5)	30.4 (86.7)	28.2 (82.8)	28.2 (82.8)	30.0 (86.0)	33.0 (91.4)	35.8 (96.4)	36.6 (97.9)	36.1 (97.0)	32.7 (90.9)
Mean daily minimum °C (°F)	22.9 (73.2)	22.7 (72.9)	21.5 (70.7)	19.4 (66.9)	16.1 (61.0)	13.1 (55.6)	12.0 (53.6)	13.1 (55.6)	16.2 (61.2)	19.7 (67.5)	21.7 (71.1)	22.8 (73.0)	18.4 (65.1)
Record low °C (°F)	10.6 (51.1)	15.1 (59.2)	11.1 (52.0)	5.0 (41.0)	2.2 (36.0)	−0.6 (30.9)	−3.0 (26.6)	−1.1 (30.0)	2.2 (36.0)	6.7 (44.1)	8.9 (48.0)	11.1 (52.0)	−3.0 (26.6)
Average rainfall mm (inches)	224.9 (8.85)	212.9 (8.38)	123.1 (4.85)	28.8 (1.13)	9.3 (0.37)	10.4 (0.41)	6.7 (0.26)	4.3 (0.17)	6.4 (0.25)	16.7 (0.66)	50.7 (2.00)	127.8 (5.03)	822 (32.36)
Average rainy days (≥ 0.2 mm)	13.7	12.9	8.3	2.7	1.2	1.2	0.8	0.4	0.7	2.0	5.3	9.5	58.7
Source: Bureau of Meteorology

== History ==
Georgetown area may have been part of North America 1.7 billion years ago based on the characteristics of rocks found in Georgetown matching those of northern Canada rather than the rest of Australia. Researchers at Curtin University have postulated that 100 million years later, this landmass collided with what is now northern Australia, at the Mount Isa region, forming the Nuna supercontinent.

Ewamian are the traditional owners of the area around Georgetown.

The Etheridge River was the site of a gold rush in the 1870s; the town of Georgetown was established on the site of the diggings. Originally known by the name Etheridge, the town's name was changed in 1871 to honour an early gold commissioner, Howard St George. Georgetown Post Office opened on 15 January 1872.

Georgetown State School opened on 14 September 1874.

As in many places around Australia associated with gold, Chinese miners also prospected and this included one or possibly two Joss Houses.

By 1900, grazing had replaced gold mining as the region's primary source of income.

The Georgetown Public Library opened in 2003.

== Demographics ==
In the 2006 census, the town of Georgetown had a population of 254 people.

In the 2011 census, the locality of Georgetown had a population of 243 people.

In the 2016 census, the locality of Georgetown had a population of 348 people.

In the 2021 census, the locality of Georgetown had a population of 254 people.

Climate data for Georgetown
Month	Jan	Feb	Mar	Apr	May	Jun	Jul	Aug	Sep	Oct	Nov	Dec	Year
Record high °C (°F)	43.5 (110.3)	41.0 (105.8)	39.2 (102.6)	38.3 (100.9)	36.8 (98.2)	34.8 (94.6)	35.4 (95.7)	37.0 (98.6)	39.5 (103.1)	42.6 (108.7)	43.3 (109.9)	43.5 (110.3)	43.5 (110.3)
Mean daily maximum °C (°F)	34.4 (93.9)	33.5 (92.3)	33.4 (92.1)	32.5 (90.5)	30.4 (86.7)	28.2 (82.8)	28.2 (82.8)	30.0 (86.0)	33.0 (91.4)	35.8 (96.4)	36.6 (97.9)	36.1 (97.0)	32.7 (90.9)
Mean daily minimum °C (°F)	22.9 (73.2)	22.7 (72.9)	21.5 (70.7)	19.4 (66.9)	16.1 (61.0)	13.1 (55.6)	12.0 (53.6)	13.1 (55.6)	16.2 (61.2)	19.7 (67.5)	21.7 (71.1)	22.8 (73.0)	18.4 (65.1)
Record low °C (°F)	10.6 (51.1)	15.1 (59.2)	11.1 (52.0)	5.0 (41.0)	2.2 (36.0)	−0.6 (30.9)	−3.0 (26.6)	−1.1 (30.0)	2.2 (36.0)	6.7 (44.1)	8.9 (48.0)	11.1 (52.0)	−3.0 (26.6)
Average rainfall mm (inches)	224.9 (8.85)	212.9 (8.38)	123.1 (4.85)	28.8 (1.13)	9.3 (0.37)	10.4 (0.41)	6.7 (0.26)	4.3 (0.17)	6.4 (0.25)	16.7 (0.66)	50.7 (2.00)	127.8 (5.03)	822 (32.36)
Average rainy days (≥ 0.2 mm)	13.7	12.9	8.3	2.7	1.2	1.2	0.8	0.4	0.7	2.0	5.3	9.5	58.7
Source: Bureau of Meteorology

== Heritage listings ==
Georgetown has a number of heritage-listed sites, including:

- Aspasia Mine and Battery, Gulf Developmental Road
- Antbed House, South Street

== Education ==
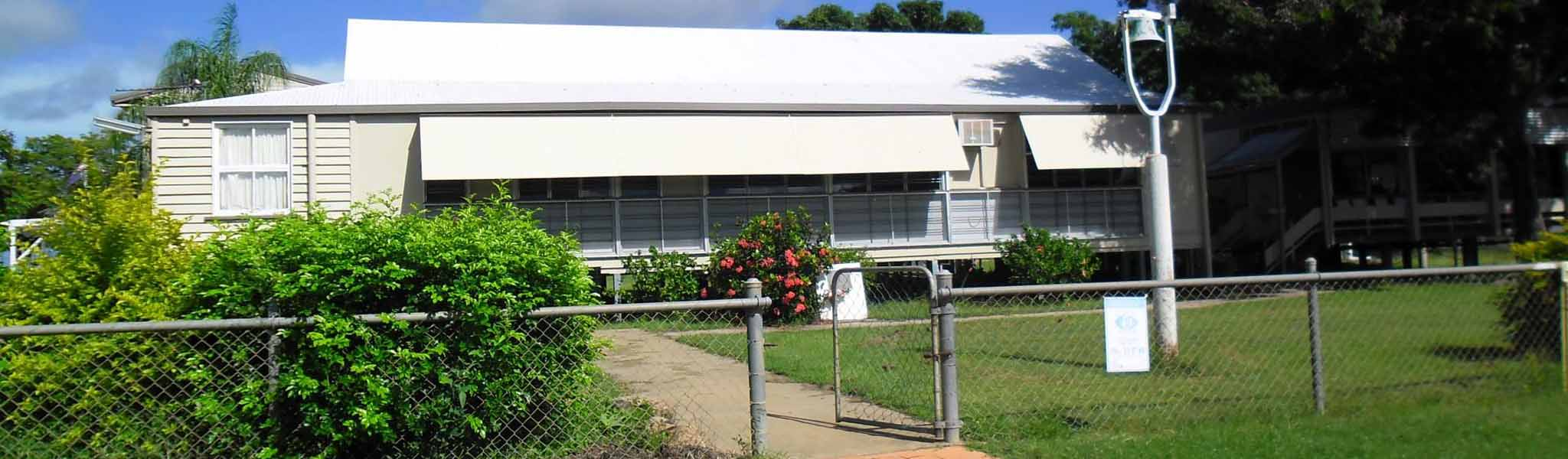
Georgetown State School, 2024

Georgetown State School is a government primary (Early Childhood to Year 6) school for boys and girls at High Street (18.2947°S 143.5473°E). In 2014, Georgetown State School had an enrolment of 57 students with 3 teachers. In 2018, the school had an enrolment of 42 students with 4 teachers (3 full-time equivalent) and 7 non-teaching staff (4 full-time equivalent).

There are no secondary schools in Georgetown, nor nearby. The options are distance education and boarding school.

== Facilities ==
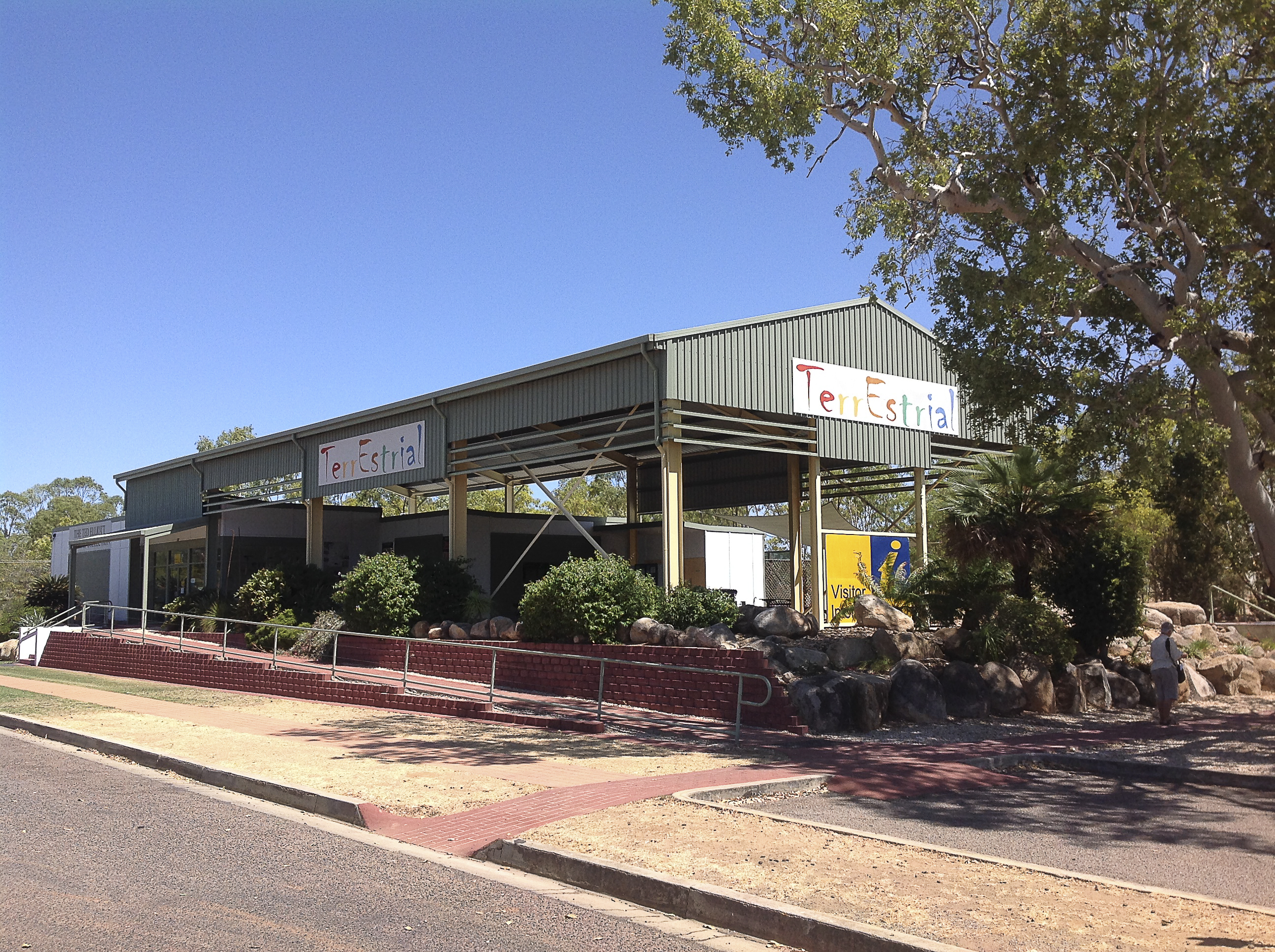
Georgetown Terrestrial Information Centre

Georgetown has a racecourse, swimming pool and a tourist information centre and camping/caravan park.

The Etheridge Shire Council operates a public library at Low Street, Georgetown.

The Georgetown branch of the Queensland Country Women's Association has its rooms on the Gulf Developmental Road.

The Terrestrial Information Centre contains the Ted Elliot Mineral Collection, comprising over 4500 local and international mineral specimens.

St Patrick's Catholic Church is at 26 High Street. It is within the Gulf Savannah Parish of the Roman Catholic Diocese of Cairns.

== In popular culture ==
Georgetown is one of the real locations mentioned several times in the novel A Town Like Alice by Nevil Shute.
