= William Hann =

British explorer (1837 - 1889)

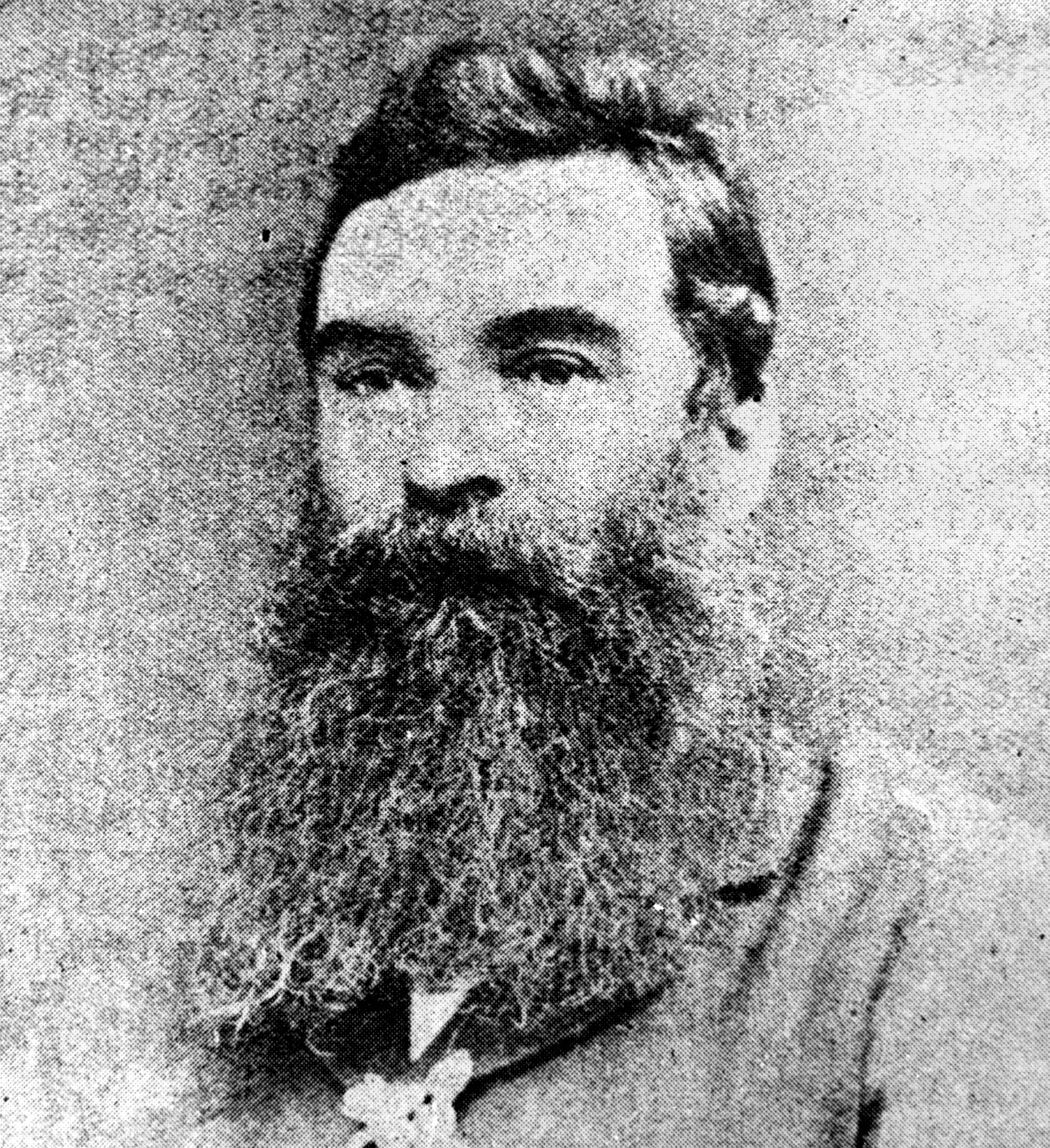
William Hann

William Hann (26 February 1837 – 5 April 1889) was a pastoralist and explorer in northern Queensland, Australia. His expedition in 1872 found the first indications of the Palmer River goldfield.

== Early life ==
He was born in Wiltshire, England, on 26 February 1837. Fellow explorer Frank Hann was his younger brother.

== North Queensland exploration ==
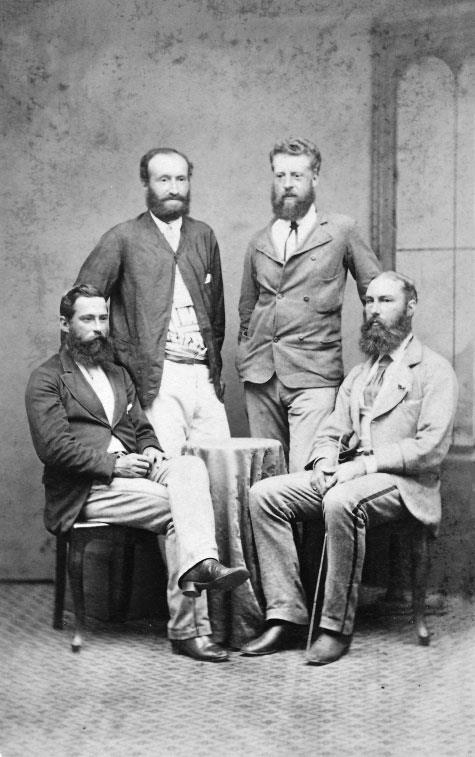
From left: William Hann (leader), Frederick Warner (surveyor), Dr Thomas Tate (naturalist) and Norman Taylor (geologist)

In 1871, Hann wrote to the Queensland minister for public works and goldfields William Henry Walsh with the proposition of a northern expedition. In Brisbane in early 1872, Hann presented geological specimens and attended a meeting with Premier Arthur Hunter Palmer and the colonial secretary about the proposal. In February 1872 the Queensland government approved the proposal for an expedition with the aim of: 'ascertaining, as far north as the 14th parallel of latitude, the character of the country and its mineral resources, with the view to future settlement and occupation.'

The expedition members consisted of:

- William Hann (1837–89) – expedition leader
- Jerry (1852–1942) – Indigenous guide and translator
- Norman Taylor (1834–94) – geologist
- Thomas Tate (1842–1934) – naturalist and botanist
- Frederick Horatio Warner (1842–1906) – surveyor
- William Nation (1818–74) – pastoralist and bushman
- William Robert Stewart – pastoralist and bushman

On 26 June 1872, their journey began with fifteen packhorses, ten spare horses, twenty sheep and five months' supplies of flour, tea, sugar, rice, potatoes and dried apples. Hann set out from Fossilbrook, an outstation of Mount Surprise Station owned by Ezra Firth.

In early August the expedition encountered a waterway which they named the Palmer River after the Colonial Secretary of Queensland, Arthur Hunter Palmer. Gold was found in a nearby gully by Frederick Warner the expedition's surveyor on 6 August and further deposits were located on following days. They also surprised a camp of sleeping local Aboriginal residents who were terrified by Hann's presence. The group travelled further north and east, naming the Coleman River, Stewart River and Normanby River. They encountered numerous native people along their journey and the botanist of the expedition brought an Aboriginal boy into their group. Although Hann believed the boy came willingly, the relatives of the child clearly displayed their displeasure at his removal. Conflict was initially avoided by the return of the boy; however, on the next day, the Aboriginal people went on the offensive, throwing spears upon Hann's camp, to which Hann responded with a couple of gunfire shots that ended the dispute.

In late September the exploratory group travelled to the mouth of the Endeavour River and soon became lost for a number of weeks in the rainforests around Cape Tribulation. The Aboriginal residents were very numerous and Hann retreated back through to the Normanby River and Kennedy River regions. When their camp was visited at night, Hann thought it necessary to disperse them with a "shot or two". On 27 October, they had returned to the Palmer River and in early November they reached their initial starting point of Fossilbrook where Hann made a report of his findings.

The expedition found numerous marine cephalopod fossils including Peratobelus, and several ammonites (Aconeceras Toxoceratoides and Tropaeum) various bivalve and scaphopod molluscs and a crustacean Enoploclytia. Warner found Ichthyosaur vertebrae.

During the expedition Hann named the waterways: Tate River, Walsh River, Nonda Creek, Elizabeth Creek; Garnett Creek; Palmer River; Coleman River, Stewart River, Normanby River, Oaky Creek and Hearn River. He also named the geographic locations of Taylor's Carboniferous Range, Mt Mulgrave, Mt Daintree, Mt Taylor, Jessie's Tableland, Mt Newberry and Mt McDevitt.

Hann's expedition enabled James Venture Mulligan to conduct a gold-prospecting journey to the Palmer River in the following year which resulted in the unearthing of 102 ounces of gold. This in turn led to the gold rush on the Palmer River Goldfields.

== Death ==
A death notice from The Queenslander, Brisbane, dated 11 May 1889 said:

"HANN--On the 5th April, William HANN, of Maryvale, North Queensland, accidentally drowned whilst bathing in the sea at Townsville, leaving a wife and two daughters to mourn the loss of an affectionate husband and loving father, aged 52."

In addition to the above death notice, the following article appeared in the Brisbane Courier, dated 6 April 1889, suggesting that the drowning was not accidental and took place at night.

"A Townsville telegram dated 5 April states that William Hann of Maryvale Station, one of the oldest of the northern pioneers, committed suicide by drowning, in the bay in front of the Queen's Hotel during Thursday night."

== Legacy ==
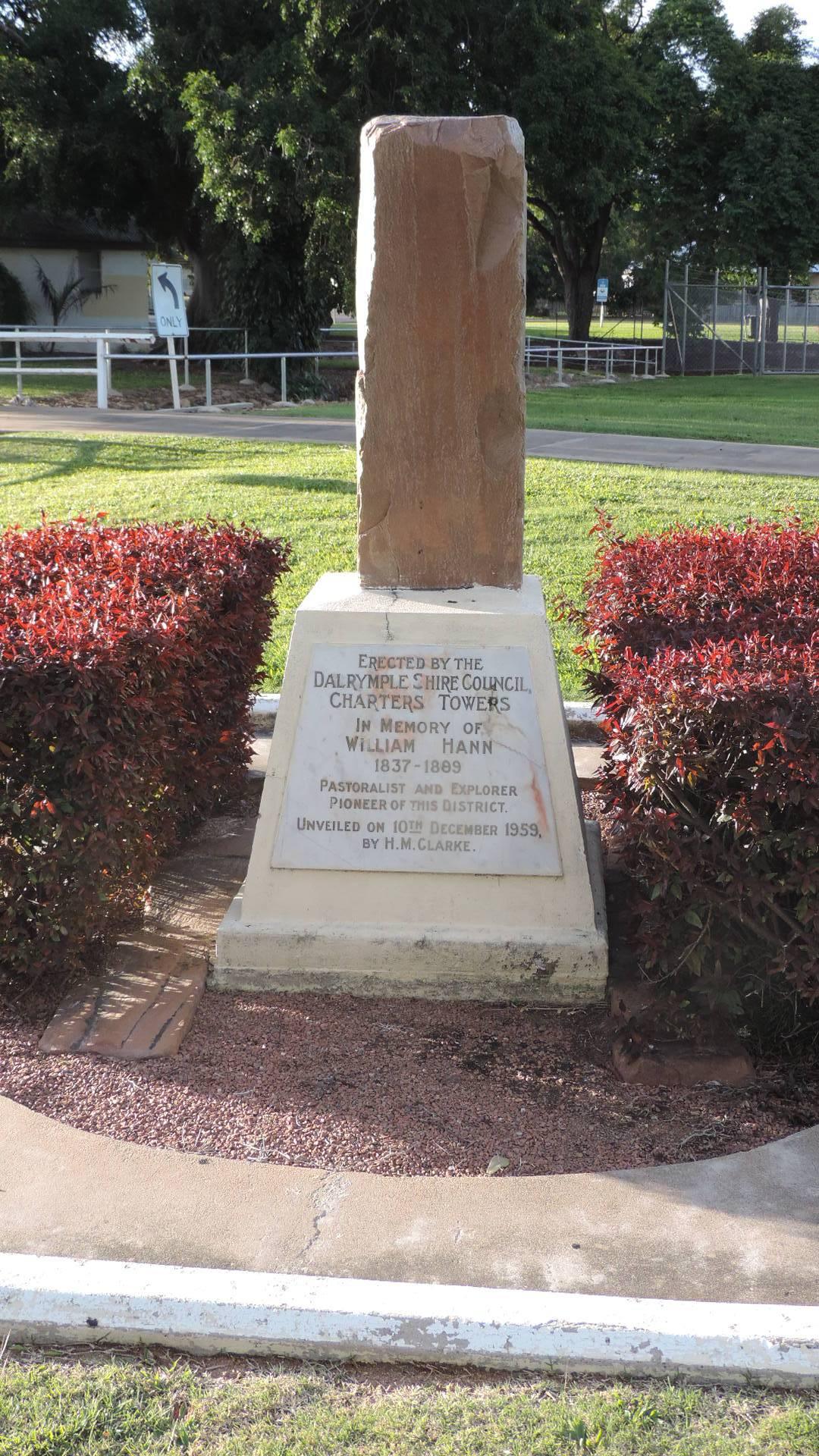
Memorial to William Hann, Lissner Park, 2016

A memorial to William Hann was erected in 1959 in Lissner Park in Charters Towers. The stone used in the memorial was taken from Basalt River near the Bluff Downs homestead where William Hann first settled.

Queensland's Hann River is named after him.
