= Lynd River =

River in Queensland, Australia

Lynd
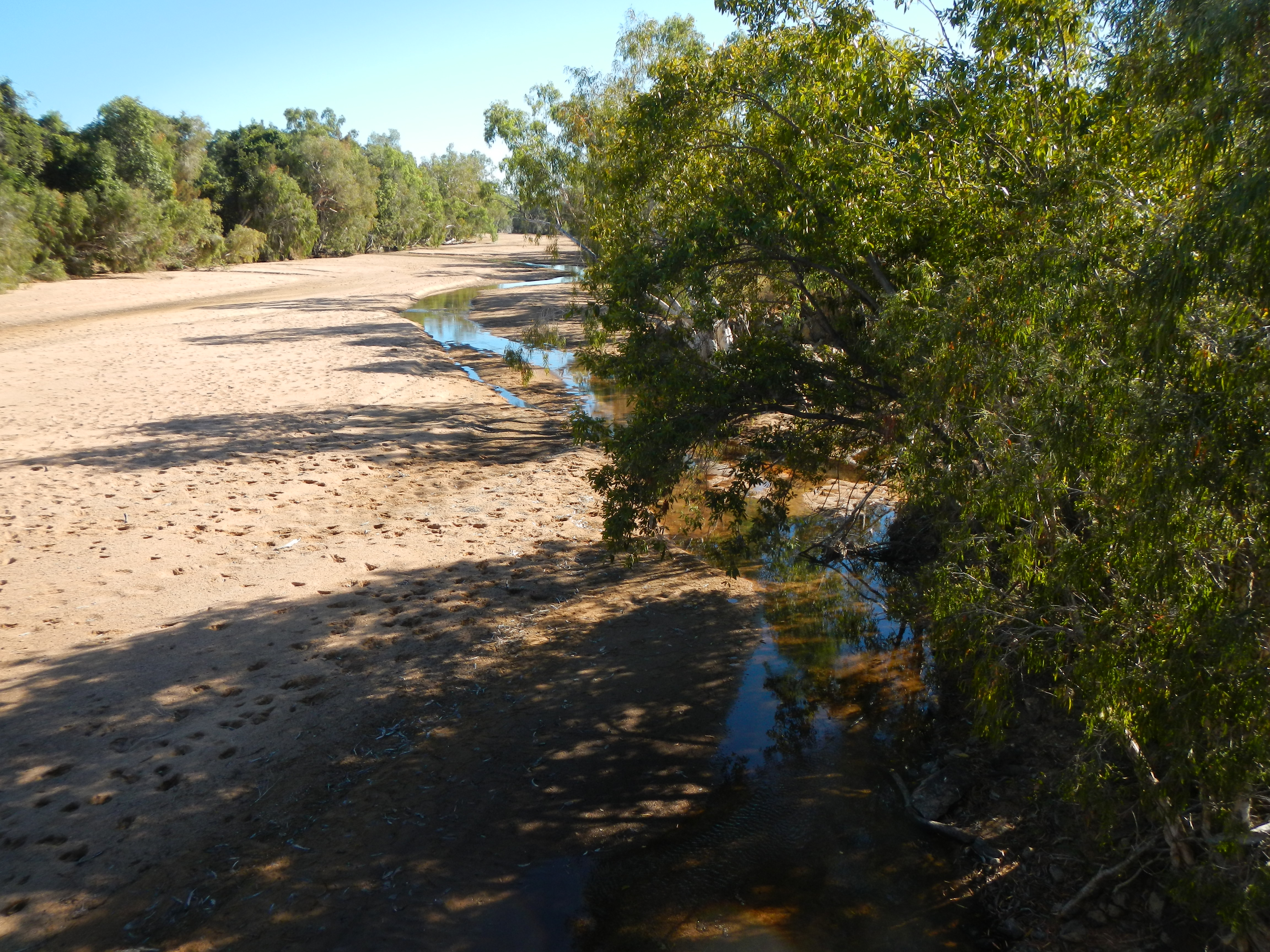
- Lynd River, Amber, 2013

- Location of Lynd River mouth in Queensland
- Etymology: In honour of Robert Lynd

Location
- Country: Australia
- State: Queensland
- Region: Far North Queensland

Physical characteristics
- Source: Great Dividing Range
  - location: below Mount Poole
  - elevation: 742 m (2,434 ft)
- Mouth: confluence with the Mitchell River
  - location: Highbury
  - coordinates: 16°27′50″S 143°18′28″E
  - elevation: 96 m (315 ft)
- Length: 323 km (201 mi)

Basin features
- River system: Mitchell River catchment
- Tributaries
  - right: Tate River
- National park: Forty Mile Scrub National Park

The Lynd River is a river on the Cape York Peninsula in the Shire of Mareeba in Far North Queensland, Australia.

== Course and features ==
The headwaters of the river rise in the Forty Mile Scrub National Park in the Great Dividing Range and flows in a north westerly direction. It flows down the range and onto the plains of the Gulf Country past cattle stations such Torwood, The Lake outstation and Bulimba. Continuing north it discharges into the Mitchell River near Staaten River National Park. From source to mouth, the Lynd River is joined by twenty tributaries including the Tate River, descending 647 metres (2,123 ft) over its 323-kilometre (201 mi) course. In its upper reaches, the river is crossed by the Kennedy Highway.

The Mitchell River Fan Aggregation, a 7,149-square-kilometre (2,760 sq mi) freshwater wetland area located approximately south east of Kowanyama, is fed by the Mitchell, Palmer and Lynd Rivers.

Riparian vegetation found along the river include Melaleuca fluviatilis, Casuarina cunninghamiana, Pandanus spiralis and Ficus racemosa which provide most of the cover.

The traditional owners of the upper catchment area are the Kunjen peoples.

== Etymology ==
The river was named in 1844 in honour of Lieutenant Robert Lynd of the 63rd Regiment of the British Army by Ludwig Leichhardt during Leichhardt's expedition from Queensland to Port Essington. Lynd was a benefactor of Leichhardt's, and assisted him both socially and financially. William Hann also passed through the area as part of his 1872 expedition camping along the river before moving on to the Palmer River.

== See also ==
- List of rivers of Australia § Queensland
