= Tate River =

River in Queensland, Australia

Tate
- Location of Tate River mouth in Queensland
- Etymology: In honour of Thomas Tate

Location
- Country: Australia
- State: Queensland
- Region: Far North Queensland

Physical characteristics
- Source: Great Dividing Range
- Source confluence: Packsaddle Creek and California Creek
  - location: below Three Mile Mountain
  - coordinates: 17°33′38″S 144°44′58″E
  - elevation: 452 m (1,483 ft)
- Mouth: confluence with the Lynd River
  - location: west of Torwood
  - coordinates: 17°21′49″S 143°44′00″E
  - elevation: 194 m (636 ft)
- Length: 130 km (81 mi)

Basin features
- River system: Mitchell River catchment

The Tate River is a river in Far North Queensland, Australia.

The headwaters of the river rise under Three Mile Mountain in the Great Dividing Range. Formed by the confluence of the Packsaddle Creek and California Creek, the river flows east through the Bullings Claim mineral occurrence and several mine sites, joined by nine tributaries including the Rocky Tate River and Sandy Tate River. The river eventually discharges into the Lynd River, west of Torwood. Eventually the Lynd discharges into the Mitchell River. The Tate River descends 258 metres (846 ft) over its 130-kilometre (81 mi) course.

The river was named in 1872 in honour of the explorer and botanist, Thomas Tate, by the explorer and leader of his expedition, William Hann.

== See also ==
- List of rivers of Australia § Queensland
