= Yagoonya, Queensland =

Yagoonya
- Suburb
- Interactive map of Yagoonya
- Coordinates: 16.4708°S 141.5705°E
- Country: Australia
- State: Queensland
- LGA: Shire of Carpentaria
- Location: 135.5 km (84.2 mi) NE of Normanton; 633 km (393 mi) NE of Mount Isa; 675 km (419 mi) W of Cairns; 2,157 km (1,340 mi) NW of Brisbane

Government
  - State electorates: Traeger; Cook
  - Federal divisions: Kennedy; Leichhardt

Area
  - Total: 11,023.9 km^{2} (4,256.4 sq mi)

Population
  - Total: 20 (2021 census)
  - Density: 0.0018/km^{2} (0.0047/sq mi)
- Time zone: UTC+10:00 (AEST)
- Postcode: 4871
Suburbs around Yagoonya
Gulf of Carpentaria	Kowanyama	Maramie
Gulf of Carpentaria	Yagoonya	Maramie
Howitt	Howitt	Staaten; Strathmore

Yagoonya is a coastal locality in the Shire of Carpentaria, Queensland, Australia. In the 2021 census, Yagoonya had a population of 20 people.

== Geography ==
Yangoonya is on the west coast of the Cape York Peninsula facing the Gulf of Carpentaria. The Burke Developmental Road passes through the locality from north to south.

The terrain ranges from 10 to 70 metres (33 to 230 ft) above sea level. The land use of the central and southern parts of the locality is grazing on native vegetation.

== History ==
Originally called Yagoona, the name was changed to Yagoonya on 7 June 2002.

== Demographics ==
In the 2016 census, Yagoonya had a population of 25 people.

In the 2021 census, Yagoonya had a population of 20 people.

== Education ==
There are no schools in Yagoonya. The nearest government schools are in neighbouring Kowanyama (P-10) to the north or in Normanton (P-10) and Karumba (P-6), both to the south-west. There is no secondary Years 11 and 12 schooling available in the area or nearby; options are distance education and boarding school.
