= Highbury, Queensland =

Highbury
- Suburb
- Interactive map of Highbury
- Coordinates: 16.3225°S 142.8875°E
- Country: Australia
- State: Queensland
- LGA: Shire of Mareeba
- Location: 240 km (150 mi) NW of Chillagoe; 381 km (237 mi) NW of Mareeba; 444 km (276 mi) NW of Cairns; 752 km (467 mi) NW of Townsville; 2,063 km (1,282 mi) NNW of Brisbane

Government
  - State electorate: Cook
  - Federal divisions: Kennedy; Leichhardt

Area
  - Total: 2,168.5 km^{2} (837.3 sq mi)

Population
  - Total: 9 (2021 census)
  - Density: 0.00415/km^{2} (0.0107/sq mi)
- Time zone: UTC+10:00 (AEST)
- Postcode: 4871
Suburbs around Highbury
Maramie	Palmer	Palmer
Maramie	Highbury	Gamboola
Maramie	Staaten	Staaten

Highbury is a rural locality in the Shire of Mareeba, Queensland, Australia. In the 2021 census, Highbury had a population of 9 people.

== Geography ==
It is located north of the Staaten River National Park. The Mitchell River forms a small part of the eastern boundary before flowing through to the west.

The Burke Developmental Road (State Route 27) runs through from east to west.

The land use is grazing on native vegetation.

== Demographics ==
In the 2016 census, Highbury had "no people or a very low population".

In the 2021 census, Highbury had a population of 9 people.

== Education ==
There are no schools in Highbury, nor nearby. The alternatives are distance education and boarding school.
