= Staaten, Queensland =

Staaten
- Suburb
- Interactive map of Staaten
- Coordinates: 16.5922°S 142.9147°E
- Country: Australia
- State: Queensland
- LGA: Shire of Mareeba

Government
  - State electorate: Cook
  - Federal division: Kennedy

Area
  - Total: 3,671.4 km^{2} (1,417.5 sq mi)

Population
  - Total: 0 (2021 census)
  - Density: 0.00000/km^{2} (0.0000/sq mi)
- Time zone: UTC+10:00 (AEST)
- Postcode: 4871
Suburbs around Staaten
Maramie	Highbury	Gamboola
Maramie	Staaten	Lyndside
Yagoonya	Strathmore	Lyndside

Staaten is a rural locality in the Shire of Mareeba, Queensland, Australia. In the 2021 census, Staaten had "no people or a very low population".

== Geography ==
The Staaten River enters the locality from the south (Strathmore) and flows to the west (Maramie). The locality is within the Staaten River National Park in the Gulf Plains bioregion. There is no public road access to the locality.

== Demographics ==
In the 2016 census, Staaten had "no people or a very low population".

In the 2021 census, Staaten had "no people or a very low population".

== Education ==
There are no schools in Staaten, nor nearby.
