= Burke Developmental Road =

Road in Queensland, Australia

Burke Developmental Road Queensland
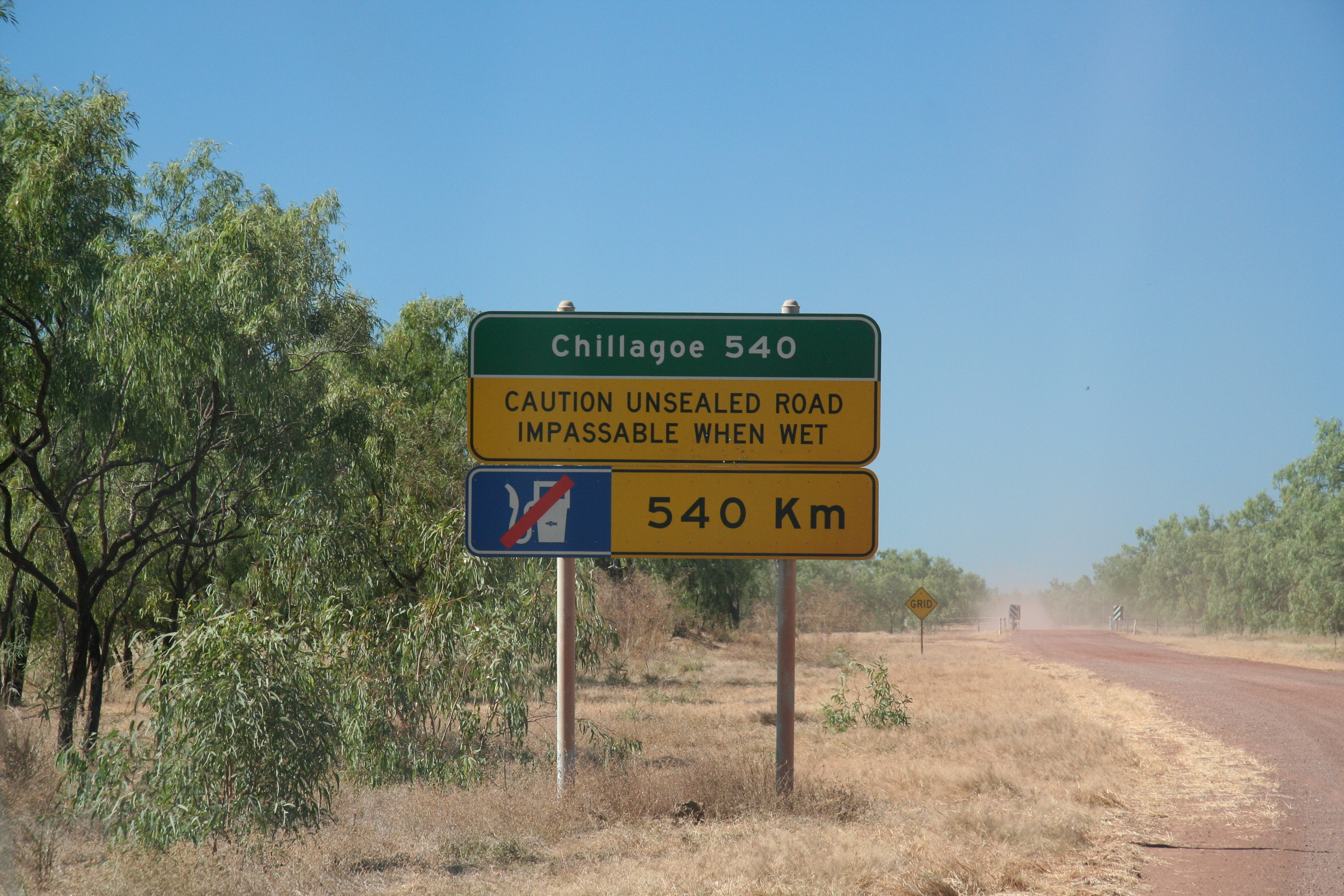
- Start of unsealed portion of northeast-bound Burke Developmental Road east of Karumba
- Burke Developmental Road (green on black).

General information
- Type: Road
- Length: 1,035 km (643 mi)
- Route number(s): National Route 83; State Route 27

Major junctions
- South end: Barkly Highway / Flinders Highway, east of Cloncurry
- East end: Mareeba Dimbulah Road, Dimbulah

Location(s)
- Major suburbs: Normanton, Mungana, Chillagoe

The Burke Developmental Road is a Queensland (Australia) developmental road. It links Cloncurry and Normanton in a south–north direction, then turns to the north-east 30 km (19 mi) north of Normanton for 230 km (140 mi) before turning south-east till Dimbulah, where it becomes the Mareeba Dimbulah Road.

The road crosses the Gilbert River. This bridge was named after two of the region's indigenous leaders, Lily and Jubilee Slattery. A major unsealed section begins about 45 km (28 mi) north of Normanton and continues until Chillagoe. As of 2014, some sections totaling about 15 km (9.3 mi) are unsealed between Chillagoe and Dimbulah. It may become impassable during the wet season. In mid-2007, A$28 million worth of funding was allocated for the widening of the road.

== Northern Australia Beef Roads upgrades ==
The Northern Australia Beef Roads Program announced in 2016 included two projects for the Burke Developmental Road.

=== Pavement strengthening ===
The project for progressive sealing works between Chillago and Almaden (Package One) was completed in early 2020 at a total cost of $4.7 million.

The project for progressive sealing works between Chillago and Almaden (Package Two) was completed in early 2020 at a total cost of $2.7 million.

== Other upgrades ==
=== Replace bridge ===
A project to replace the Butcher Creek bridge, at a cost of $10.7 million, was completed in December 2021.

=== Progressive sealing ===
A project to progressively seal sections of the road between Normanton and Dimbulah, at a cost of $14 million, was expected to complete in June 2022.

Another project to progressively seal sections of the road between Almaden and Chillagoe, at a cost of $14.8 million, was to be completed by late 2022.

== Major Intersections ==
LGA	Location	km	mi	Destinations	Notes
Cloncurry	Cloncurry	0	0.0	Barkly Highway (National Route A2) west – Mount Isa / east – Cloncurry, Hughenden, Winton	Southern end of Burke Developmental Road. National Route 83 continues west concurrent with Barkly Highway.
Cloncurry	Four Ways	180	110	Wills Developmental Road – south–east – Julia Creek	Southern concurrency terminus with Wills Developmental Road
Cloncurry	Four Ways	181	112	Wills Developmental Road – north–west – Gregory	Northern concurrency terminus with Wills Developmental Road
Flinders River		318	198	Bridge	
Carpentaria	Normanton	373	232	Gulf Developmental Road (National Route 1) south–east – Croydon	Southern concurrency terminus with National Route 1
Carpentaria	Normanton	375	233	Savannah Way (National Route 1) – south–west – Carpentaria, Burketown	Northern concurrency terminus with National Route 1
Norman River		381	237	EB Whyte Bridge – National Route 83 terminates here. Burke Developmental Road continues as State Route 27.	
Carpentaria	Howitt	410	250	Karumba Road – west – Karumba	See map of Howitt
Gilbert River		483	300	Lily and Jubilee Slattery Bridge	
Middle Creek		546	339	Bridge	
Staaten River		569	354	Bridge	
Carpentaria	Maramie	640	400	Dunbar Kowanyama Road – north–west – Kowanyama	See map of Maramie
Lynd River		764	475	Bridge	
Walsh River		820	510	Bridge	
Walsh River		908	564	Bridge	
Mareeba	Petford	1,003	623	Herberton–Petford Road – south–east – Herberton	See map of Petford
Emu Creek		1,005	624	Bridge	
Mareeba	Dimbulah	1,035	643	Mareeba Dimbulah Road – east – Mareeba	Northern end of Burke Developmental Road (Dimbulah town centre). State Route 27 continues east to Mareeba as Mareeba Dimbulah Road.
1.000 mi = 1.609 km; 1.000 km = 0.621 mi: Concurrency terminus; Route transition

== Gallery ==
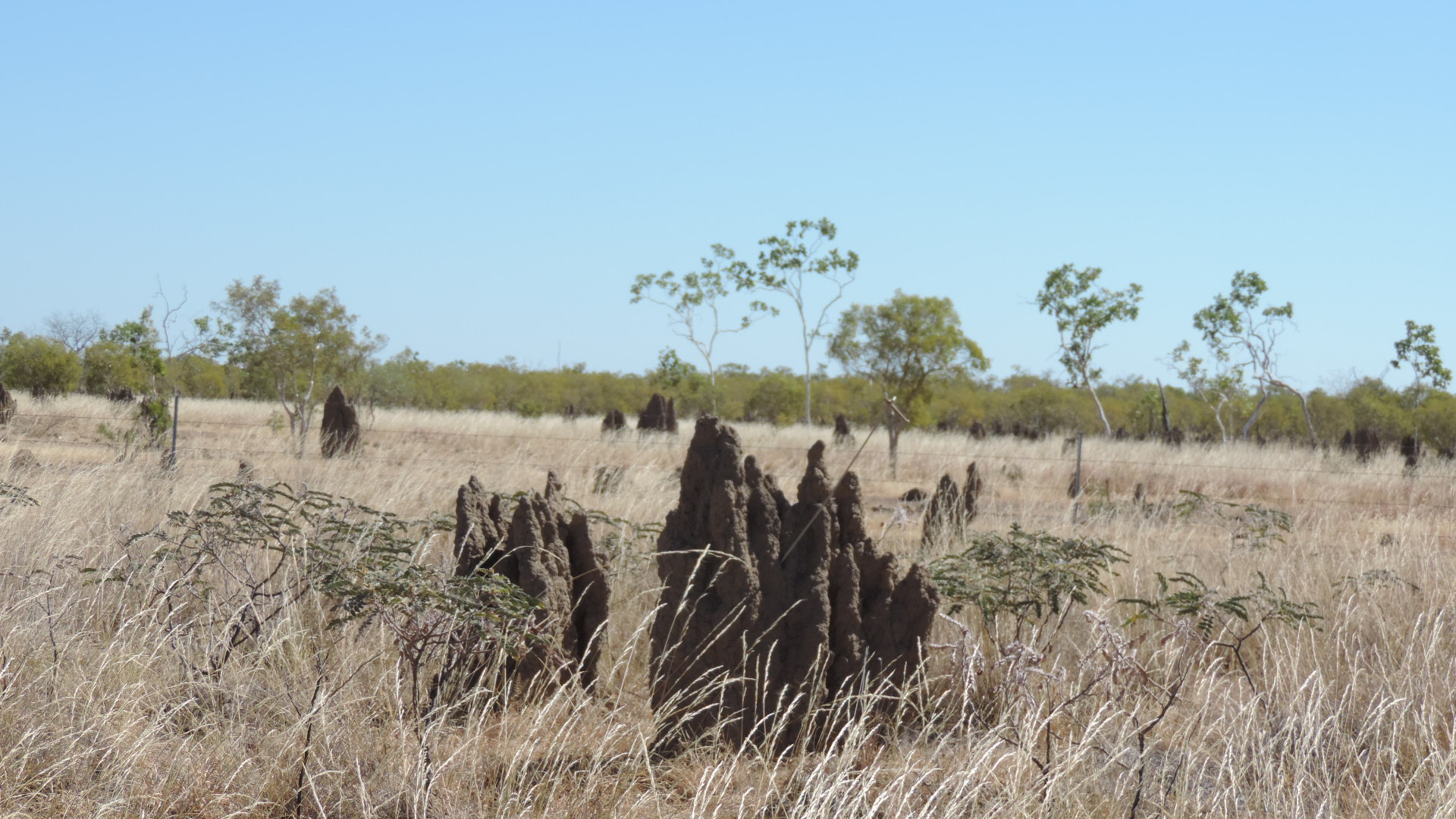
Termite mounds along the Burke Developmental Road, Stokes, 2019

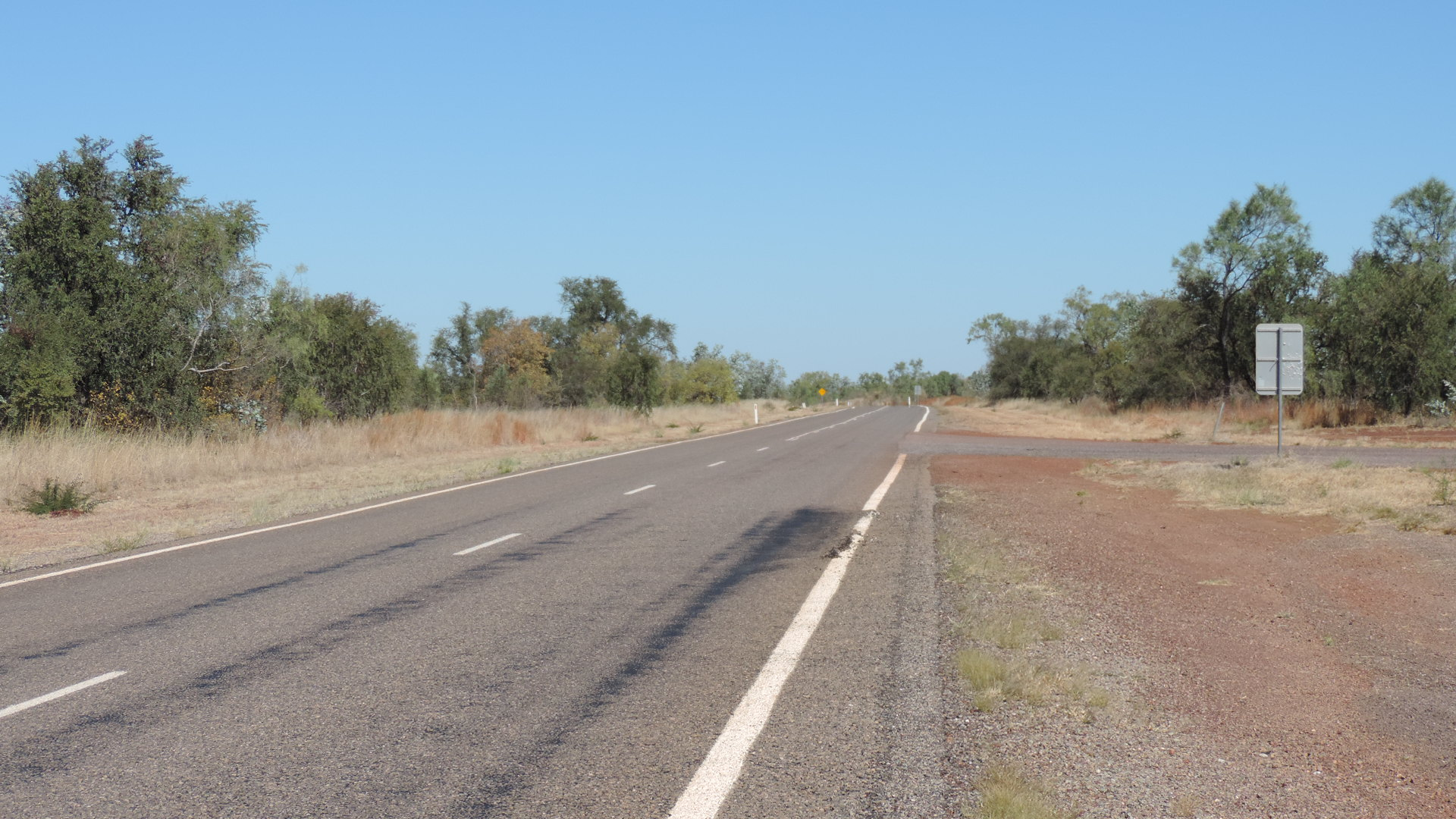
Burke Developmental Road south of Normanton, 2019

== See also ==
- Highways in Australia
- List of highways in Queensland
