= Limmen Bight =

Bight in Northern Territory, Australia

Coordinates: 14°48′47″S 135°20′21″E

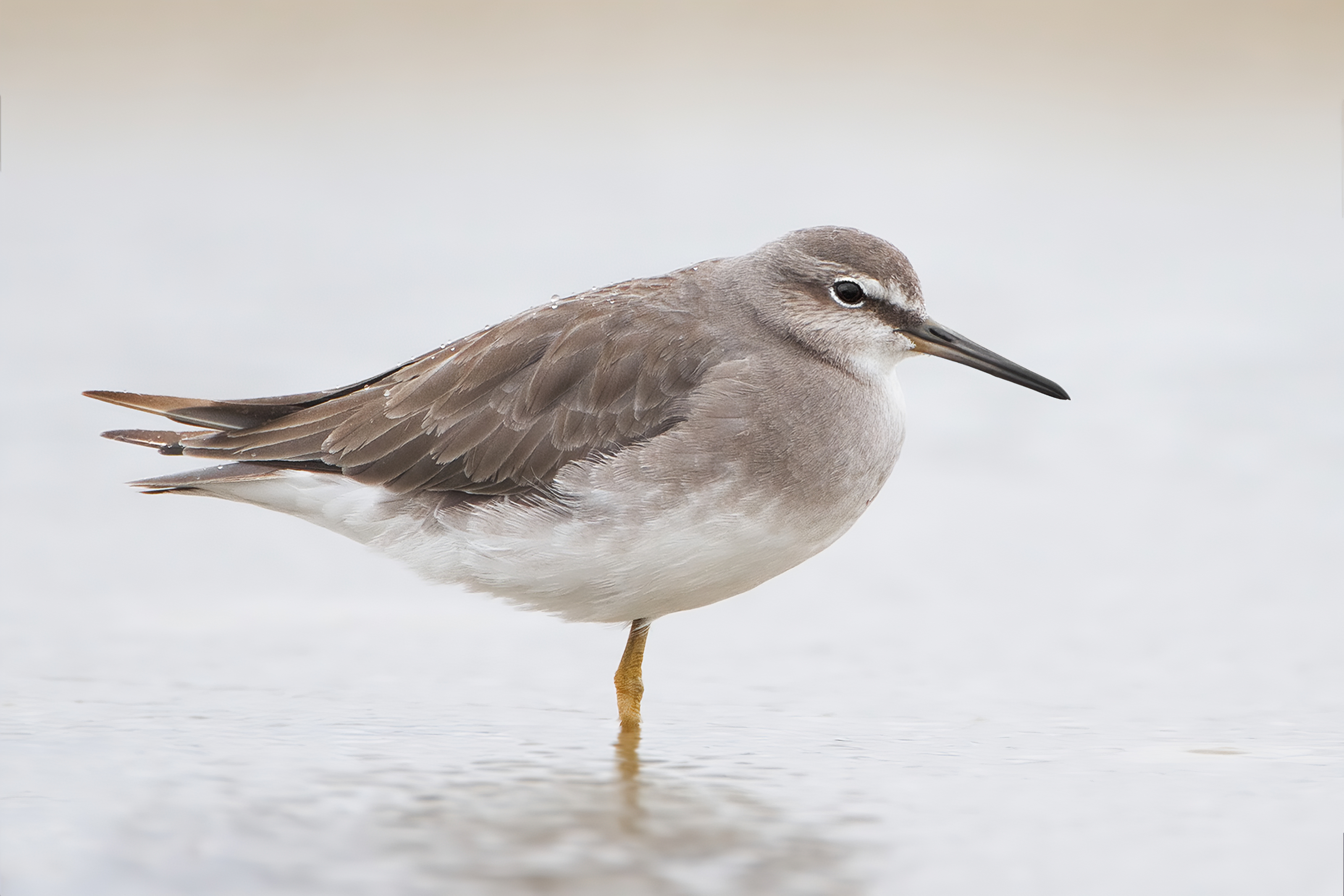
The coastal mudflats of the bight are an important site for grey-tailed tattlers.

Limmen Bight is a bight, or large, open bay, located in the Northern Territory of Australia at the western end of the Gulf of Carpentaria about 360 kilometres (220 mi) east of the town of Katherine. It is part of the traditional lands and waters of the Marra people. It was named in April 1644 by Abel Tasman for one of his ships on his voyage of exploration along the northern Australian coast. It contains the second largest area of tidal flats in the Northern Territory.

== Description ==
Limmen Bight contains several small offshore islands, the largest of which is Maria Island; others are Edward, Sandy and Beatrice Islands, and Low Rock. It is bounded on the south-west by the Gulf Plains of the Northern Territory, on the north-west by the south-eastern coast of Arnhem Land, and in the north by Groote Eylandt. The mouth of the Roper River marks the westernmost point of the bight; other rivers flowing into the bight include the Rose, Towns and Limmen Bight Rivers. Land around the bight is predominantly Aboriginal freehold land held by the Arnhem Land and Marra Aboriginal Land Trusts, with some parts lying within the Nathan River and other pastoral leases. Port Roper, at the mouth of the Roper River, is a site for semi-permanent fishing camps.

== Fauna ==
The beaches of the Bight's islands are important for nesting terns and for marine turtles, for which the site is considered to be of national significance. The extensive coastal mudflats provide feeding habitat for flocks of over 30,000 migratory waders, or shorebirds, and the freshwater swamps of the river floodplains are used by tens of thousands of waterbirds. The coastal waters support high densities of dugongs. Threatened vertebrate species found in the area include the Australian bustard, masked owl, partridge pigeon and northern hopping mouse, as well as the flatback, green, hawksbill and olive ridley turtles.

=== Important Bird Area ===
A 2234 km^{2} tract of land along the coast of the Limmen Bight has been identified by BirdLife International as an Important Bird Area (IBA) because it supports over 1% of the world populations of grey-tailed tattlers, great knots and white-headed stilts. The IBA includes the coastline from the Roper River to the Limmen Bight River, with the inland swamps south of and along the lower Roper River. The main habitats are intertidal mudflats, low samphire shrubland, scattered patches of dry rainforest, and channel-fringing mangroves.

Chestnut rails inhabit the mangroves of the IBA. Black-tailed godwits have been recorded in substantial numbers. A waterbird breeding colony near the Roper River mouth held about 2500 birds, including pied herons, egrets and cormorants. Seabird breeding aggregations at the site include the largest pied cormorant and little tern colonies in the Northern Territory. There are also colonies of up to 10,000 crested terns and 5000 roseate terns. Sandy Island and Low Rock form a separate IBA important for nesting terns.
