= Howitt, Queensland =

Howitt
- Suburb
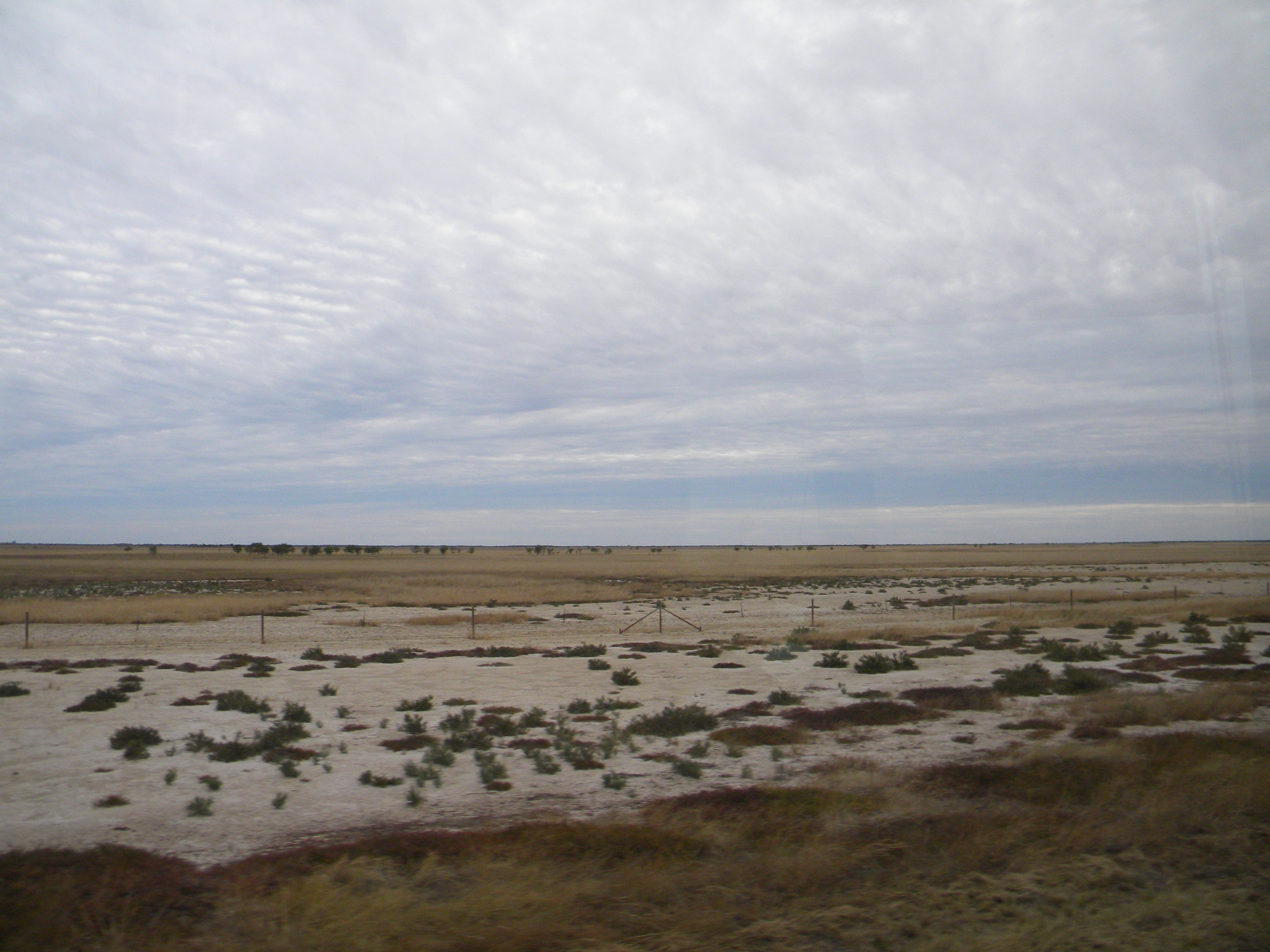
- View from the Burke Development Road, Howitt, 2013

- Interactive map of Howitt
- Coordinates: 17.2522°S 141.5686°E
- Country: Australia
- State: Queensland
- LGA: Shire of Carpentaria
- Location: 30.5 km (19.0 mi) NNE of Normanton; 39.6 km (24.6 mi) E of Karumba; 529 km (329 mi) NE of Mount Isa; 875 km (544 mi) WNW of Townsville; 2,097 km (1,303 mi) NW of Brisbane

Government
  - State electorate: Traeger
  - Federal division: Kennedy

Area
  - Total: 8,626.6 km^{2} (3,330.7 sq mi)

Population
  - Total: 48 (2021 census)
  - Density: 0.00556/km^{2} (0.01441/sq mi)
- Time zone: UTC+10:00 (AEST)
- Postcode: 4890
Suburbs around Howitt
Gulf of Carpentaria	Gulf of Carpentaria	Yagoonya
Karumba	Howitt	Strathmore
Normanton	Karron	Croydon

Howitt is a coastal locality in the Shire of Carpentaria, Queensland, Australia. In the 2021 census, Howitt had a population of 48 people.

== Geography ==
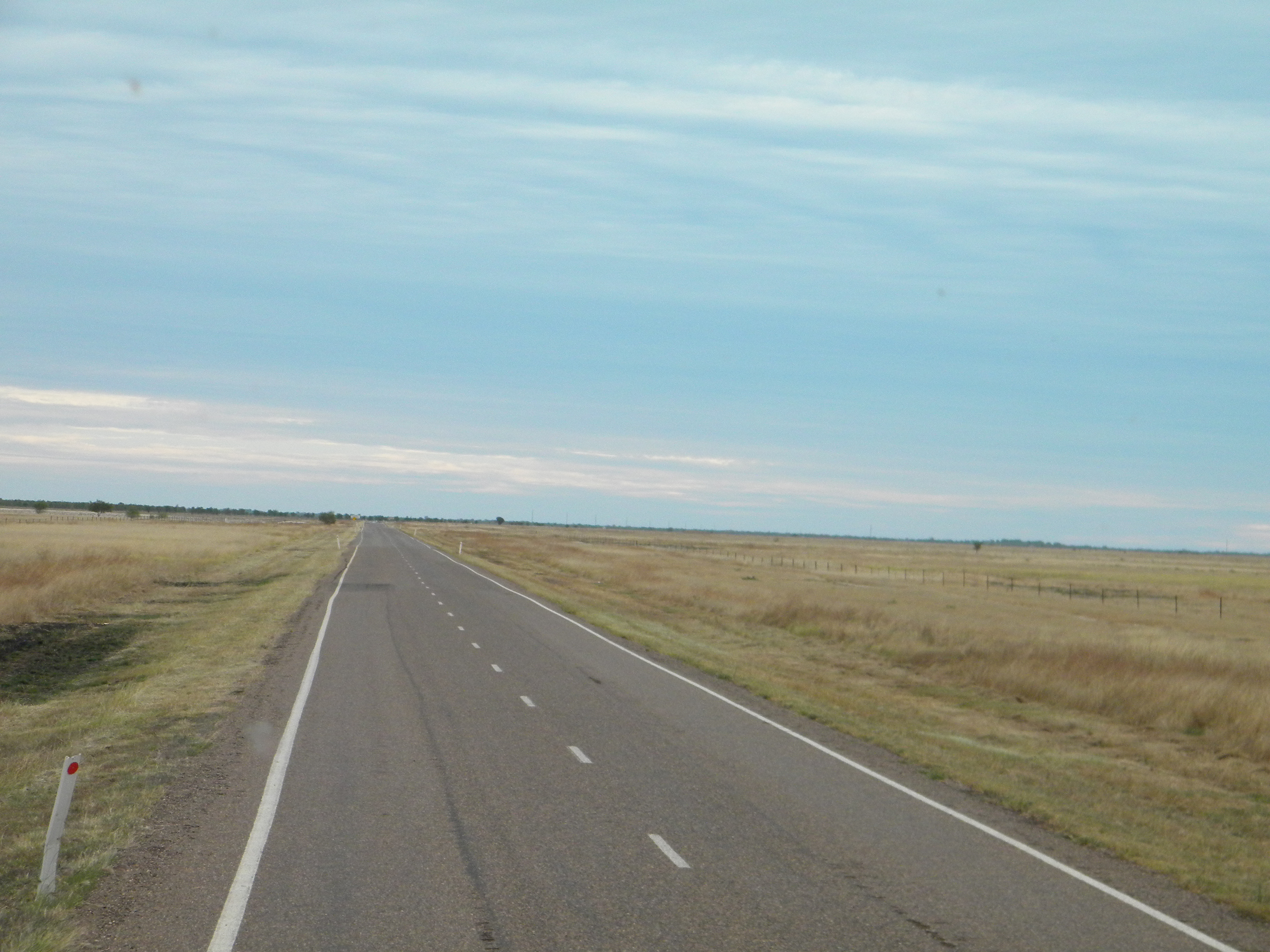
Karumba Developmental Road, 2013

Howitt is on the western coast of Cape York Peninsula facing the Gulf of Carpentaria.

The Burke Developmental Road passes through the locality from north-east (Yagoonya) to the south-west (Normanton). The Karumba Developmental Road enters the locality from the west (Karumba), terminating at its junction with the Burke Developmental Road in Howitt.

The land use is grazing on native vegetation.

== History ==
Many towns and localities in this area have names connected to the Burke and Wills expedition. Although not officially recorded, it is likely that Howitt is named after Alfred William Howitt, who led a relief mission that rescued the only survivor John King and buried the bodies of Burke and Wills (Howitt later disinterred the bodies and returned them to Melbourne for burial).

== Demographics ==
In the 2016 census, Howitt had a population of 24 people.

In the 2021 census, Howitt had a population of 48 people.

== Education ==
There are no schools in Howitt. The nearest government primary schools are Karumba State School in neighbouring Karumba to the west and Normanton State School in neighbouring Normanton to the south-west. The nearest government secondary school is Normanton State School (to Year 10). Some parts of Howitt are too distant from these schools and the alternatives are distance education and boarding school. There are no schools offering secondary Years 11 and 12 in the area; again the alternatives are distance education and boarding school.
