= Maramie, Queensland =

Maramie
- Suburb
- Interactive map of Maramie
- Coordinates: 16.0708°S 142.2758°E
- Country: Australia
- State: Queensland
- LGA: Shire of Carpentaria
- Location: 101 km (63 mi) SE of Kowanyama; 260 km (160 mi) NE of Normanton; 504 km (313 mi) WNW of Cairns; 2,127 km (1,322 mi) NW of Brisbane

Government
  - State electorates: Cook; Traeger
  - Federal divisions: Leichhardt; Kennedy

Area
  - Total: 13,348.0 km^{2} (5,153.7 sq mi)

Population
  - Total: 28 (2021 census)
  - Density: 0.00210/km^{2} (0.00543/sq mi)
- Time zone: UTC+10:00 (AEST)
- Postcode: 4871
Suburbs around Maramie
Kowanyama	Edward River	Yarraden; Dixie
Yagoonya	Maramie	Palmer; Highbury
Yagoonya	Yagoonya	Staaten; Strathmore

Maramie is an outback locality in the Shire of Carpentaria, Queensland, Australia. In the 2021 census, Maramie had a population of 28 people.

== Geography ==
The Mitchell River flows through from east to north-west. The Alice River rises in the locality and flows north-west to its junction with the Mitchell on the north-western boundary.

The Burke Developmental Road (State Route 27) enters the locality from the south (Yagoonya) and exits to the east (Highbury).

There are three national parks within the locality:

- Errk Oykangand National Park in the north-west of the locality
- a small portion of Olkola National Park in the north-east of the locality (extending into neighbouring Dixie)
- Staaten River National Park in the south-east of the locality (extending into neighbouring Staaten)

Apart from these protected areas, the predominant land use is grazing on native vegetation.

== History ==
The locality takes its name from Maramie Creek (now called Clark Creek) which was in turn named by pastoralists Francis Lascelles Jardine and Alexander William Jardine after the fresh water crayfish (known to them as maramie) which they caught in the creek.

== Demographics ==
In the 2016 census, Maramie had a population of 13 people.

In the 2021 census, Maramie had a population of 28 people.

== Economy ==
There are a number of homesteads in the locality:

- Dorunda Outstation (16.5531°S 141.8248°E)
- Dunbar (16.0449°S 142.3785°E)
- Koolatah (15.8922°S 142.4443°E)
- Oriners (15.4088°S 142.9432°E)

== Education ==
There are no schools in Maramie. The nearest government primary school is Kowanyama State School in neighbouring Kowanyama to the north-west, but it would be too distant from many parts of Maramie for a daily commute. There are no secondary schools nearby. The alternatives are distance education and boarding school.
