= Strathmore, Queensland =

Strathmore
- Suburb
- Interactive map of Strathmore
- Coordinates: 17.1955°S 142.7347°E
- Country: Australia
- State: Queensland
- LGAs: Shire of Mareeba; Shire of Etheridge
- Location: 550 km (340 mi) NNW of Georgetown; 745 km (463 mi) W of Mareeba; 807 km (501 mi) W of Cairns; 1,093 km (679 mi) NW of Townsville; 2,320 km (1,440 mi) NW of Brisbane

Government
  - State electorates: Cook; Traeger
  - Federal division: Kennedy

Area
  - Total: 9,434.7 km^{2} (3,642.8 sq mi)

Population
  - Total: 0 (2021 census)
  - Density: 0.00000/km^{2} (0.00000/sq mi)
- Time zone: UTC+10:00 (AEST)
- Postcode: 4871
Suburbs around Strathmore
Maramie	Staaten	Lyndside
Yagoonya; Howitt	Strathmore	Ravensworth; Red River
Croydon	Gilbert River	Abingdon Downs; Georgetown

Strathmore is an outback locality split between the Shire of Mareeba and the Shire of Etheridge, in Queensland, Australia. In the 2021 census, Strathmore had "no people or a very low population".

== Geography ==
The Einasleigh River splits the locality between the two local government areas with Shire of Mareeba to the north and Shire of Etheridge to the south.

There are no formalised roads within the locality, but there are tracks across the pastoral properties.

The land use is grazing on native vegetation.

== Demographics ==
In the 2016 census, Strathmore had "no people or a very low population".

In the 2021 census, Strathmore had "no people or a very low population".

== Economy ==
There are a number of homesteads in the locality:

- Minnies Outstation, part of Strathmore (17.6154°S 142.7373°E)
- Strathmore (17.8620°S 142.5607°E)

== Transport ==
There are a number of airstrips in the locality:

- Minnies Outstation airstrip (17.6134°S 142.7341°E)
- Strathmore Airstrip #1 (17.8427°S 142.5397°E)
- Strathmore Airstrip #2 (17.8642°S 142.5574°E)

== Education ==
There are no schools in Strathmore, nor nearby. The alternatives are distance education and boarding school.
