= Sandy Island and Low Rock Important Bird Area =

Two small islands in the Northern Territory of Australia

Coordinates: 14°25′41″S 135°52′29″E

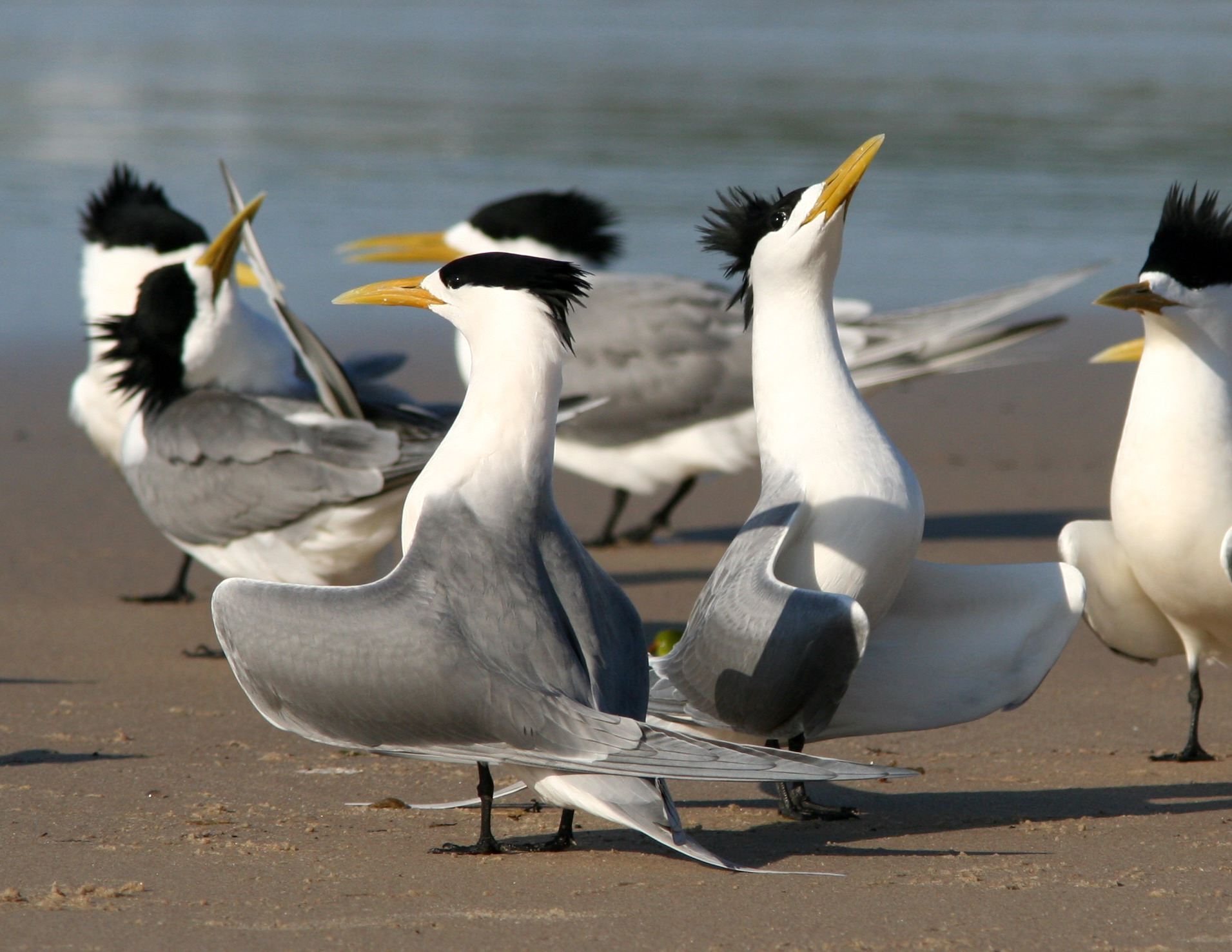
The IBA is an important site for greater crested terns

The Sandy Island and Low Rock Important Bird Area comprises two small islands with a collective area of 9 ha lying at the western end of the Gulf of Carpentaria in the Northern Territory of Australia. They lie south-west of Groote Eylandt off the coast of Arnhem Land, with the nearest settlement there the Numbulwar community. They are important as breeding sites for terns.

== Description ==
Sandy Island consists of three islets, connected by strips of sand and exposed reef at low tide, about 20 km from the mainland. The central island, vegetated with grass, vines and shrubs, supports the main colony. Low Rock is a sand, coral rubble and rock island 25 km away, and about 30 km from the mainland; it is surrounded by a reef and has a central stand of mangroves. Both islands are traditionally owned Aboriginal land. Sea turtles nest on the islands' beaches.

== Birds ==
The islands have been identified by BirdLife International as an Important Bird Area (IBA) because they support over 1% of the world population of roseate terns, as well as a large breeding colony of greater crested terns, with up to about 10,000 birds of each species recorded. The greater crested terns nest mainly on Sandy Island, with small numbers of silver gulls. As well as roseate terns, birds recorded as nesting on Low Rock include pied cormorants (150), and bridled (1000), black-naped (800) and lesser crested (440) terns.
