= Strangways River =

River in Northern Territory, Australia

Coordinates: 14°52′S 133°50′E

Strangways River is a tributary of the Roper River east of Elsey, Northern Territory, Australia.

The river was named in 1862 by the Scottish explorer John McDouall Stuart. Stuart wrote in his journal: "Saturday, June 14 - River Strangways, named after the Hon. H B Templar Strangways, Commissioner of Crown Lands, South Australia, and who, since his taking office, has done all in his power to promote exploration of the interior."

The Strangways crater was named after the river. The crater is west of the river, 75 km southeast of Elsey Station.
