= Carpentaria, Queensland =

Carpentaria
- Suburb
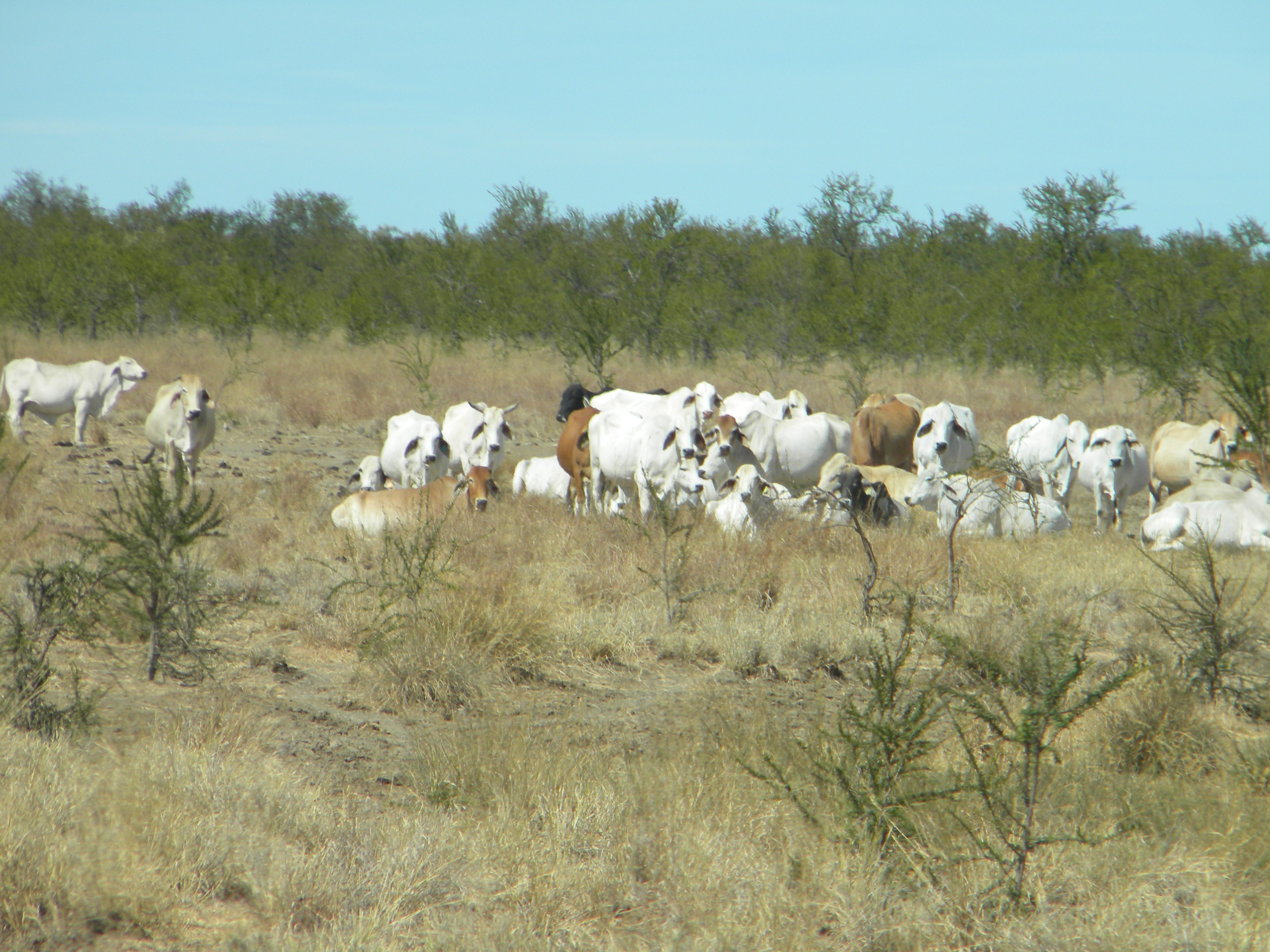
- Cattle beside the Savannah Way (Burketon to Normanton Road), 2013

- Interactive map of Carpentaria
- Coordinates: 17.9830°S 140.16°E
- Country: Australia
- State: Queensland
- LGA: Shire of Carpentaria
- Location: 97.2 km (60.4 mi) WSW of Normanton; 128 km (80 mi) SE of Burketown; 474 km (295 mi) NNW of Mount Isa; 766 km (476 mi) W of Cairns; 2,042 km (1,269 mi) NW of Brisbane

Government
  - State electorate: Traeger
  - Federal division: Kennedy

Area
  - Total: 4,730.6 km^{2} (1,826.5 sq mi)

Population
  - Total: 25 (2021 census)
  - Density: 0.00528/km^{2} (0.01369/sq mi)
- Time zone: UTC+10:00 (AEST)
- Postcode: 4823
Suburbs around Carpentaria
| Gulf of Carpentaria | Gulf of Carpentaria | Gulf of Carpentaria |
| Burketown | Carpentaria | Normanton |
| Gregory | Stokes | Stokes |

Carpentaria is a coastal locality in the Shire of Carpentaria, Queensland, Australia. In the 2021 census, Carpentaria had a population of 25 people.

== Geography ==
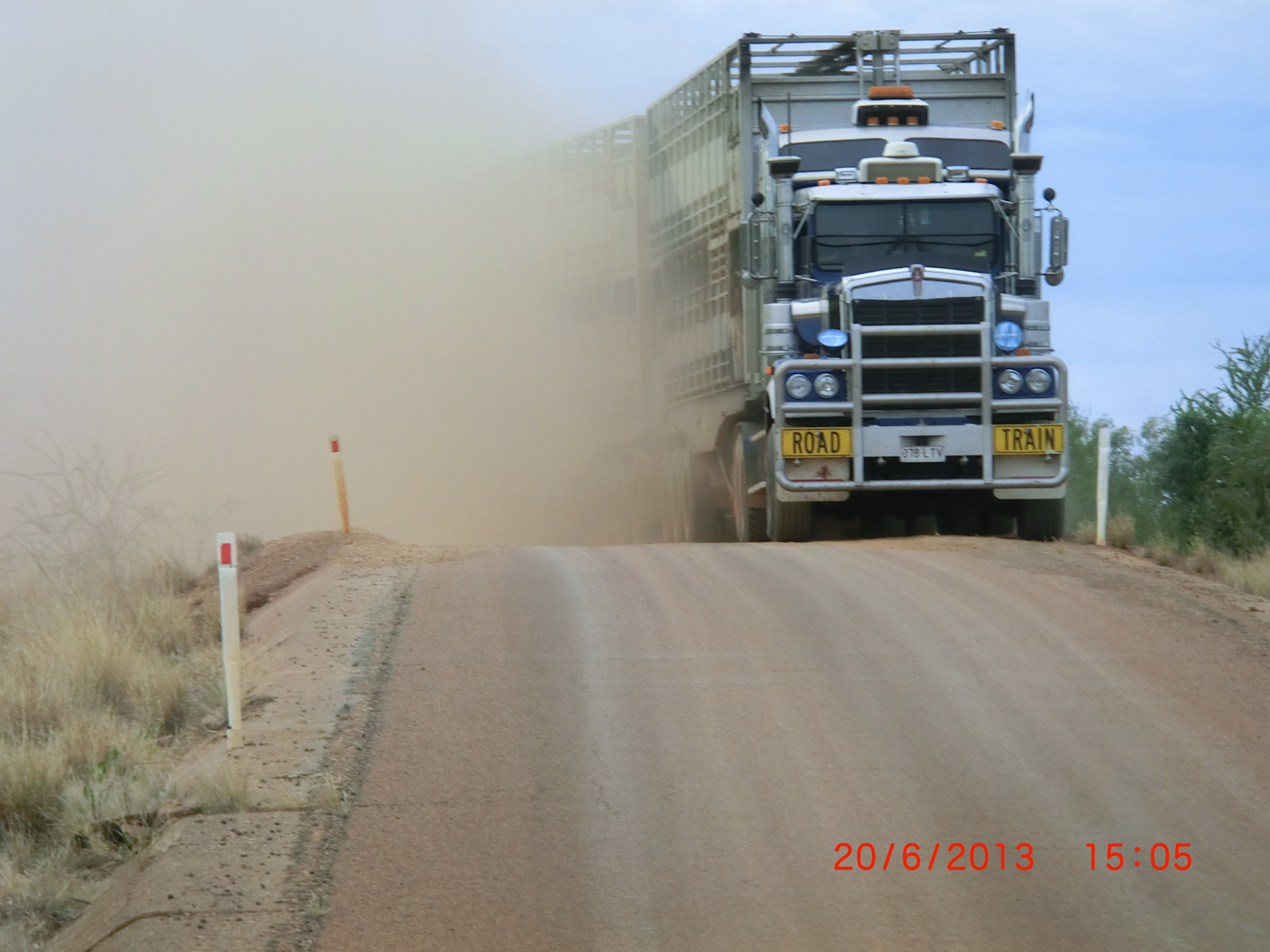
Road train on the Burketown Normanton Road, 2013

The locality is on the southern coast of the Gulf of Carpentaria. It is part of the Gulf Country. The Leichhardt River forms the western boundary of the locality (17.5992°S 139.7900°E).

The coastal strip is mangrove swamps, while the land use in the remainder of the locality is grazing on native vegetation.

Carpentaria has the following coastal features, from west to east:

- Leichhardt River mouth (17.5992°S 139.7900°E)
- Gore Point (17.6388°S 139.9408°E)
- Disaster Inlet (17.6449°S 139.9376°E)
- Middle Point (17.7024°S 140.2079°E)
- Morning Inlet (17.7122°S 140.2152°E)

The north-western corner of the locality (alongside the Leichhardt River) is within the Finucane Island National Park. It is an estuarine wetland which is important for its fish and waterbirds habitats. Its seagrasses are used for grazing by dugongs. It is only accessible by boat and visitors should beware of crocodiles.

The Burketown Normanton Road passes through the locality from the south-east (Normanton) to the south-west (Stokes).

== History ==
The name derives from the Gulf of Carpentaria, a name used on Dutch charts since 1700.

Gore Point was named in July 1841 by Lieutenant John Lort Stokes of HMS Beagle. It was named after Lieutenant Graham Gore who also served on the Beagle. Disaster Inlet was also named by Stokes after Gore's accident with an exploding firearm which wounded Gore in the hand.

In 2015, significant die-back of mangroves occurred due to extremely dry weather conditions lowering the level of the sea water. Climate change is suggested to be the cause.

== Demographics ==
In the 2016 census, Carpentaria had a population of 14 people.

In the 2021 census, Carpentaria had a population of 25 people.

== Education ==
There are no schools in Carpentaria. The nearest government primary schools are in Normanton State School in neighbouring Normanton to the east and Burketown State School in neighbouring Burketown to the west. The nearest government secondary school is Normanton State School to Year 10. However, parts of the locality are too distant from these schools for a daily commute. Also, there are no nearby schools offering secondary schooling to Year 12. Distance education and boarding schools are the alternatives.
