= Shire of Carpentaria =

Coordinates: 17°40′16.33″S 141°04′34″E

- Local government area
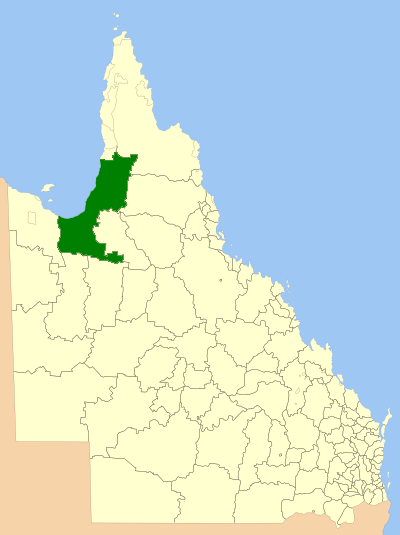
- Location within Queensland

- Interactive map of Shire of Carpentaria
- Country: Australia
- State: Queensland
- Region: Far North Queensland
- Established: 1883
- Council seat: Normanton

Government
  - Mayor: Jack Bawden
  - State electorate: Traeger, Cook
  - Federal division: Kennedy

Area
  - Total: 64,121 km^{2} (24,757 sq mi)

Population
  - Total: 2,090 (2021 census)
  - Density: 0.03259/km^{2} (0.08442/sq mi)
- Website: Shire of Carpentaria
LGAs around Shire of Carpentaria
Gulf of Carpentaria	Kowanyama	Cook
Gulf of Carpentaria	Shire of Carpentaria	Mareeba
Burke	Cloncurry, McKinlay	Croydon

The Shire of Carpentaria is a local government area in Far North Queensland, Australia on the Gulf of Carpentaria, for which it is named.

In the 2021 census, the Shire of Carpentaria had a population of 2,090 people.

== Geography ==
The Shire of Carpentaria covers an area of 64,121 square kilometres (24,757.3 sq mi), and has existed as a local government entity since 1883. Its two main population centres are the towns of Karumba, a fishing port, and Normanton, the administrative centre, both of which are located on the Norman River.

== History ==
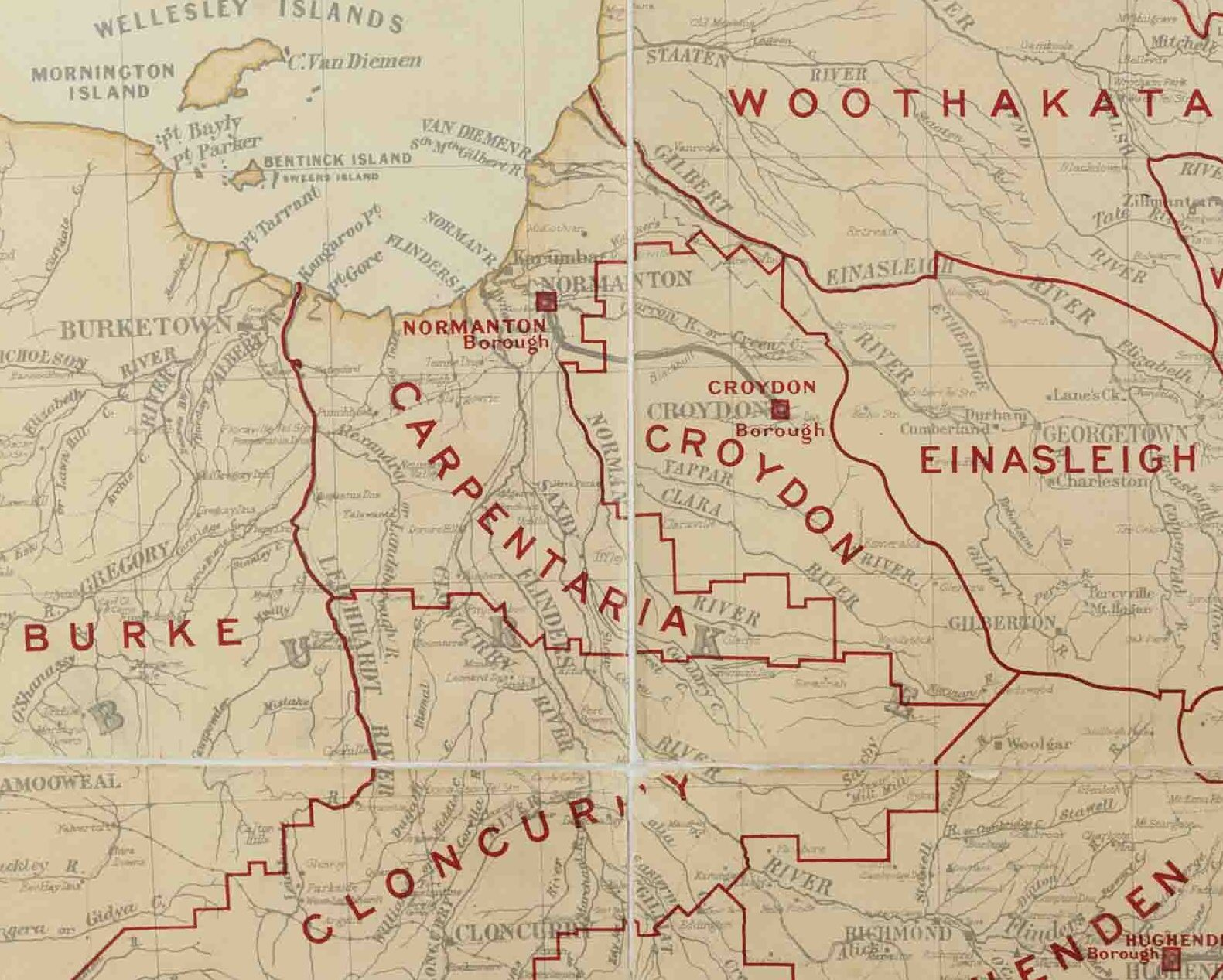
Map of Carpentaria Division and adjacent local government areas, March 1902

The Doonmunya Division was created on 11 November 1879 as one of 74 divisions around Queensland under the Divisional Boards Act 1879 with a population of 396. However, the divisional board appeared to be completely inactive, perhaps because the division was so large (being the area surrounding the southern part of the Gulf of Carpentaria) and was very sparsely settled. Nonetheless some of the citizens were unhappy about this. Consequently, on 11 January 1883, the Doonmunya Division was abolished and a new Carpentaria Division was created to replace it.

Given the size of the Carpentaria Division, the distance to its headquarters in Normanton was an issue for residents in the Cloncurry area, leading to a desire to create their own local division. On 7 February 1884, part of Carpentaria Division was separated to create the new Cloncurry Division.

However, once the Carpentaria Divisional Board became operational, the residents of the Burketown area became concerned that their rates were likely to be spent on the Normanton area rather than their own and began to agitate for their own division west of the Leichhardt River. On 30 January 1885, the Burke Division was created from lands formerly within the Carpentaria Division with some adjustments to the Cloncurry Division.

With the passage of the Local Authorities Act 1902, Carpentaria Division became the Shire of Carpentaria on 31 March 1903.

Prior to 2005, two Aboriginal communities (Kowanyama and Pormpuraaw) administered under Deed of Grant in Trust by community councils since the mid-1980s, were part of the Shire's area, but they were formally excised and given a new status as Aboriginal Shires.

== Towns and localities ==
The Shire of Carpentaria includes the following settlements:

- Normanton (pop 1,100)
- Karumba (pop 518)
- Carpentaria
- Fielding
- Howitt
- Maramie
- Savannah
- Stokes
- Yagoonya

== Chairmen and mayors ==
- 1920: J. R. Butteris
- 1927: J. K. Casey
- March 2004 – 2008: Ashley Gallagher
- March 2009 – March 2016: Fred Pascoe
- March 2016 – present: Lyall Vincent (Jack) Bawden

== Demographics ==
Prior to 1971, Aboriginal people who form a majority of the population were not counted in census statistics.

Until 1 July 2002, the Australian Bureau of Statistics included the Island and DOGIT councils within the Shire of Cook statistical local area. Information for the reduced Shire back to 1996 has been provided on the ABS website through the Time Series Profile.

Year	Population		Notes
1879	396		
1933	696		
1947	610		
1954	566		
1961	834		
1966	1,031		
1971	2,558		
1976	2,809		
1981	3,273		
1986	3,287		
1991	3,807		
1996	2,790	4,271	
2001 census	4,801		
2006 census	1,939		
2011 census	2,053		
2016 census	1,958		
2021 census	2,090		

== Amenities ==
The Carpentaria Shire Council operates libraries in Normanton and Karumba.
