= Kok-Nar language =

Extinct Australian language

Kok-Nar
- Gundara
- Kuuk-Nhang
- Native to: Australia
- Region: Cape York Peninsula, Queensland
- Extinct: (date missing)
- Language family: Pama–Nyungan: Paman; Kok-Nar

Language codes
- ISO 639-3: gko
- Glottolog: kokn1236
- AIATSIS: G29
- ELP: Kok-Nar

Kok Narr (Kok-Nar) is an extinct Paman language of the Cape York Peninsula, Queensland, Australia.

== Country ==
Ancestral Koknar(Kwantari) territory is estimated to cover 2,400 square miles (6,200 km^{2}) and extended from Galbraith Station and the northern bank of the lower Staaten River inland to Old Koolatah, north to Inkerman and the middle of the Nassau River.

== Phonology ==
=== Consonants ===
		Peripheral		Laminal		Apical	
		Labial	Velar	Dental	Palatal	Alveolar	Retroflex
Plosive		p	k	t̪	c	t	
Nasal		m	ŋ	n̪	ɲ	n	
Fricative		β	ɣ				
Rhotic	trill					r	
Rhotic	tap					ɾ	
Approximant		w			j	l	ɻ

- /ɻ/ may also be heard as a lateral [ɭ] in word-initial positions.

=== Vowels ===
	Front		Central	Back
Close	i			u
Mid	e	œ	ə	o
Open			a	

- [ɛ] may be heard as an allophone of /i/ when after sounds /ɾ, r, j/.

== Sources ==
- Tindale, Norman Barnett (1974). "Kwantari (QLD)". Aboriginal Tribes of Australia: Their Terrain, Environmental Controls, Distribution, Limits, and Proper Names. Australian National University Press. ISBN 978-0-708-10741-6. Archived from the original on 2015-03-11.
