= Wilton River =

River in the Northern Territory of Australia

Coordinates: 14°35′S 134°36′E

The Wilton River is a large perennial river, and tributary of the Roper River located in the Katherine region of the Northern Territory, Australia.

It flows into the Roper River at Roper Bar, Northern Territory and the traditional owners of the River are the Ngalakgan people. The first European to see the Wilton River was Ludwig Leichhardt in 1845 as he made his way along the south bank of the Roper River and crossing it at Ropers Bar.

The settlement of Urapunga is on the Wilton River.
