= Karumba, Queensland =

Karumba
- Town
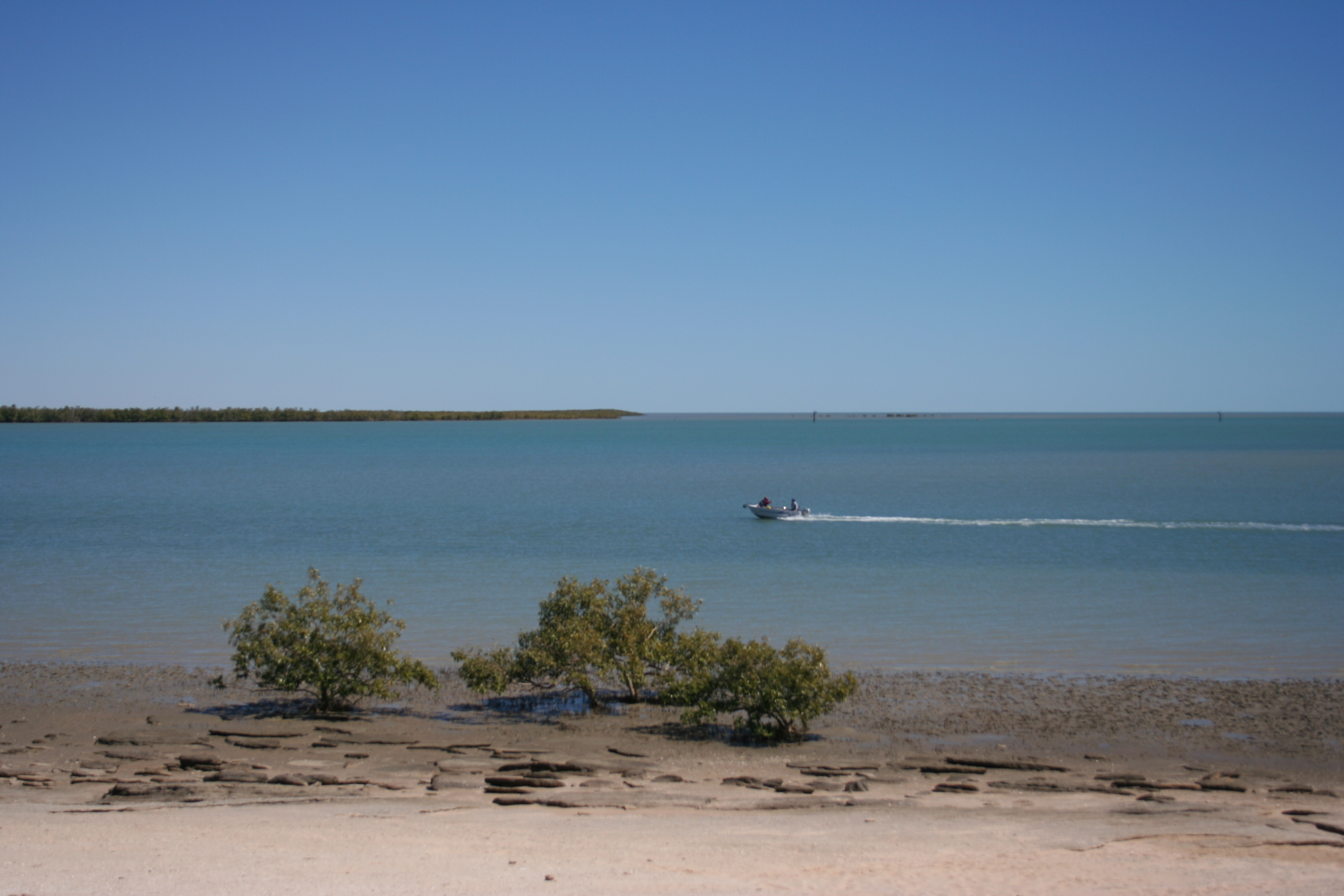
- Karumba Beach, Gulf Savannah

- Interactive map of Karumba
- Coordinates: 17.4838°S 140.8397°E
- Country: Australia
- State: Queensland
- LGA: Shire of Carpentaria
- Location: 70.1 km (43.6 mi) NNW of Normanton; 568 km (353 mi) NNE of Mount Isa; 748 km (465 mi) W of Cairns; 914 km (568 mi) WNW of Townsville; 2,136 km (1,327 mi) NW of Brisbane

Government
  - State electorate: Traeger
  - Federal division: Kennedy

Area
  - Total: 136.8 km^{2} (52.8 sq mi)
- Elevation: 2 m (6.6 ft)

Population
  - Total: 487 (2021 census)
  - Density: 3.560/km^{2} (9.220/sq mi)
- Time zone: UTC+10:00 (AEST)
- Postcode: 4891
- Mean max temp: 30.7 °C (87.3 °F)
- Mean min temp: 20.1 °C (68.2 °F)
- Annual rainfall: 889.8 mm (35.03 in)
Localities around Karumba
Gulf of Carpentaria	Gulf of Carpentaria	Howitt
Gulf of Carpentaria	Karumba	Howitt
Normanton	Normanton	Normanton

Karumba is a town and a coastal locality in the Shire of Carpentaria, Queensland, Australia. In the 2021 census, the locality of Karumba had a population of 487 people.

== Geography ==
Karumba is in the Gulf Country region of Queensland, 71 kilometres (44 mi) by road from Normanton and 2,159 kilometres (1,342 mi) from the state capital, Brisbane. Karumba is within the Shire of Carpentaria, the administrative headquarters of which is in Normanton. The town is sited at the mouth of the Norman River, and enjoys the distinction of being the only town along the southern Gulf of Carpentaria that is within sight of the Gulf itself (the Gulf's extensive tidal flats prohibits settlement elsewhere along its shore).

The rare Morning Glory cloud rolls through Karumba in the early hours of some mornings in September and October.

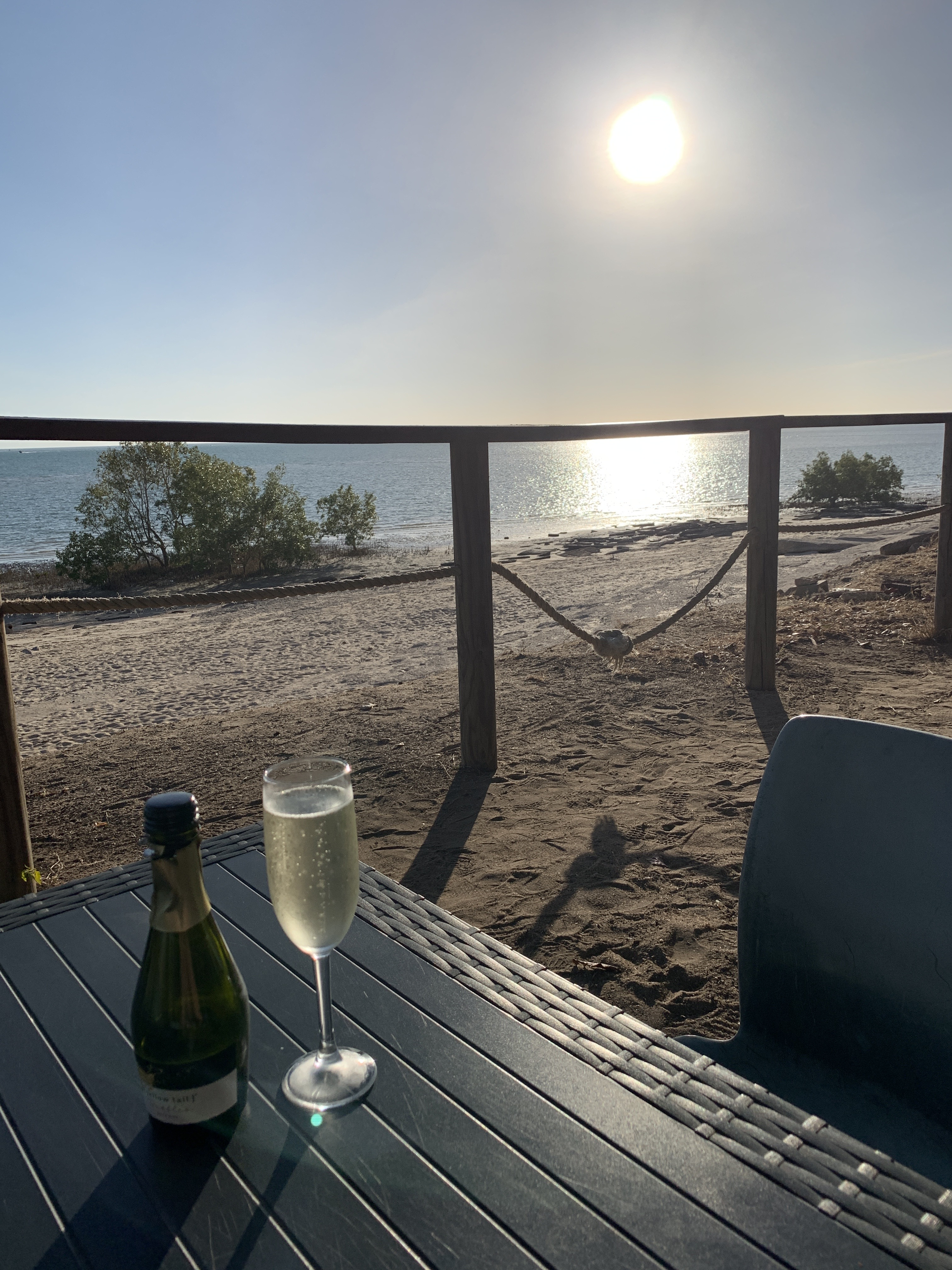
Sunset over the Gulf of Carpentaria at Karumba Beach, 2019

Karumba Point Beach is the only beach in the region that is accessible by bitumen road, and is renowned for its sunset views over the Gulf of Carpentaria.

The port at Karumba is around the mouth of the Norman River where it enters the Gulf of Carpentaria (approx 17.482°S 140.8368°E). Most of the wharves are located in the Norman River at the town of Karumba. The port is used for the export of minerals, seafood, and cattle and for the import of goods needed by local communities, including those on Mornington Island. It is operated by Ports North, headquartered in Cairns.

Karumba Airport is on Fielding Street. There are no regular commercial services from this airport; the nearest regular services are available at Normanton Airport.

== History ==
Before European colonisation and expropriation, the Karumba region had been inhabited for thousands of years by the Gangalidda and Waanyi peoples, who are the traditional custodians of the land. They relied on the rich marine resources and fertile coastal plains for sustenance.

The settlement was originally known as Norman Mouth and Kimberley. The toponym, Kurumba, derives from the Aboriginal name for the area. That name was being used for the township officially by the 1880s.

Karumba Post Office opened on 22 August 1889 and closed in 1919.

Given its access to the Gulf of Carpentaria, the town's economy has revolved largely around fishing. The prawn industry expanded in the 1960s.

In the late 1930s, the town was a refuelling and maintenance stop for the flying boats of Qantas Empire Airways. No. 43 Squadron of the RAAF also operated Consolidated PBY Catalina flying boats from the town between June 1943 and April 1944.

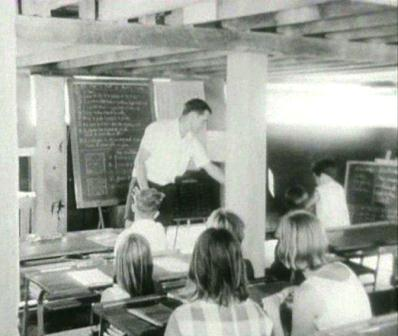
Karumba State School, circa 1970

Karumba State School opened in September 1968.

Regular services by the Uniting Church in Australia are held in the Community Church. They are provided by the McKay Patrol, an aerial service of the Uniting Church that operates out of Cloncurry. Supported by other denominations, the McKay Patrol operates a Cessna 182Q aeroplane to provide spiritual and practical help to people living in remote areas in the north-west of Queensland and the Eastern Tablelands of the Northern Territory, an area of approximately 625,000 square kilometres (241,000 sq mi) with a population of less than 10,000 people.

Karumba Public Library was opened in 1979.

The region is referred to in the song "Every Passing Day" by the Australian band Goanna, on their album Oceania.

The Red Hot Chili Peppers' song "Animal Bar", from their 2006 album Stadium Arcadium is about Karumba, and refers to a local bar.

== Demographics ==
In the 2006 census, the town of Karumba had a population of 518 people.

In the 2016 census, the locality of Karumba had a population of 531 people.

In the 2021 census, the locality of Karumba had a population of 487 people.

== Economy ==
The Karumba port services the Century Zinc Mine as well as the fishing industry.

Les Wilson Barramundi Hatchery is the world's only breeder of the Southern Gulf barramundi.

The prawning industry makes an important economic contribution to the town.

== Education ==
Karumba State School is a government primary (Prep-6) school for boys and girls at 5 Yappar Street (17.4829°S 140.8403°E). In 2018, the school had an enrolment of 28 students with 3 teachers and 7 non-teaching staff (4 full-time equivalent).

There are no secondary schools in Karumba. The nearest government secondary school is Normanton State School (to Year 10) in neighbouring Normanton to the south. There are no schools offering secondary education to Year 12 in Karumba or nearby; the alternatives are distance education or boarding school.

== Amenities ==
Karumba has a public library in Walker Street, visitor information centre, parks, bowls club, golf course, swimming pool, and a sports centre.

The Carpentaria Shire Council operates a public library at Walker Street.

St James' and St John's Community Church at 59 Yappar Street is shared by the Anglican, Catholic and Uniting congregations. It is within the Gulf Savannah Parish of the Roman Catholic Diocese of Cairns.

Regular services by the Uniting Church in Australia are held in the Community Church. These are provided by the McKay Patrol, an aerial service of the Uniting Church in Australia that operates out of Cloncurry. Supported by other denominations, the McKay Patrol operates a Cessna 182Q aeroplane to provide spiritual and practical help to people living in remote areas in the north-west of Queensland and the eastern Tablelands of the Northern Territory, an area of approximately 625,000 square kilometres (241,000 sq mi) with a population of less than 10,000 people.

== Attractions ==
Les Wilson Barramundi Discovery Centre at 149 Yappar Street (17.5025°S 140.8262°E) is a tourist attraction providing interactive experiences to learn about barramundi at a working barramundi hatchery.

== Climate ==
Karumba has a tropical savanna climate (Köppen Aw) with two distinct seasons. The "Wet" usually lasts from December to March and is hot and humid, with wet bulb temperatures typically above 27 °C or 80.6 °F during the afternoons. Most roads during the "Wet" are usually closed by heavy rain, which can exceed 250 millimetres or 9.84 inches in a day due to the passage of tropical cyclones or monsoonal depressions which provide most of the rain. On occasions, however, as with all of Queensland the wet season may fail almost completely and produce less than 350 millimetres (13.78 in) in a full season.

The "Dry" usually lasts from April to the middle of November and is much more comfortable due to lower humidity and milder morning temperatures. This period of the year is essentially bone dry and almost completely cloudless: median rainfall is nil between May and September and each month, over twenty days are completely clear.

Climate data for Karumba, Queensland (1938-2012)
Month	Jan	Feb	Mar	Apr	May	Jun	Jul	Aug	Sep	Oct	Nov	Dec	Year
Record high °C (°F)	39.8 (103.6)	37.6 (99.7)	38.4 (101.1)	38.9 (102.0)	34.5 (94.1)	32.8 (91.0)	32.4 (90.3)	35.4 (95.7)	36.9 (98.4)	40.4 (104.7)	40.7 (105.3)	41.3 (106.3)	41.3 (106.3)
Mean daily maximum °C (°F)	32.1 (89.8)	31.7 (89.1)	32.5 (90.5)	32.6 (90.7)	29.8 (85.6)	27.9 (82.2)	27.5 (81.5)	28.6 (83.5)	29.9 (85.8)	31.3 (88.3)	32.6 (90.7)	32.4 (90.3)	30.7 (87.3)
Mean daily minimum °C (°F)	24.4 (75.9)	24.1 (75.4)	23.2 (73.8)	20.7 (69.3)	17.2 (63.0)	15.2 (59.4)	14.0 (57.2)	15.2 (59.4)	18.2 (64.8)	21.0 (69.8)	23.3 (73.9)	24.4 (75.9)	20.1 (68.2)
Record low °C (°F)	19.6 (67.3)	18.3 (64.9)	18.0 (64.4)	13.6 (56.5)	8.0 (46.4)	6.9 (44.4)	6.1 (43.0)	5.3 (41.5)	10.6 (51.1)	12.2 (54.0)	17.8 (64.0)	17.9 (64.2)	5.3 (41.5)
Average rainfall mm (inches)	231.0 (9.09)	260.3 (10.25)	156.6 (6.17)	30.3 (1.19)	1.0 (0.04)	8.5 (0.33)	7.1 (0.28)	2.0 (0.08)	1.6 (0.06)	7.3 (0.29)	45.5 (1.79)	142.1 (5.59)	893.3 (35.16)
Average rainy days (≥ 0.2 mm)	12.7	14.7	9.3	2.8	0.4	1.0	0.6	0.4	0.4	0.9	4.2	8.9	56.3
Source: Australian Bureau of Meteorology

== See also ==
- Karumba Airport
