= Staaten River =

Staaten
- Location of the Staaten River mouth in Queensland

Location
- Country: Australia
- State: Queensland
- Region: Far North Queensland

Physical characteristics
- Source: Great Dividing Range
  - location: west of Torwood
  - coordinates: 17°15′32″S 143°30′44″E
  - elevation: 220 m (720 ft)
- Mouth: Gulf of Carpentaria
  - coordinates: 16°23′35″S 141°17′39″E
- Length: 383 km (238 mi)
- Basin size: 25,732 km^{2} (9,935 sq mi)
- Discharge
  - average: 35 m^{3}/s (1,200 cu ft/s)

Basin features
- National park: Staaten River National Park

The Staaten River is a river in northern Queensland, Australia, rising in the Great Dividing Range and flowing northwest into the Gulf of Carpentaria.

== Location and features ==
The river rises of the western slopes of the Great Dividing Range approximately 200 kilometres (120 mi) west of Cairns. The river flows generally northwest to the Staaten River National Park and then west, joined by eleven minor tributaries before reaching its mouth and emptying into the Gulf of Carpentaria. From source to mouth the river's waters overflow into intertwining lagoons that create an enormous wetland sanctuary for a vast array of unique wildlife and plants. When the rains of the wet season cease, the Staaten River retreats from the floodplains and wetlands and becomes little more than a thread trickling down wide sand banks and a string of important lagoon refuges. The river descends 220 metres (720 ft) over its 383-kilometre (238 mi) course.

There is very little development in the catchment, with grazing being the most common activity, and there are no major water storage facilities on the river. The river is navigable for 17 kilometres (11 mi) upstream until sand and rock bars are found. Dinah Island, located about 15 kilometres (9 mi) inland, is a small cattle property and at times provides short term accommodation for fishing enthusiasts.

=== Conservation and cultural values ===
The Staaten River catchment is one of Australia's last great wilderness areas. With little agricultural development, scant road access, and thriving forests and wildlife, it is a truly wild river system. The river straddles both the Cape York Peninsula and Gulf Country regions. Characterised by the replenishing floods of the wet season and an extensive network of lagoon refuges during the dry season, the river system is known for its excellent saratoga and barramundi fishing and saltwater crocodiles, one of Australia's best known animals.

The wet season is characterized by a large congregation of waterbirds from all over Australia and as far away as China and Russia. This birds live in the abundant waters of places like the huge Inkerman-Gilbrath Wetland, near the mouth of the catchment. The coastal margin of the Staaten River forms part of the Southeast Karumba Plan wetland aggregation, which is the best developed coastal wetland system in Queensland and provides critical habitat and breeding grounds for birds, fish, and other native wildlife. The Staaten River National Park in this area, covering around 467,000 hectares (1,150,000 acres), is one of Australia's largest and most remote national parks.

The Staaten Wild River Area covers about 25,700 square kilometres (9,900 sq mi) at the western base of Cape York Peninsula. The area contains the catchments of the Staaten River, Vanrook Creek, and ten major tributaries. The purpose of the wild river declaration is to "manage future development activity in the wild river area to ensure the wild river natural values are preserved".

=== Threats ===
The Staaten River is remote and currently there is little demand for water extraction in this area. The major present threat in this area is cattle grazing. If not managed sustainably, cattle can cause major soil erosion, trample vegetation, and pollute river systems. There are also minor infestations of the invasive weeds such as rubber-vine in the Staaten River. Wild River protection, as well as the Indigenous Wild River Ranger program, will help address these impacts.

== Indigenous heritage ==
The traditional owners of the upper catchment area are the Kunjen people.

The Agwamin, Kutjar, Koknar, Kunjen and Kokoberrin people are the traditional owners of the Staaten River catchment area and maintain strong cultural and spiritual connections with the land and rivers. The traditional ecological knowledge and health of these communities is in turn critical to the ongoing health of this wild river system.

== Etymology ==
The river was first named by Dutch sea explorer Jan Carstensz in 1623. It is named after the States General, the parliament of the Netherlands.

== See also ==
- List of rivers of Australia § Queensland
