= Staaten River National Park =

National park in Australia

- IUCN category II (national park)
- Location within Queensland
- Location: Queensland
- Nearest city: Chillagoe
- Coordinates: 16°15′19″S 142°40′46″E
- Area: 4,700 km^{2} (1,800 sq mi)
- Established: 1977
- Governing body: Queensland Parks and Wildlife Service

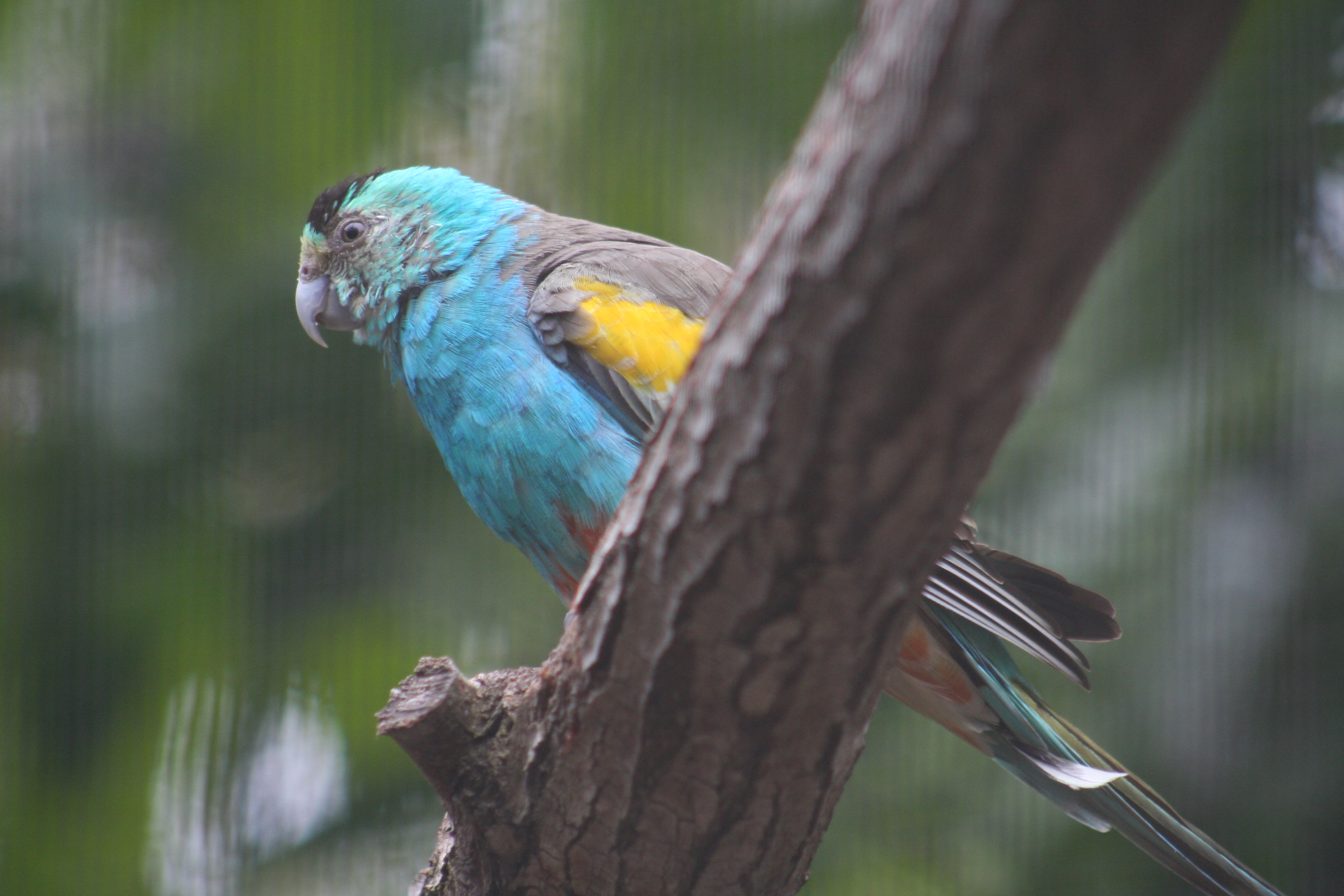
The park supports a population of up to a thousand endangered golden-shouldered parrots.

The Staaten River National Park is a national park in Queensland, Australia, 1,640 km northwest of Brisbane. It receives its name from the Staaten River which flows through the park.

== Environment ==
The park encompasses an extensive section of the least modified tropical savannas in Queensland. The vegetation is savanna woodland dissected by ephemeral streams with a small number of permanent or semi-permanent waterholes. It has few exotic weeds or introduced animals.

=== Important Bird Area ===
The park has been identified as an Important Bird Area (IBA) by BirdLife International because it supports a large population of up to a thousand endangered golden-shouldered parrots. Feral pigs destroy the parrots' nesting mounds and reduce the bird's food source. When conditions allow the pigs population to grow significantly, the animal is culled by the Queensland Parks and Wildlife Service.

It also supports populations of Australian bustards, bush stone-curlews, black-throated and masked finches, varied lorikeets, and yellow-tinted, banded, yellow and bar-breasted honeyeaters.

== See also ==
- Protected areas of Queensland
