= Gulf of Carpentaria =

Gulf of Northern Australia

Coordinates: 14°S 139°E

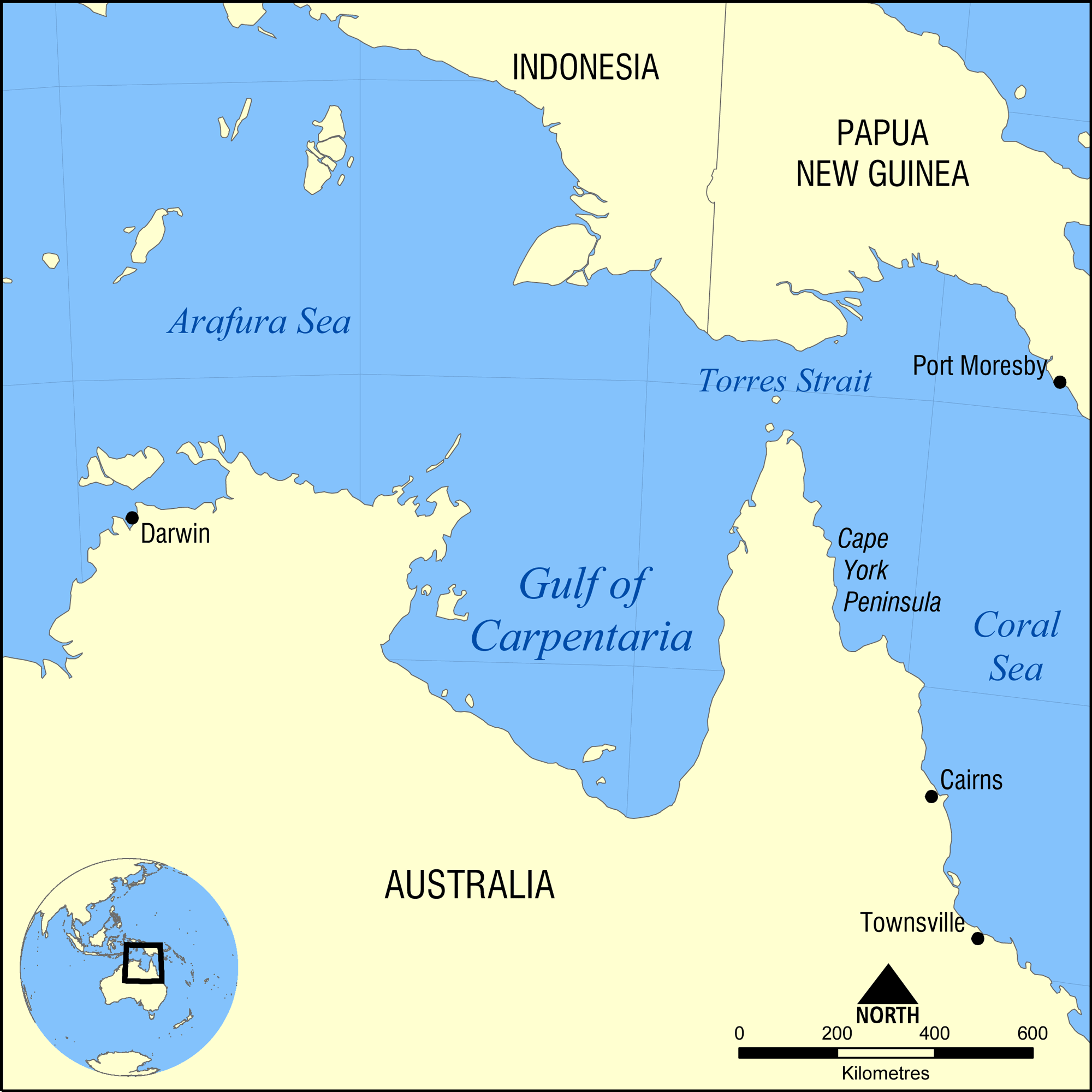
The location of the Gulf of Carpentaria. It covers a water area of about 300,000 km^{2} (120,000 sq mi).

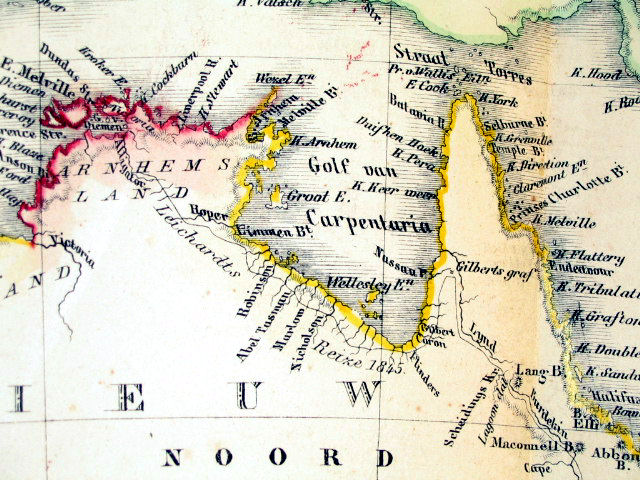
The Gulf of Carpentaria from an 1859 Dutch map

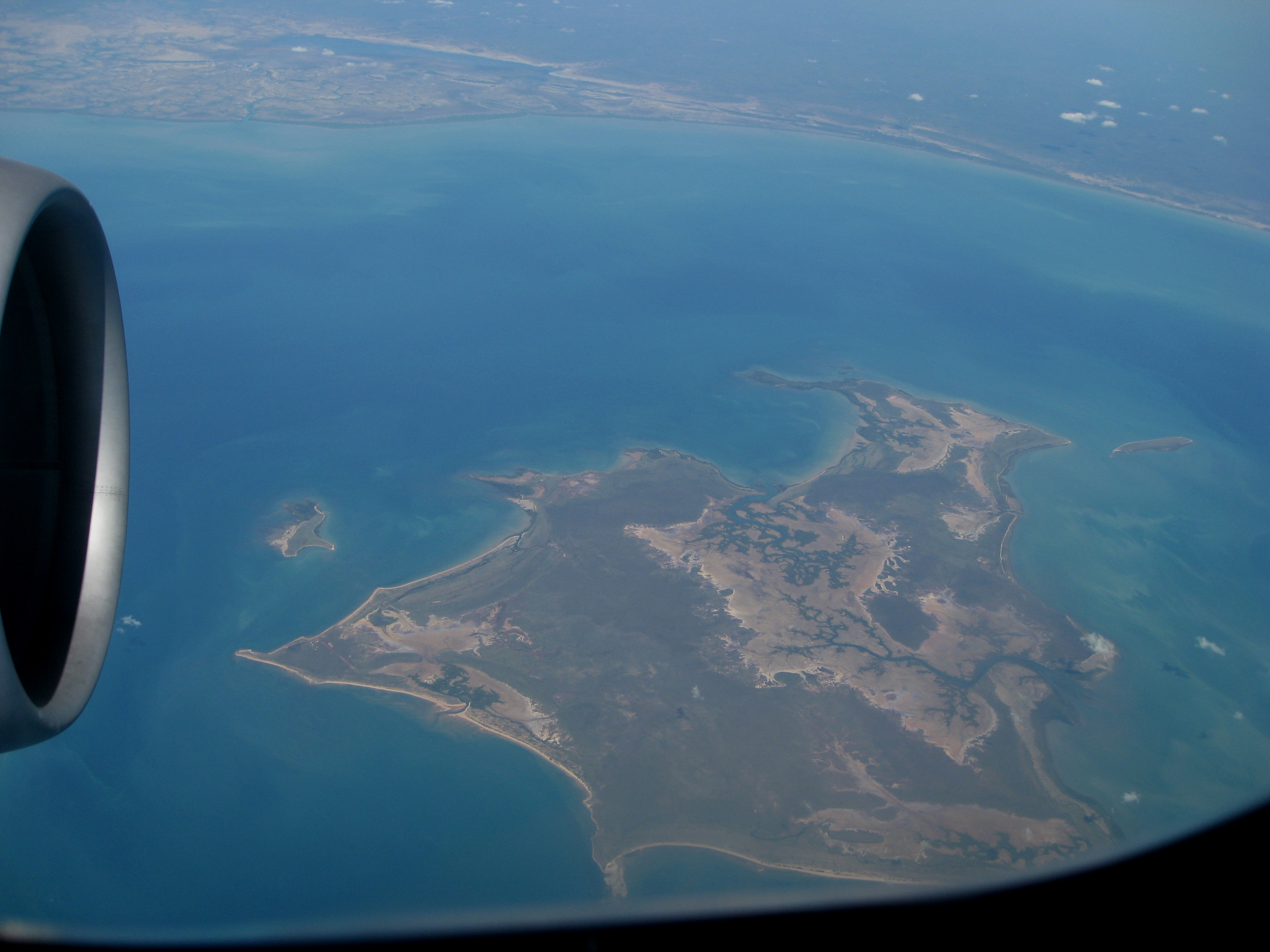
The Gulf of Carpentaria between Bentinck Island and the Australian continent

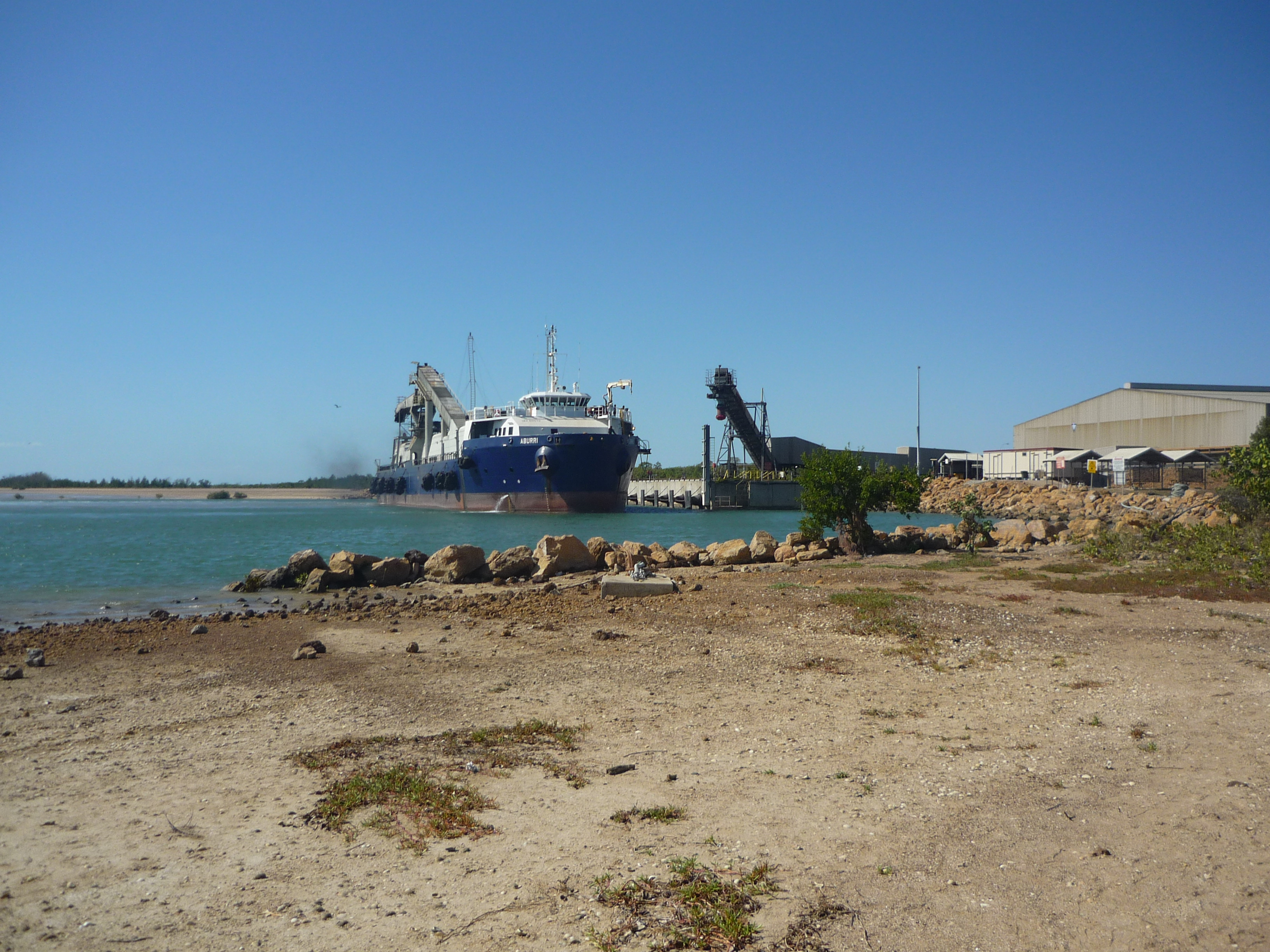
Loading ore from McArthur River zinc mine at Bing Bong Loading Facility, 2011

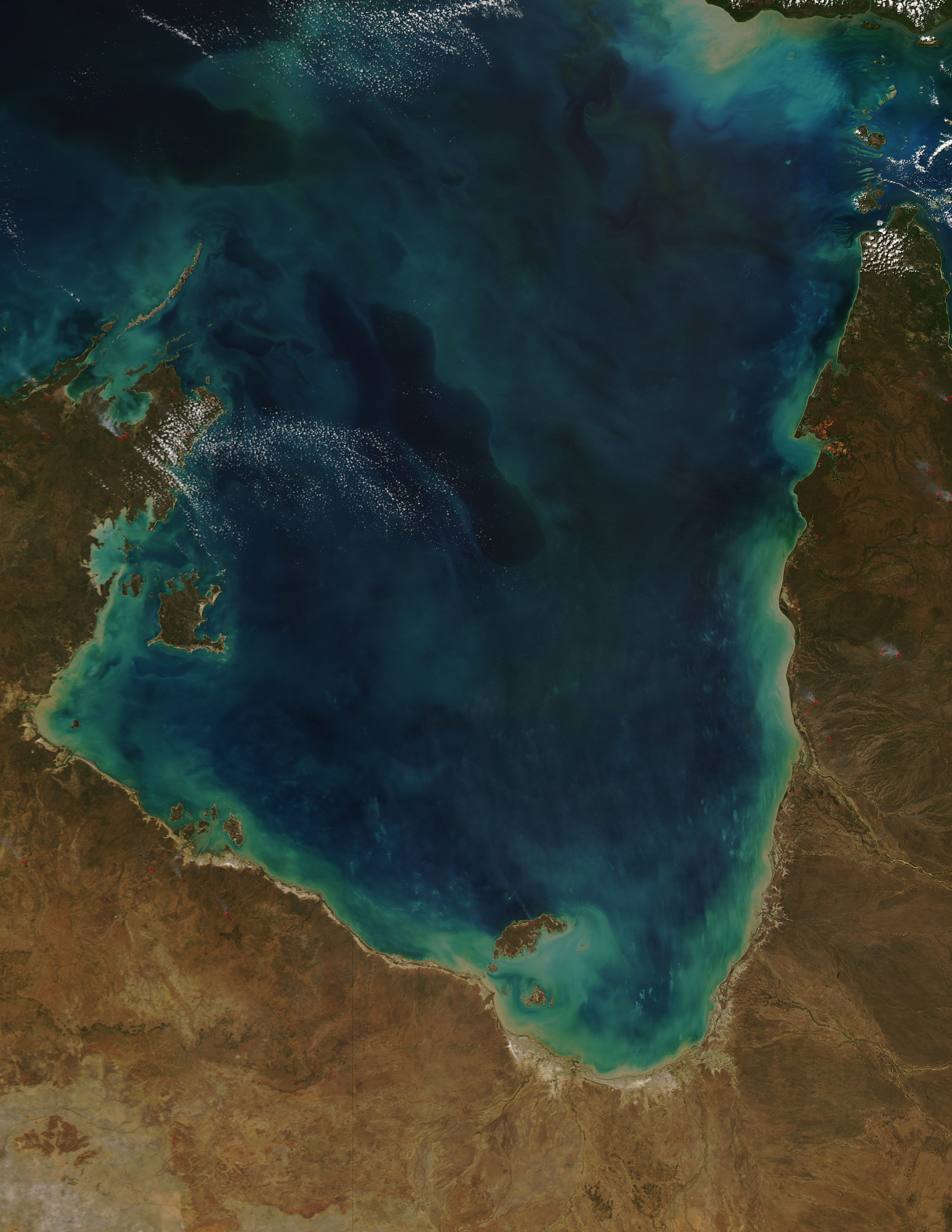
Gulf of Carpentaria from MODIS

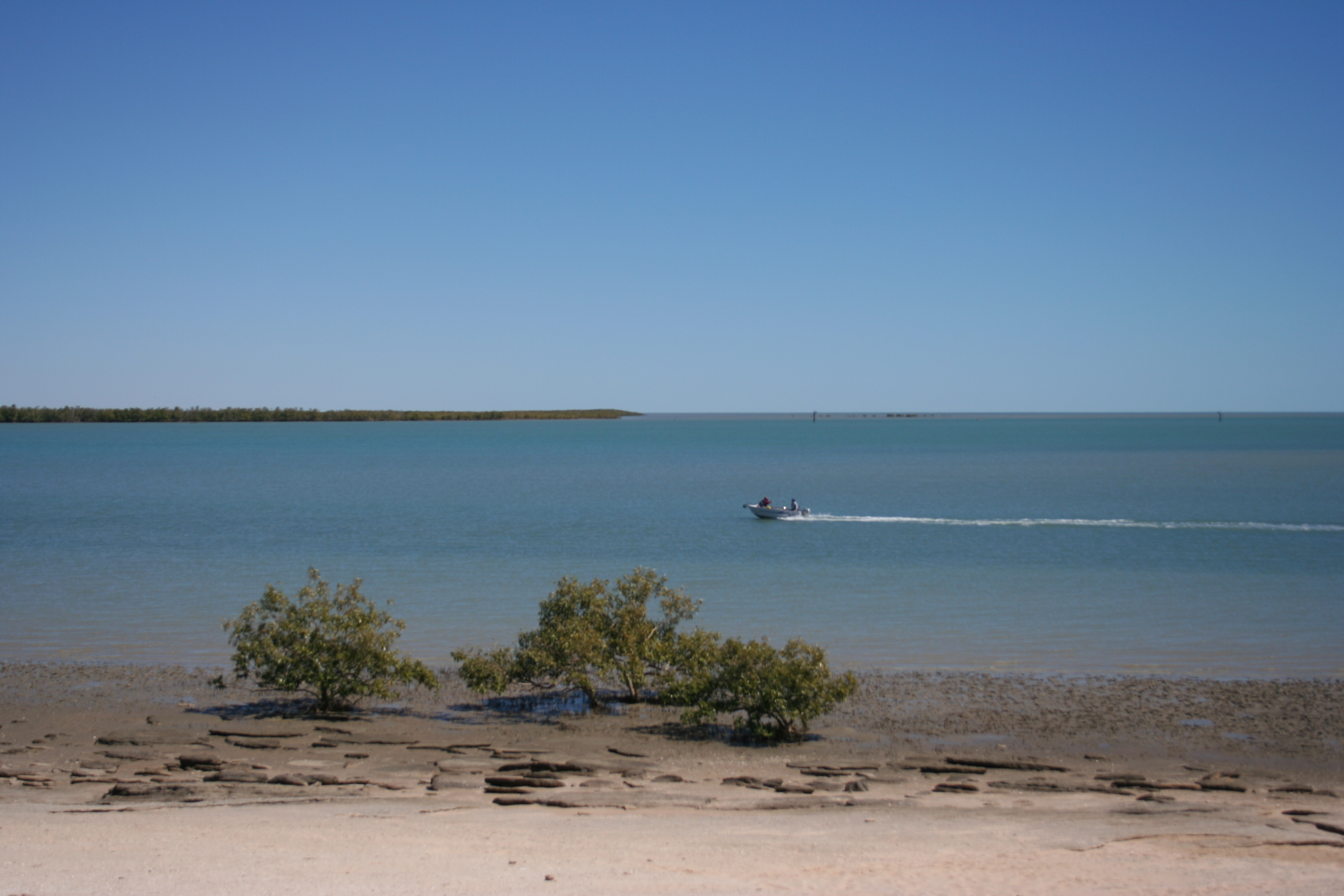
Karumba Beach, Karumba, Queensland

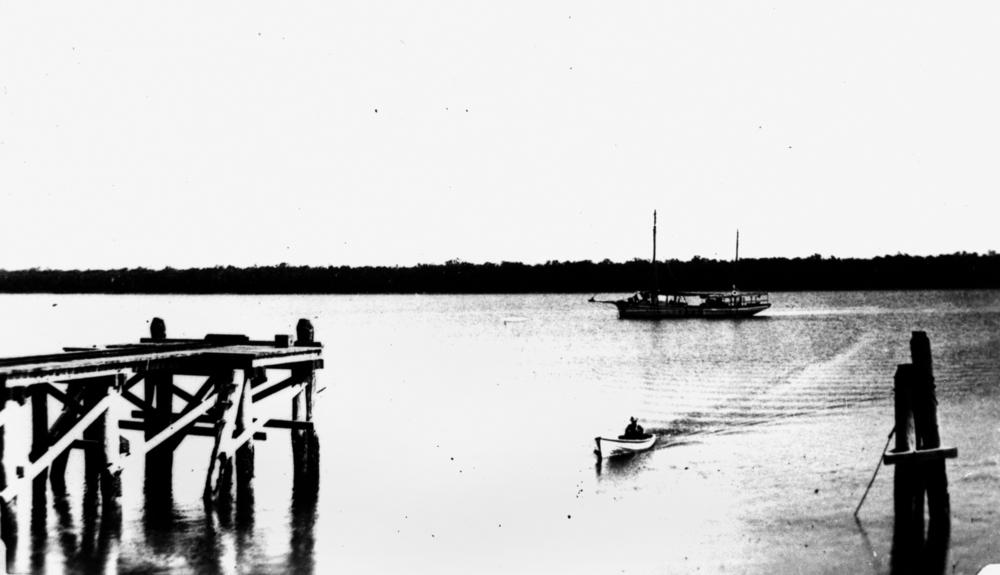
Melbidir II anchored off Karumba near the mouth of the Norman River

The Gulf of Carpentaria is a sea off the northern coast of Australia. It is enclosed on three sides by northern Australia and bounded on the north by the eastern Arafura Sea, which separates Australia and New Guinea. The northern boundary is generally defined as a line from Slade Point, Queensland (the northwestern corner of Cape York Peninsula) in the northeast, to Cape Arnhem on the Gove Peninsula, Northern Territory (the easternmost point of Arnhem Land), in the west.

At its mouth, the Gulf is 590 km (370 mi) wide, and further south, 675 km (420 mi). The north–south length exceeds 700 km (430 mi). It covers a water area of about 300,000 km^{2} (120,000 sq mi). The general depth is between 55 and 66 metres (30 and 36 fathoms) with a maximum depth of 69 metres (38 fathoms). The tidal range in the Gulf of Carpentaria is between two and three metres (6.5 and 10 ft). The Gulf and adjacent Sahul Shelf were dry land at the peak of the last ice age 18,000 years ago when global sea level was around 120 m (390 ft) below its present position. At that time a large, shallow lake occupied the centre of what is now the Gulf. The Gulf hosts a submerged coral reef province that was only recognised in 2004.

== History ==
Yulluna (also known as Yalarnga, Yalarrnga, Jalanga, Jalannga, Wonganja, Gunggalida, Jokula) is an Australian Aboriginal language. The Yulluna language region includes the local government boundaries of the Shire of Cloncurry.

Kayardild (also known as Kaiadilt and Gayadilta) is a language of the Gulf of Carpentaria. The Kayardild language region includes the landscape within the local government boundaries of the Mornington Shire Council.

The first European explorer to visit the region (and Australia) was the Dutch Willem Janszoon (whose name is also written as Jansz) in his 1605–06 voyage. His fellow countryman, Jan Carstenszoon (or Carstensz), visited in 1623 and named the gulf in honour of Pieter de Carpentier, at that time the Governor-General of the Dutch East Indies. Abel Tasman also explored the coast in 1644. The region was later explored and charted by the English navigator Matthew Flinders in 1802 and 1803.

The first overland expedition to reach the Gulf was the Burke and Wills expedition, led by Robert O'Hara Burke and William John Wills which left Melbourne, Victoria in August 1860 and reached the mouth of the Bynoe River in February 1861. However, both men died on the return journey.

== Geography ==
The land bordering the Gulf is generally flat and low-lying. To the west is Arnhem Land and Groote Eylandt, the largest island in the Gulf. To the east is the Cape York Peninsula and the Torres Strait which joins the Gulf to the Coral Sea. The area to the south (like the Cape York Peninsula, part of Queensland) is known as the Gulf Country.

The Gulf Country supports the world's largest intact savanna woodlands as well as native grasslands, known as the Carpentaria tropical savanna. The woodlands also extend up the west and east coast of the Gulf. They are dominated by Eucalyptus and Melaleuca species from the family Myrtaceae.

The climate is hot and humid with two seasons per year. The dry season lasts from about April until November and is characterized by very dry southeast to east winds, generated by migratory winter high pressure systems to the south. The wet season lasts from December to March. Most of the year's rainfall is compressed into these months, and during this period, many low-lying areas are flooded. The Gulf is prone to tropical cyclones during the period between November and April. The gulf experiences an average of three cyclones each year that are thought to transport sediments in a clockwise direction along the Gulf's coast.

In many other parts of Australia, there are dramatic climatic transitions over fairly short distances. The Great Dividing Range, which parallels the entire east and south-east coast, is responsible for the typical pattern of a well-watered coastal strip, a fairly narrow band of mountains, and then a vast, inward-draining plain that receives little rainfall. In the Gulf Country, however, there are no mountains to restrict rainfall to the coastal band and the transition from the profuse tropical growth of the seaside areas to the arid scrubs of central Australia is gradual.

In September and October the Morning Glory cloud appears in the Southern Gulf. The best vantage point to see this phenomenon is in the Burketown area shortly after dawn.

== Coral reefs ==
The Gulf of Carpentaria is known to contain fringing reefs and isolated coral colonies, but no near-surface patch or barrier reefs exist in the Gulf at the present time. However, this has not always been the case. Expeditions carried out by Geoscience Australia in 2003 and in 2005 aboard the RV Southern Surveyor revealed the presence of a submerged coral reef province covering at least 300 km^{2} (120 sq mi) in the southern Gulf. The patch reefs have their upper surfaces at a mean water depth of 28.6 ± 0.5 m (94 ± 1.5 ft), were undetected by satellites or aerial photographs, and were only recognised using multibeam swath sonar surveys supplemented with seabed sampling and video. Their existence points to an earlier, late Quaternary phase of framework reef growth under cooler-climate and lower sea level conditions than today.

== Major rivers ==
In the Top End, the Roper River, Walker River and Wilton River flow into the Gulf. The Cox River, Calvert River, Leichhardt River, McArthur River, Flinders River, Norman River and the Gilbert River drain the Gulf Country. A number of rivers flow from the Cape York Peninsula into the Gulf, including the Smithburne River, Mitchell River, Alice River, Staaten River, Mission River, Wenlock River, and Archer River.

== Industry ==
Extensive areas of seagrass beds have allowed commercial shrimp operations in the Gulf. Zinc, lead and silver is mined from the McArthur River zinc mine and exported via the Gulf. Another zinc mine, Century Zinc is in the gulf on the Queensland side of the border. It exports its product through the port facility at Karumba. The cattle industry is also a very important part of the regional economy in the gulf.

According to the then Chairman of the Gulf of Carpentaria's Commercial Fisherman's Organisation, Gary Ward, the number of sightings of Indonesian vessels fishing illegally in the gulf's waters increased in early 2005. By 2011, the numbers of illegal fishing boat interceptions had declined significantly with the cause attributed to enforcement efforts and education programs in Indonesia.

=== Major port plan ===
In 2012, a major new port located to the west of Karumba and rail connection to the North West Minerals Province was proposed by Carpentaria Rail. The advantages of a port at Karumba compared to Townsville was that it was three or four days closer to Asia via shipping routes. Additionally, expansion is taking place of the Bing Bong Port which services the McArthur River zinc mine, awarded the Northern Territory Earth award.

== Physiography ==
The Gulf is one of the distinct physiographic sections of the larger (and surrounding) Carpentaria Basin.

== See also ==
- Mangrove tree distribution
