= Koa (disambiguation) =

Koa is a species of tree endemic to Hawaii.

Koa or KOA may also refer to:

== Arts, entertainment, and media ==
- Kingdoms of Amalur: Reckoning, a 2012 video game
- KOA-TV, former call sign for KCNC-TV, an American television station
- KOA (AM), an American radio station

== Companies and organisations ==
- Kampgrounds of America, a franchise chain of North American campgrounds
- Kick Off Association, an organization for fans of the soccer simulation computer game Kick Off
- KOA Corporation of Japan
- Konami of America, the North American subsidiary of Konami, later known as Konami Corporation of America

== Languages ==
- Koya language, or Koa, a language of India
- Guwa language, or Koa, an Australian language

== People ==
- Koa people (Guwa), an Aboriginal Australian people
- Koa Misi (born 1987), American football player
- Koa Peat (born 2007), American basketball player
- Koa Santos (born 1999), American soccer player

== Other uses ==
- KOA, IATA code for Kona International Airport, Hawaii

== See also ==
- Mali-Koa Hood (born 1991), Australian singer-songwriter
