= Goa language =

Goa may refer to:

- Goan Konkani
- Guwa language
