= Eremophila hispida =

Scientific classification
- Kingdom: Plantae
- Clade: Embryophytes
- Clade: Tracheophytes
- Clade: Spermatophytes
- Clade: Angiosperms
- Clade: Eudicots
- Clade: Asterids
- Order: Lamiales
- Family: Scrophulariaceae
- Genus: Eremophila
- Species: E. hispida

Binomial name
- Eremophila hispida Chinnock

Species of flowering plant

Eremophila hispida is a flowering plant in the figwort family, Scrophulariaceae and is endemic to Queensland. It is a small shrub with narrow, hairy, clustered leaves, with violet to purple flowers and is restricted to a small area in central Queensland.

== Description ==
Eremophila hispida is a compact shrub usually growing to a height of less than 0.4 m (1 ft) with its branches mostly covered with a dense layer of hairs. Its leaves are densely clustered at the ends of the branches, mostly 10–25 mm (0.4–1 in) long, less than 1 mm (0.04 in) wide, linear in shape, usually densely covered in hairs and have their edges turned under. They also have a distinct midrib visible on the lower surface.

The flowers are borne singly in leaf axils on a very short stalk. There are 5 green, hairy, overlapping, tapering, lance-shaped to triangular sepals which are mostly 4–9 mm (0.2–0.4 in) long. The petals are 16–20 mm (0.6–0.8 in) long and are joined at their lower end to form a tube. The petal tube is purple to violet-coloured, the outside of the tube is usually hairy while the inner surface of the lobes is glabrous and the inside of the tube is filled with long, soft hairs. The 4 stamens are fully enclosed within the petal tube. The fruits are oval-shaped with a glabrous, papery covering and are 5.5–7 mm (0.2–0.3 in) long.

== Taxonomy and naming ==
The species was first formally described by Robert Chinnock in 2007 and the description was published in Eremophila and Allied Genera: A Monograph of the Plant Family Myoporaceae. The specific epithet (hispida) is a Latin word meaning "with rough hair or bristles".

== Distribution and habitat ==
Eremophila hispida grows in mulga and Corymbia terminalis woodland in brown loam and sand, mostly near Winton.

== Conservation status ==
Eremophila hispida is classified as "of least concern" in terms of the Queensland Nature Conservation Act.

== Use in horticulture ==
This eremophila has rarely been cultivated but its purple flowers and contrasting leaves indicate that it may have potential as a garden plant. It can be propagated from cuttings or by grafting and grown in well-drained soil in full sun. It is drought tolerant, needing only occasional watering but it needs to be protected from frost.
