= Koa language =

Koa may be,

- Koya language, India
- Guwa language, Australia
