= Corfield & Fitzmaurice Store =

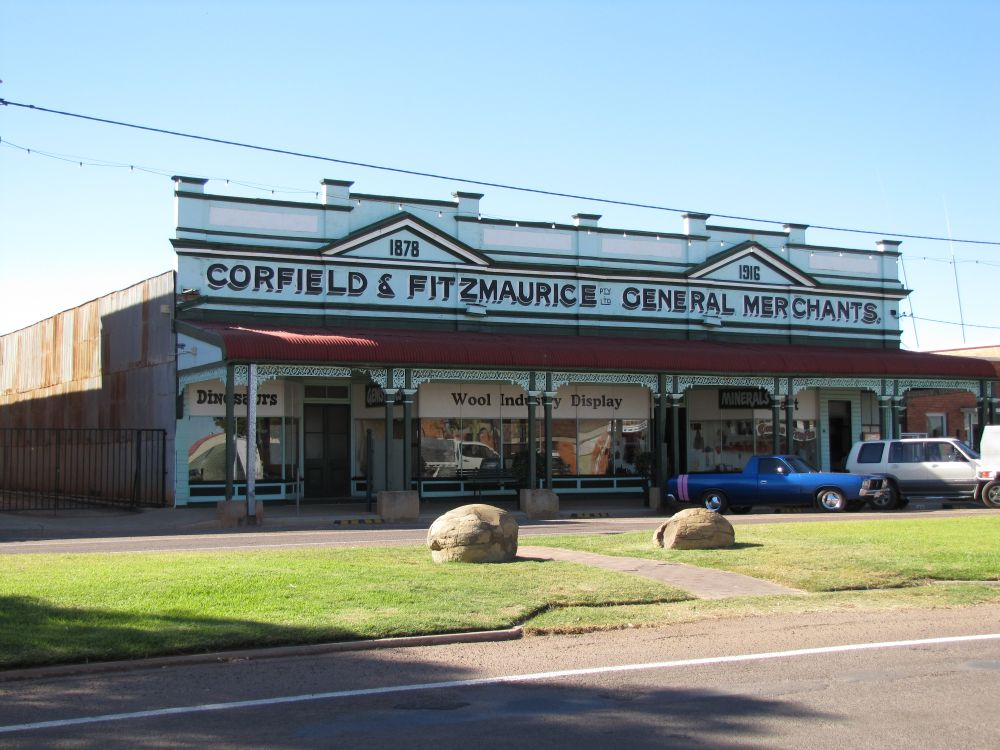
- Corfield & Fitzmaurice Store, 2013

- Location within Queensland
- 22.3895°S 143.0384°E
- Location: 63 Elderslie Street, Winton, Shire of Winton, Queensland, Australia

History
- Design period: 1914–1919 (World War I)
- Built: 1916

Queensland Heritage Register
- Official name: Corfield & Fitzmaurice Store
- Type: state heritage (built)
- Designated: 21 October 1992
- Reference no.: 600965
- Significant period: 1910s (fabric); 1916–1987 (historical use)
- Significant components: cold room/cold store, shed – storage, furniture/fittings

Corfield & Fitzmaurice Store is a heritage-listed former general store and now visitor centre at 63 Elderslie Street, Winton, Shire of Winton, Queensland, Australia. It was built in 1916. It was added to the Queensland Heritage Register on 21 October 1992.

== History ==
The current 1916 building is the latest in a succession of Corfield & Fitzmaurice stores on the same site which established the main street of Winton.

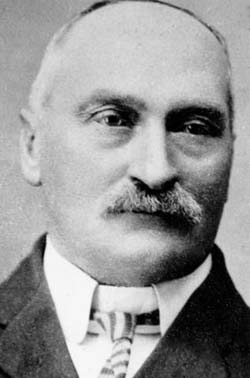
William Henry Corfield

The first pastoral run in the area was taken up around 1866 and the first lease was granted in 1873. Robert Allen, who also acted as an unofficial postmaster, had established a store and a basic hotel at Pelican Water Hole in 1876. This area proved to be subject to flooding, so when a site was surveyed for a township in 1878, a place about a mile away was selected. It was called Winton, after Allen's home in England. William Henry Corfield, who had been in the carrying business since the mid-1860s, formed a partnership with Robert Fitzmaurice to set up a store and hotel in the proposed new town.

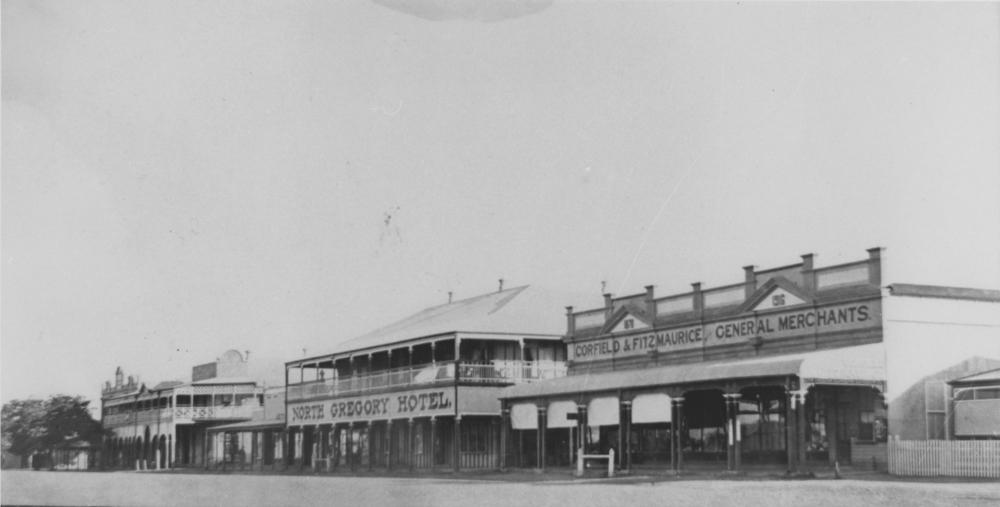
North Gregory Hotel and Corfield & Fitzmaurice Store, neighbours on Elderslie Street, 1930

The partners left Townsville in July 1878 with a load of goods and set up a primitive store of saplings and tarpaulin, placing it by agreement in line with Allen's relocated building and Lynett's store. This row of buildings became the basis for the main street of Winton. Corfield returned to Townsville with a backload of wool and came back with timber, iron and a billiard table for a new hotel, to be known as the North Gregory Hotel. Fitzmaurice then went to Townsville to collect his wife and child and to bring the materials necessary to construct a more permanent store building. Both buildings were completed by 1879 and did well. Winton was gazetted as a town in the same year and the streets were named after surrounding runs including Elderslie Street where the store is located.

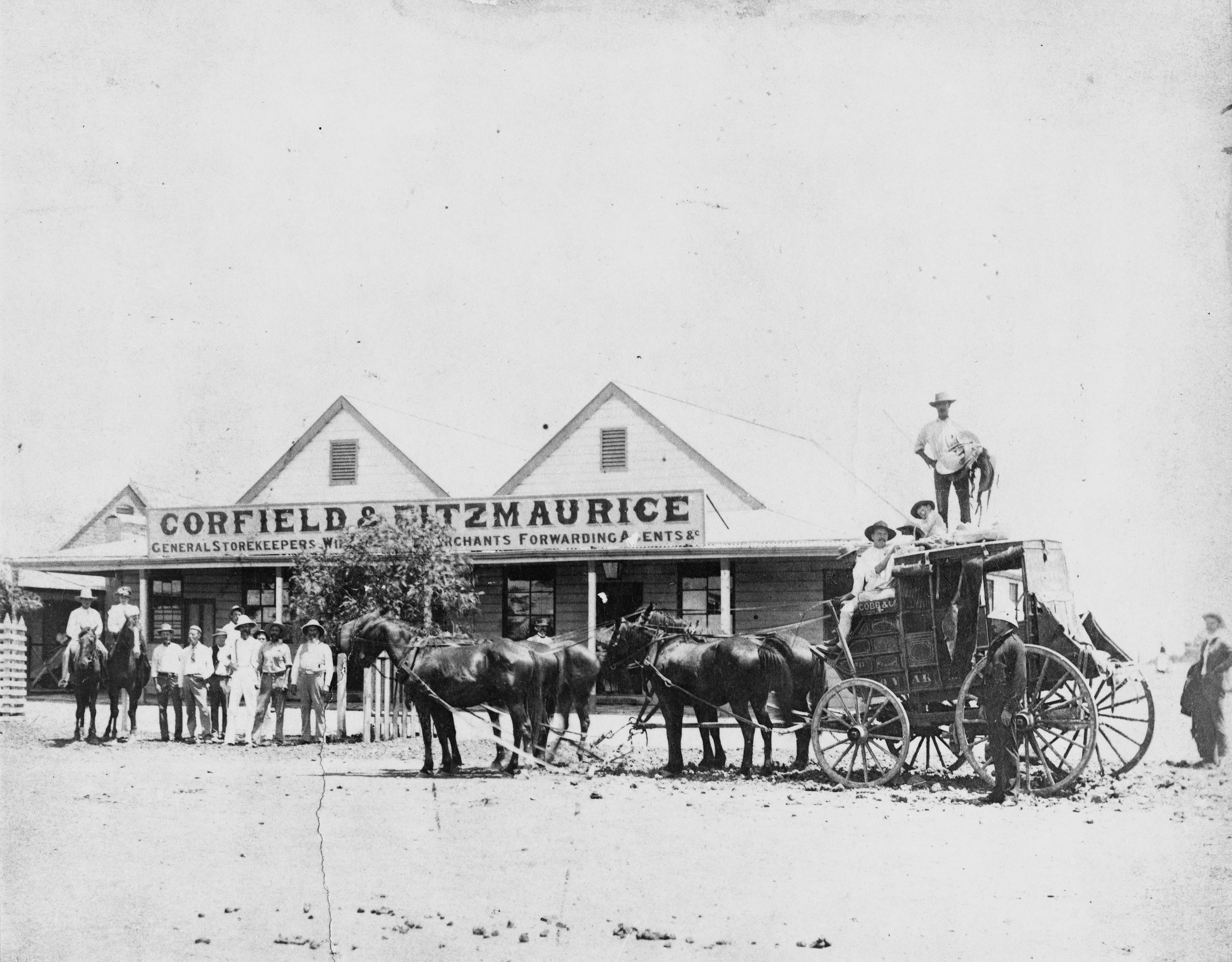
Cobb and Co coach outside Corfield & Fitzmaurice General Store, circa 1890

In 1880 the first land sales were held and Corfield and Fitzmaurice purchased the block on which their store stood. Winton flourished and soon had two stores, three hotels, a court house, bank and post office. By 1883 the population was 300 and increasing rapidly. In 1884 Fitzmaurice lost his sight and Corfield bought him out, selling the hotel on. He then went into partnership with W.M. Campbell. The transport company of Cobb and Co set up a depot in Winton in 1885 and Corfield became their agent. In 1888 he entered politics as a Member of the Queensland Legislative Assembly for Gregory, but in 1898 his partner became ill and Corfield returned to active participation in the business. Additions were carried out to the Corfield and Fitzmaurice store in 1899 by the Townsville architects Tunbridge and Tunbridge. This store was destroyed by fire in 1916 and was rebuilt. After Campbell's death, Thomas James O'Rourke went into partnership with Corfield and was still so in 1921 when Corfield wrote the book 'Reminiscences of Queensland.'

"Corfield and Fitzmaurice" remained a general store and warehouse supplying the surrounding area with a diverse range of goods and almost anything could be ordered through them. Orders were despatched to Brisbane and returned via rail or road. The store proper housed grocery, household goods and drapery sections and sheds to the rear of the store held liquor, grain and farming implements. A sample room was also provided in one of these sheds where commercial travellers could display their goods. Corfield and Fitzmaurice became a well-known and important store in the area and shopping there was also a social occasion for families from outlying areas.

The Corfield and Fitzmaurice Store ceased trading in 1987. In April 1994 the building reopened as the Corfield and Fitzmaurice Winton Tourism Development Centre Association. It is used to display and sell locally made craft items and features a display based on the store's history.

== Description ==
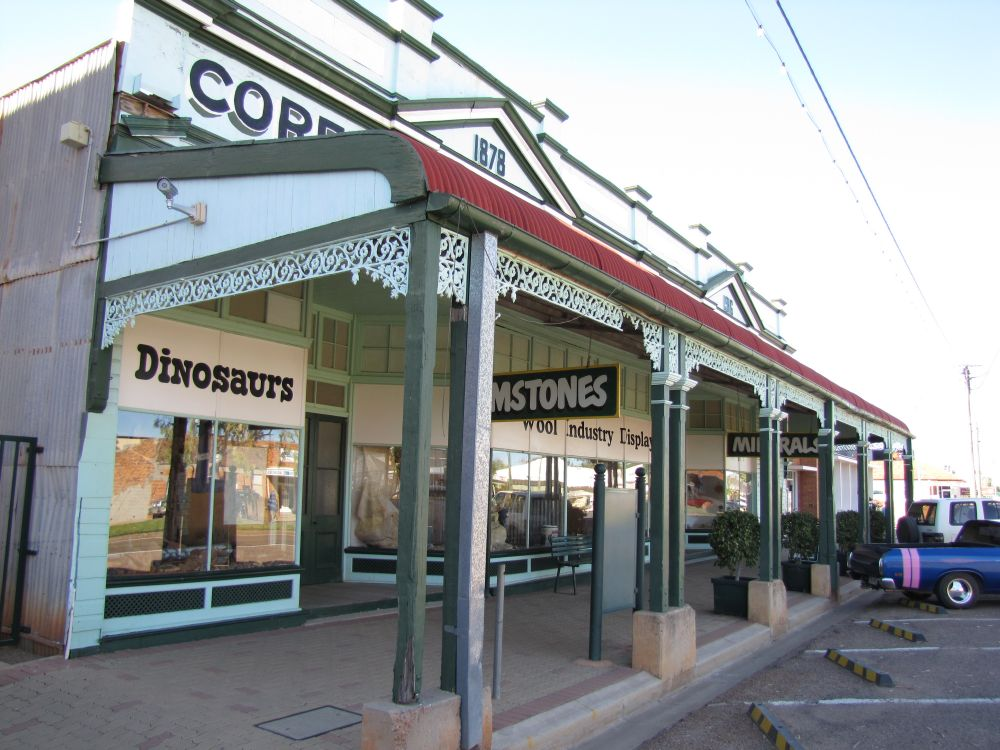
Closeup, 2013

The former Corfield and Fitzmaurice Store is a large, timber-framed building which is square in plan. The sides and rear of the building are clad with corrugated iron, as is the saw tooth roof. There are windows running along the sides high in the wall to supply good natural light to the interior. The street elevation of the building is more decorative and prestigious in appearance, being of timber and featuring a large expanse of display windows separated into two main sections by deeply recessed entrances. There is a small office on the right hand side of the building which is reached through a panelled door with a narrow sash window beside it. The shop front is shaded by a bull-nosed awning clad in corrugated iron and is supported by pairs of timber posts set in concrete blocks, probably an adaptation as the bases of the posts decayed. A decorative cast iron valance runs between the posts. The deep parapet above the awning is galvanised iron and features a pair of triangular pediments with the dates 1878 and 1916 above a deep entablature that carries the inscription "Corfield and Fitzmaurice Merchants". A stepped parapet completes the striking effect. At the rear of the building is an attached cold room clad in corrugated iron.

Internally the store appears to be largely intact and retains such features as early, long timber counters and timber storage shelving attached to the walls. A cash railway, known as a "flying fox", for transporting cash and receipts between the counter and a central timber office raised to mezzanine level still survives. The store is currently used for displays of local crafts, gemstones and minerals and a dinosaur diorama.

Behind the building are three rectangular storage sheds. They are set at right angles to the store and are set on low stumps and sheeted and roofed in corrugated iron.

== Heritage listing ==
Corfield & Fitzmaurice Store was listed on the Queensland Heritage Register on 21 October 1992 having satisfied the following criteria.

The place is important in demonstrating the evolution or pattern of Queensland's history.

The Corfield and Fitzmaurice Store is situated on land which has been the site of a store in Winton from the nineteenth century, and as such, demonstrates the development of the town as a commercial centre for the Western Plains district.

The place demonstrates rare, uncommon or endangered aspects of Queensland's cultural heritage.

The Corfield and Fitzmaurice store is rare for the intactness of its interior space complete with many fittings such as shelves, display cabinets and counters for a traditional range of merchandise organised into departments. In particular the cash railway, or flying fox dispenser, is a rare example in situ of money handling technology of the early twentieth century.

The place is important in demonstrating the principal characteristics of a particular class of cultural places.

Corfield and Fitzmaurice Store is an excellent and well preserved example of the kind of variety store and warehouse which provided a vital service to country areas in the supply of goods and services.

The place is important because of its aesthetic significance.

The elegant and well preserved shop front of Corfield and Fitzmaurice is a landmark in Winton and makes as major contribution to the character of its main street.

The place has a special association with the life or work of a particular person, group or organisation of importance in Queensland's history.

The building has special associations with the life and work of its original owners William Henry Corfield and Robert Fitzmaurice who were instrumental in the founding of Winton.
