= Koa people =

Aboriginal Australian people

The Koa (Guwa) are Australian Aboriginal people and native title holders of land in the Upper Diamantina River catchment area in the state of Queensland that includes the towns of Winton, Kynuna, Corfield and Middleton.

== Name ==
Tasaku Tsunoda and Gavan Breen have speculated that the ethnonym Koa may derive from a word *guwa meaning 'west'.

== Language ==
Walter Roth thought that the Koa language had affinities with that of the Maiawali, forming a linguistic bridge between it and the languages spoken by the Wanamara and Maithakari. Like many other peoples of the area, they had an extensive sign language, indicating a large number of meanings by gestures.

== Country ==
In Norman Tindale's estimation, the Koa's tribal territory ranged over about 10,000 square miles (26,000 km^{2}). Taking the headwaters of Diamantina as the centre, they extended north as far as Kynuna. Their western boundary lay around Middleton Creek, while to the east, their frontier was at Winton and Sesbania. Their southern limits were around Cork.

== Social organization, rites and practices ==
Neither circumcision nor subincision played any part in the Koa's initiatory rites into manhood. At least one Koa Bora ground, a gibber clearing threaded with portolaca, used to exist close to the homestead on Carisbrooke Station, southwest of Winton.

== History of contact ==
Comparatively little is known of the Koa, and, in one modern tradition of whites in the area, they just 'melted away' when Europeans began to settle in their territory.

== Native title ==
In 1998 grazier Noel Kennedy applied to the Federal Court to have his property Castle Hill declared to be free of native title. This was challenged by the descendants of the Koa the following year, in a counterclaim for native title to the Castle Hill Pastoral Holding and the Bladensburg National Park in the Shire of Winton. In mid-2002 a Federal Court declared that the Koa claim did not apply to Kennedy's pastoral lands because the Koa could not demonstrate continuity of cultural practices in that area over the last half-century. In 2015, a further claim to title was made by the Koa, and on 6 October 2021 the Federal Court of Australia recognised the Koa people as native title holders of land and waters covering 31,400 square kilometres.

== Alternative names ==
- Goa
- Goamulgo
- Coa
- Coah
- Guwa

== Some words ==
- mikamo (wild dog or dingo)
- kobba (father)
- yanga (mother)
- witto (white man)
- kungoyi (purslane/pigweed)
- tundooroola (acicular-tip spear)

== Sources ==
- Anon, Coah (1897). "Tribal dialect near Kynuna". Australian Anthropological Journal. 1 (3). Sydney: 16–17.
- Bennett, Samuel (1867). The History of Australian Discovery and Colonisation (PDF). Sydney: Hanson and Bennett.
- "Court rules property free of native title". ABC News. 14 June 2002.
- Curr, Edward (1887a). "Diamantina River, Middleton Creek,-The Goa tribe" (PDF). In Curr, Edward Micklethwaite (ed.). The Australian race: its origin, languages, customs, place of landing in Australia and the routes by which it spread itself over the continent. Vol. 3. Melbourne: J. Ferres. pp. 14–15.
- Curr, Montagu (1887b). "head of Diamantina" (PDF). In Curr, Edward Micklethwaite (ed.). The Australian race: its origin, languages, customs, place of landing in Australia and the routes by which it spread itself over the continent. Vol. 3. Melbourne: J. Ferres. pp. 12–13.
- Haines, John (1887). "Western River" (PDF). In Curr, Edward Micklethwaite (ed.). The Australian race: its origin, languages, customs, place of landing in Australia and the routes by which it spread itself over the continent. Vol. 3. Melbourne: J. Ferres. pp. 16–17.
- "Koa People (QC2015/007)". National Native Title Tribunal. 16 July 2015.
- Lamb, E. C. (1899a). "Goa dialect, Diamantina River, Queensland". Science of Man. 2 (3). Sydney: 42.
- Lamb, E. C. (1899b). "Goa dialect, Diamantina River, Queensland". Science of Man. 2 (9). Sydney: 154–155.
- Lamb, E. C. (1904). "Goa and Myalli language". Science of Man. 7 (3). Sydney: 27.
- Lauterer, J. (1897). "Aboriginal languages of eastern Australia compared". Proceedings of the Royal Society of Queensland. 12. Brisbane: 11–16. doi:10.5962/p.351257. S2CID 257134113.
- May, David (16 October 2011). "Digging the digs in The Outback". The Australian.
- "Queensland" (PDF). Australasian Legal Information Institute. 2000.
- Roth, W. E. (1897). Ethnological Studies among the North-West-Central Queensland Aborigines (PDF). Brisbane: Edmund Gregory, Government Printer.
- Tindale, Norman Barnett (1974). "Koa (QLD)". Aboriginal Tribes of Australia: Their Terrain, Environmental Controls, Distribution, Limits, and Proper Names. Australian National University Press. ISBN 978-0-708-10741-6.
- Tsunoda, Tasaku (2012). A Grammar of Worrongo. Walter de Gruyter. ISBN 978-3-110-23877-8.
