= Guwa =

Guwa may refer to:

- Guwa language, an Australian Aboriginal language
- Sechen Guwa (born 1950), a Swiss actress
