= Elderslie Homestead =

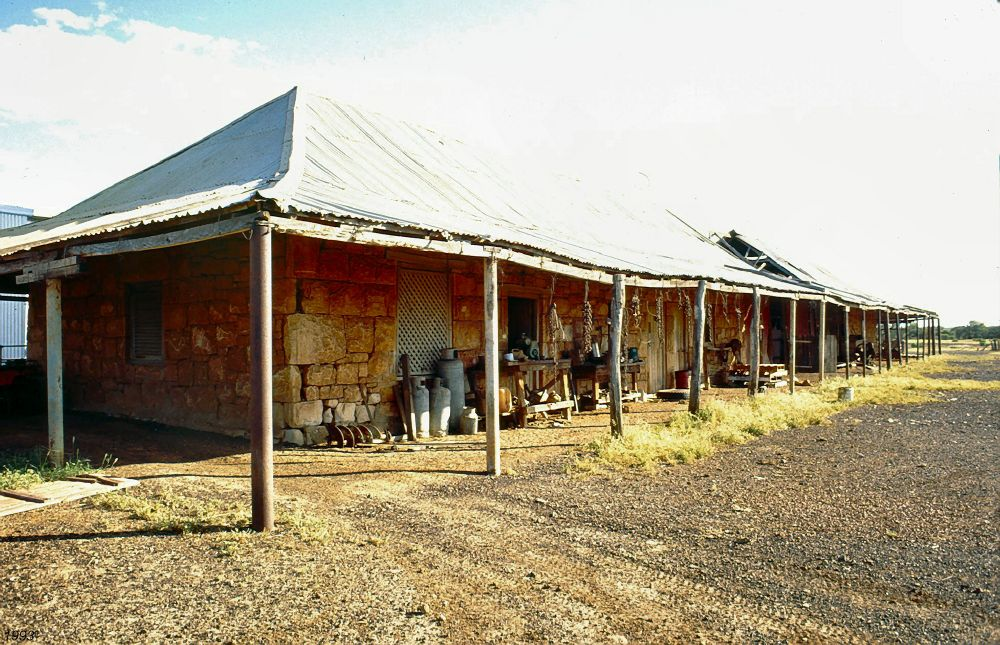
- Elderslie Homestead, 1993

- Location within Queensland
- 22.3001°S 142.4344°E
- Location: Elderslie Station, Winton–Boulia Road, Middleton, Shire of Winton, Queensland, Australia

History
- Design period: 1870s–1890s (late 19th century)
- Built: 1881–c. 1912

Queensland Heritage Register
- Official name: Elderslie Homestead
- Type: state heritage (landscape, built)
- Designated: 21 October 1992
- Reference no.: 600966
- Significant period: 1880s–1900s (historical) ongoing (social)
- Significant components: residential accommodation – staff quarters, shed – livestock, tank stand, meat house, shop – blacksmith's, views from, out building/s, residential accommodation – main house, graveyard

Elderslie Homestead is a heritage-listed homestead at the Elderslie Station, Winton–Boulia Road, Middleton, Shire of Winton, Queensland, Australia. It was built from 1881 to c. 1912. It was added to the Queensland Heritage Register on 21 October 1992.

== History ==
Elderslie Homestead is about 60 kilometres (37 mi) west of Winton and it is a complex of accommodation and working buildings set against the backdrop of Mount Booka Booka in an otherwise flat landscape. Three of the surviving buildings were constructed of local stone in the early 1880s as the nucleus of Elderslie Station.

The area in which Elderslie Station is located was explored by William Landsborough and surveyor George Phillips in 1866, although some pioneer pastoralists had settled in the area as early as 1863. Severe drought in the late 1860s compelled some to leave, but there was a new wave of settlement in the early 1870s when the drought broke and interest in pastoralism grew due to rising wool prices. 1n 1873 the area was declared a pastoral district and a detailed survey of the Western River and environs was carried out in 1876.

In 1873 Samuel Forsyth took up thirteen runs along the Diamantina and Western Rivers. In 1875, seven adjacent leases were granted to Donald Smith Wallace. It is thought that Wallace may have chosen the name Elderslie for its link with his famous namesake, the Scottish patriot William Wallace of Elderslie. The first buildings on Elderslie were constructed prior to 1875, and are thought to have comprised a pisé homestead and yards. A shanty and store were later erected nearby. In 1876, this area was flooded, and the store was moved to higher ground approximately a mile away. This later became the site of the township of Winton, with an area resumed from the Elderslie holdings for the purpose.

By 1879, all leases (a total of 21 runs) were transferred to the prominent Victorian pastoralist, Samuel Wilson. Wilson had come from England to the Victorian goldfields in the 1850s and had also managed a sheep station for his brother in that colony. His success in this industry was spectacular and he built up a pastoral empire with holdings in various states. He also became involved in Victorian politics and was a member of the Legislative Assembly and the Legislative Council. A munificent gift of £30,000 to Melbourne University was followed by a knighthood in 1875 and he moved back to England where he took up the former estate of Lord Beaconsfield and attempted to enter British politics. Although he retained ownership of Elderslie until his death in 1895, his interest in the place was therefore as a business property rather than a home. This is visible in the buildings at Elderslie which are functional working buildings rather than the residence of a wealthy man with social and political aspirations.

In 1881, substantial capital was invested in Elderslie in the form of a new homestead complex constructed some forty kilometres away from the original homestead at Wallace's Camp. This may have been because this site had flooded, was too close to the budding township of Winton, or simply because the new site was more centrally placed in the Elderslie holding.

The new homestead complex was erected no later than 1882 beneath Mount Booka-Booka, which provided the sandstone for the structures. The building technique and materials are similar to those at nearby Oondooroo Station, and it is thought that both complexes were constructed by a German stonemason with the assistance of locally available Chinese labour.

In 1891, an inspector for the Department of Public Lands described the Elderslie complex as including the homestead house, laundry and servants' rooms, kitchen, butcher's shop, men's hut, store and cottage, cottage, carpenters, wheelwrights and saddler's shop, gardeners cottage and garden, four earth dams, an overshop and 62 miles (100 km) of fencing. Of these, only five buildings survive today, however, they are sufficient to demonstrate the layout and use of the homestead. Curiously, Wilson appears to have used the property to run only cattle, given that he had previous experience with sheep and that wool prices were high when he had acquired the station. Sheep were not introduced until the subsequent owners restocked.

The extant structures and the evidence of those which no longer exist indicate the scale of the property at this time. The station supported a large number of workers, reputedly up to ninety at its peak, and the infrastructure required would have been considerable. Early photographic and documentary records show large gardens, both productive and decorative, and that social needs for the Elderslie community were considered, with a School of Arts registered at the station in 1896.

In 1892, Elderslie was divided into two parts, one of approximately 4,400 square kilometres leased to Wilson and approximately half that amount intended to be subdivided for closer settlement, but over which Wilson had a lease to occupy. On Wilson's death, both sections were transferred to the Ramsay family. By 1912, the Ramsays had stocked the property with sheep, established horse studs and sunk three artesian bores. The additions to the house which created its present form probably occurred during this time. Although the period in which the Ramsays occupied Elderslie was a difficult one, coinciding with severe droughts and large resumptions of land, they managed to sell the property debt-free to the Queensland Stock Breeding Company Limited in 1912.

After the First World War, further land resumptions for closer settlement were made and in 1924, Elderslie was transferred to the Australian Estates and Mortgage Company Limited who retained ownership until 1950. At this time the entire holding was resumed and divided into several grazing leases which were opened for selection. During the 1950s the verandahs were reconstructed and a hip extended to the south east of the first extension to create a bathroom and laundry. The kitchen was also relocated to the northern corner of the building and the verandahs were flyscreened. In 1954, the homestead block was purchased by Mr and Mrs Keith Watts. The original Elderslie buildings were by then in serious state of disrepair, and the Watts were instrumental in retaining and repairing them. Elderslie remains in this family.

The homestead complex has been, and continues to be, the subject of studies including a conservation plan prepared in 1991. In 1993 some conservation work was carried out on the blacksmiths building and quarters. The buildings have continued to suffer through storms which are common in this area due to the thermal conditions.

Although the homestead complex serves an area very much reduced from the original holding, it continues its original role as it has for over one hundred years.

== Description ==
Elderslie Homestead is located near the confluence of the Western River and Wokingham Creek, three kilometres north west of the residual sandstone outcrop of Mt Booka Booka. Only this outcrop and the slight rise on which the homestead is located break the horizontal plane of the surrounding landscape. The homestead gardens provide a striking contrast to the sparse natural vegetation of the area.

The complex comprises accommodation and working buildings. Three buildings constructed from Booka Booka sandstone remain. These are the main house, quarters and blacksmith's building. There is also a timber and metal meat house and visible sites of several other structures. The main house is constructed from squared rubble, with dressed faces. Door openings are picked out with finely tooled margins. This method of construction is more refined than that used for the other buildings which are of coursed rubble. The original 1881 section was essentially a one room deep rectangular structure with verandahs to all sides. An early wing was added to the north west side to form an L-shape and the verandah has been extended to encircle this addition. The construction techniques used for the addition are cruder, using random rubble stone, rendered and struck to imitate ashlar. The hipped roof is sheeted with corrugated iron. The rooms have concrete floors and rendered walls, most of which open out on to the verandahs but are not interconnecting. The main rooms are lined and ceiled with pressed metal panelling. Three of the rooms have fireplaces. The entire verandah is enclosed with flyscreens.

The blacksmiths shop is a long rectangular building constructed of coursed rubble sandstone blocks laid straight on the ground. It has an iron roof and an encircling verandah set on a hardwood frame. Most of the verandah posts have been replaced with steel posts. The building has three similarly sized rooms at the eastern end, comprising a butcher's, store and office. At the western end are the former stables and between there is a semi-open area which was the blacksmith's shop and harness room.

The quarters provided accommodation for senior staff and consists of two equally sized rooms separated by a wall with a double fireplace. The construction is similar to that of the blacksmith's shop with coursed rubble walls and a hipped roof sheeted with corrugated iron. Verandahs surround the building. The roof frame and verandah posts are of bush timber. The interior of both rooms are rendered and show traces of lime wash. Both rooms have stone paved floors.

The meat house is a lightweight structure to the north of the quarters. It has flat steel sheets over a hardwood frame reaching to high sills and is flyscreened above. The roof and verandah are framed in hardwood and sheeted with corrugated iron which replaced the original thatched roof.

Other buildings on site include a cowshed to the north of the main group, tankstands possibly dating to the early 1900s and a garage and prefabricated steel shed for machinery and vehicles.

There is a small cemetery near the homestead complex. Records suggests that it was first used in 1882.

== Heritage listing ==
Elderslie Homestead was listed on the Queensland Heritage Register on 21 October 1992 having satisfied the following criteria.

The place is important in demonstrating the evolution or pattern of Queensland's history.

Elderslie Homestead is important in demonstrating how European settlement spread in remote parts of Queensland through exploration and pastoral usage, followed by closer settlement and the growth of service towns. The town of Winton is located near the site of the original homestead and may well have affected the choice of location for the homestead complex.

The place demonstrates rare, uncommon or endangered aspects of Queensland's cultural heritage.

It is rare in Queensland to find intact and substantial stone buildings from this era in such a remote setting.

The place has potential to yield information that will contribute to an understanding of Queensland's history.

The buildings and the sites for previous structures, including accommodation and working buildings, gardens, graves, fences and mature trees. have the potential to contribute to our understanding of how such pastoral stations functioned and to demonstrate their principal characteristics over the hundred and twenty years in which the homestead has been in use.

The place is important in demonstrating the principal characteristics of a particular class of cultural places.

The buildings and the sites for previous structures, including accommodation and working buildings, gardens, graves, fences and mature trees. have the potential to contribute to our understanding of how such pastoral stations functioned and to demonstrate their principal characteristics over the hundred and twenty years in which the homestead has been in use.

The place is important because of its aesthetic significance.

Elderslie homestead makes an important aesthetic contribution to the landscape, its low and simple buildings and the use of sandstone from Mt Booka Booka forming a harmonious link between this dominant geographical feature and the flat and barren landscape of the surrounding area.

The place has a strong or special association with a particular community or cultural group for social, cultural or spiritual reasons.

As the first station in the far north west, Elderslie has special connection to the people of Winton, whose main street is named in its honour, and with those pioneers of the pastoral industry within and around Elderslie's boundaries.
