= Opalton =

- Suburb
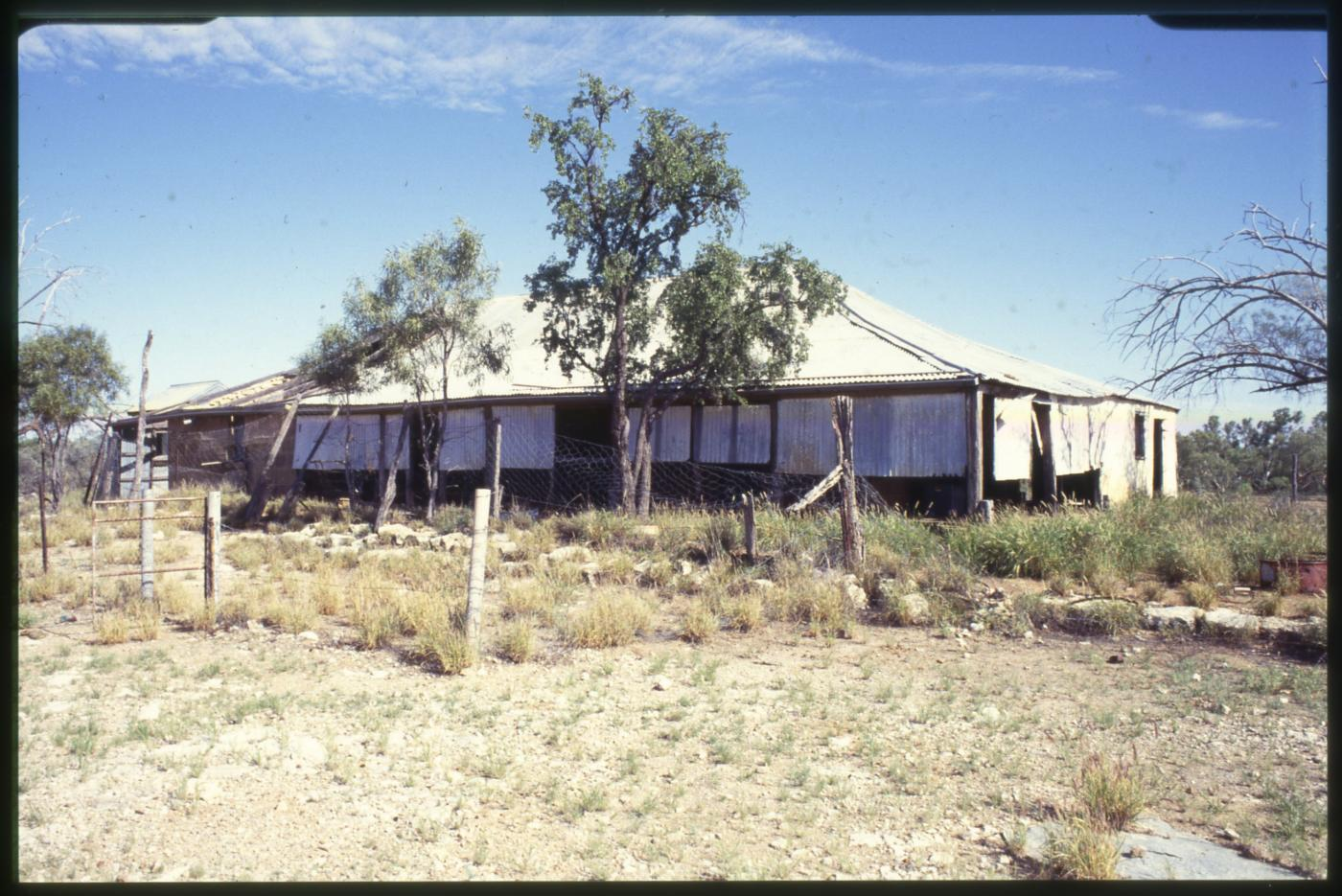
- Old Cork Homestead, erected 1870s

- Interactive map of Opalton
- Coordinates: 23.2474°S 142.77095°E
- Country: Australia
- State: Queensland
- LGA: Shire of Winton
- Location: 119 km (74 mi) SSE of Winton; 176 km (109 mi) W of Longreach; 863 km (536 mi) W of Rockhampton; 1,354 km (841 mi) NW of Brisbane

Government
  - State electorate: Gregory
  - Federal division: Maranoa

Area
  - Total: 16,932.3 km^{2} (6,537.6 sq mi)

Population
  - Total: 59 (2021 census)
  - Density: 0.003484/km^{2} (0.00902/sq mi)
- Time zone: UTC+10:00 (AEST)
- Postcode: 4735
Suburbs around Opalton
Middleton	Middleton	Corfield; Winton
Middleton	Opalton	Longreach
Diamantina Lakes	Stonehenge	Longreach

Opalton is a outback rural locality in the Shire of Winton, Queensland, Australia. It is known for the Opalton Opal Field, one of the largest and most extensively worked opal deposits in Queensland. In the 2021 census, Opalton had a population of 59 people.

== Geography ==
There are two protected areas within the locality:

- Bladensburg National Park in the north-west of the locality
- Lark Quarry Conservation Park in the centre of the locality

Apart from the protected areas, the land use is grazing on native vegetation.

== History ==
The Cork homestead was established in the 1870s. It was built from sandstone. It was partly owned by Thomas McIlwraith, Premier of Queensland. It is now a ruin.

== Demographics ==
In the 2016 census, Opalton had a population of 64 people.

In the 2021 census, Opalton had a population of 59 people.

== Education ==
There are no schools in Opalton. The nearest government primary and secondary school is Winton State School (Prep to Year 12) in neighbouring Winton to the north-east. However, only students in the north-east of Opalton woud be within range of a daily commute to Winton. The alternatives are distance education and boarding school.

== Attractions ==
Lark Quarry Conservation Park is at the end of Lark Quarry Access Road (23.0154°S 142.4110°E). It has the world’s only known dinosaur stampede site.

Scrammy Lookout is in Bladensburg National Park (22.5554°S 143.1374°E).

The Opalton Opal Field is popular with tourists as a place for fossicking.
