= William Henry Corfield (politician) =

Australian politician

William Corfield
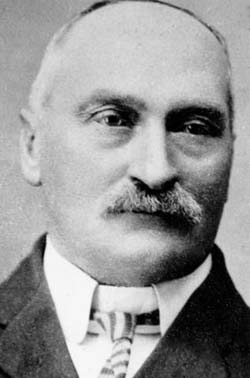

Member of the Queensland Legislative Assembly for Gregory
- In office 28 April 1888 – 25 March 1899
- Preceded by: Thomas McWhannell
- Succeeded by: William Hamilton

Personal details
- Born: William Henry Corfield; 1843 Yeovil, Somerset, England
- Died: 1927 (aged 83–84) Brisbane, Australia
- Resting place: Toowong Cemetery
- Party: Ministerial
- Spouse: Ellen Wood (m.1879)
- Occupation: Autobiographer, Bullocky, Publican

William Henry Corfield (1843–1927) was a carrier, publican, storekeeper and politician in Queensland, Australia. He was a Member of the Queensland Legislative Assembly.

== Early life ==
William Henry Corifield was born at Yeovil, Somerset, England in 1843, the son of James and Ann (née Pitfield) Corfield. He attend Kingston School in Yeovil and Spa Villa Academy in Melksham, Wiltshire.

Aged 19 years, he migrated to Queensland in 1862 where he initially acquainted himself with Queensland bush life working for his uncle, H. C. Corfield on his property "Stanton Harcourt" near Maryborough. In 1864 he travelled overland to Clifton Station on the Cloncurry River where he worked. In 1867, he tried his luck on the Cape River goldfields but was unsuccessful.

== Business interests ==
Deciding there was more money to be made servicing the goldfields than mining them, Corfield established a carrying business in about 1868. Using bullock teams, he transported goods from the coastal ports to the various Queensland goldfields. In 1878, he formed a partnership with his brother-in-law, Robert Fitzmaurice, to set up businesses in the new town of Winton in Western Queensland. They established the North Gregory Hotel and the Corfield & Fitzmaurice Store. When Fitzmaurice lost his sight in 1884 Corfield bought out his shares in the businesses, and then sold the hotel but retained the store in partnership with W.M. Campbell. In 1885 Cobb and Co established a depot in Winton with Corfield as their agent. After Campbell died, Corfield took on T. J. O'Rourke as his partner.

== Politics ==
At the 1888 elections, he was returned unopposed for the Legislative Assembly seat of Gregory in western Queensland in support of Thomas McIlwraith, a conservative, and held it at the 1893 and 1896 elections against a growing Labour vote. At a time when party politics were still fairly fluid in Queensland, he strongly advocated for the interests of his own electorate even when it conflicted with the conservative parliamentary bloc's policies. He opposed the 1891 strikes as a "revolution against the state", and was a consistent advocate of Federation. He was instrumental in establishing the Winton Branch Railway which connected Winton to Hughenden on the Great Northern Railway line to Townsville. He retired from politics in 1899.

== Later life ==
In 1921, Corfield published his memoirs "Reminiscences of Queensland, 1862–1899".

For the last several years of his life, Corfield lived in "Walmer", Yundah Street, Sandgate, Brisbane. Having been ailing for 18 months, Corfield died at his residence on 1 September 1927. He was buried in Toowong Cemetery.

== Legacy ==
The town of Corfield in Western Queensland was named after him.

The Corfield & Fitzmaurice Store continued to trade until 1987. It was listed on the Queensland Heritage Register on 21 October 1992. In 1994 it was reopened as Winton's visitor centre.

Parliament of Queensland
| Preceded by Thomas McWhannell | Member for Gregory; 1888–1899 | Succeeded by William Hamilton |
