= Bladensburg National Park =

National park in Queensland, Australia

- IUCN category II (national park)
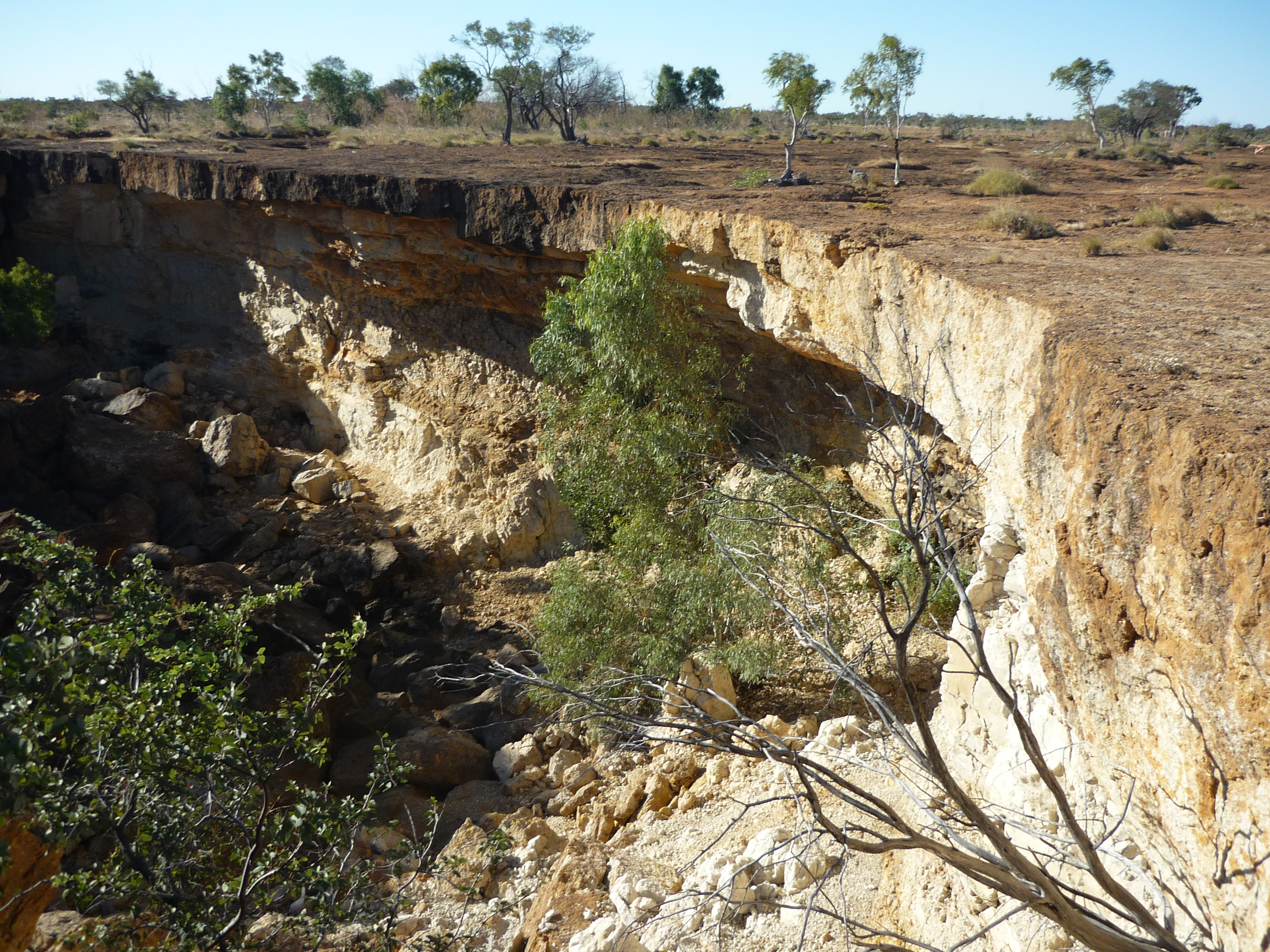
- Scrammy Gorge, 2011

- Location within Queensland
- Location: Queensland
- Nearest city: Winton
- Coordinates: 22°30′12″S 142°59′17″E
- Area: 849 km^{2} (328 sq mi)
- Established: 1984
- Governing body: Queensland Parks and Wildlife Service
- Website: derm.qld.gov.au/parks/bladensburg/index.html

Bladensburg is a national park in Shire of Winton, Queensland, Australia. It includes an area once occupied by a sheep station called Bladensburg Station.

== History ==
Bladensburg lies in the area of what was once Koa tribal territory and, on white settlement, was taken over to run a sheep station, known as Bladensburg Station. This was the site of the alleged Bladensburg massacre, in which around 200 Aboriginal people were killed in c.1872 at Skull Hole, on the head of Mistake Creek.

The 84,900 ha (210,000 acres) of national park were declared in 1984.

== Geography ==
The park is 1,152 km (716 mi) northwest of Brisbane, and just south of the town of Winton. The park features grassland plains, river flats, sandstone ranges and flat-topped mesas. The main watercourse in the park is the often dry Surprise Creek. During floods the creek becomes a braided channel.

The landscape to the south of the park has dissected tablelands with mesas and buttes and to the far south are flat sand plains.

== Description ==
The park is now a protected area containing areas of high biodiversity. It is situated predominantly in the Goneaway Tablelands subregion of the Channel Country bioregion, but also contains some of the Mitchell Grass Downs bioregion. The original Bladensburg homestead, which was probably transported to the site some time in the 1910s, houses the park's visitor information centre today. Birds common to the area include the painted firetail, rufous-crowned emu-wren and rufous-throated honeyeater.

== Attractions ==
The park contains dinosaur fossils as well as Aboriginal story places and ceremonial grounds.

Skull Hole, the site of the 1870s massacre of Aboriginal people, is preserved.

== Facilities ==
Access to the park is by 16 km of road from Winton. Camping is permitted beside Surprise Creek. No water is available.

== See also ==
- Protected areas of Queensland
