= Butch Lenton =

Australian councillor, community advocate and mayor of the Shire of Winton

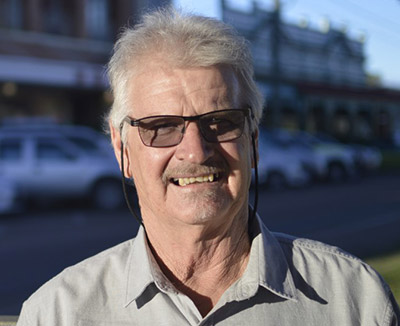

Mayor of the Shire of Winton
- In office 2012 – 1 October 2017

Personal details
- Born: Graham Thomas Lenton; 1956 Winton, Queensland, Australia
- Died: 1 October 2017 (aged 61) Winton, Queensland, Australia
- Spouse: Ros
- Children: 1
- Occupation: Councillor; community advocate

Graham Thomas "Butch" Lenton (1956 – 1 October 2017) was an Australian councillor and community advocate. As mayor of the Shire of Winton, he was known for his support and promotion of various tourism, renewable energy and film industry projects in Central West Queensland, particularly in the town of Winton. He was posthumously named as one of the Queensland Greats by Queensland Premier Annastacia Palaszczuk in a ceremony at the Queensland Art Gallery on 8 June 2018.

== Politics ==
Born in Winton in 1956, Lenton was elected as a councillor to Winton Shire Council in 1997, becoming deputy mayor in 2004 and then mayor in 2012. He narrowly missed out on becoming mayor in 2008 after gaining the same number of votes as his opponent Ed Warren. The tie was resolved by the drawing of one of their names from a hat, as legally required. The incident prompted the Queensland Opposition to demand an end to such "chook raffle" selection of mayors due to the importance of the position.

Community leaders have described how Lenton had a vision of Winton being an iconic tourist town and how he had been instrumental in instigating or promoting numerous tourist attractions and large scale community events in and around Winton.

Lenton is credited with securing the necessary funding to ensure the Waltzing Matilda Centre was quickly rebuilt after the original building was completely destroyed by fire in 2015. At the time of the fire, Lenton described the event as a "kick in the guts" but was keen to "tough it out". Lenton said the restoration of the tourist attraction had given the whole town a lift and hoped the new building would attract more tourists back to Winton. The new Waltzing Matilda Centre was opened by Australian Governor-General Peter Cosgrove in April 2018, almost seven months after Lenton's death in October 2017. Winton mayor Gavin Baskett described the new centre as a tribute to Lenton's vision.

Geothermal energy was introduced to Winton by Lenton who advocated for the construction of a $3.5 million geothermal plant in the town, believing it would assist the sustainability of small communities with significant savings to energy consumption. Following his death, Winton Chief Executive Officer Alan Rayment said the power plant would serve as a legacy for Lenton.

Believing it could bring a beneficial boost for the local economy, Lenton was a big supporter of the local film industry and spearheading events such as Winton's Vision Splendid Outback Film Festival and promoting the area as an ideal filming location. Lenton described the annual festival as a crucial element for the economic and cultural survival of outback Australian heritage. In 2016, Lenton revealed that Winton Shire Council had purchased a former motor garage to transform it into a film studio to be used by movie producers who shoot films locally.

Winton's inaugural Way Out West music festival, which was held seven months after his death, was instigated by Lenton. Singer Russell Morris dedicated his song "Wings of an Eagle" to Lenton at the festival.

Lenton was also heavily involved in rugby league, and was a life member of the Central West Rugby League Club and the Queensland Rugby League Central Division. He served two terms as president of the Central West Rugby League Club, his first term commencing in 1990 with his second term commencing in 2011.

== Death ==
Lenton died on 1 October 2017 in Winton, aged 61, having been diagnosed with cancer two years prior. He was survived by his wife, Ros, and their daughter, Carly Cox. Upon learning of Lenton's death, Queensland Premier Annastacia Palaszczuk asked her cabinet ministers to endorse a condolence motion to Lenton's family and to the people of Central West Queensland.

Among those who paid tribute to Lenton was actor and patron of Winton's Vision Splendid Outback Film Festival, Roy Billing. An array of dignitaries attended Lenton's funeral including Fiona Nash, Robbie Katter, David Littleproud and Mark Furner.

== Honours ==
In a statement, Palaszczuk announced that the road to the Age of Dinosaurs attraction near Winton would be renamed from Dinosaur Drive to Butch Lenton Way in Lenton's honour. The road was officially renamed by Minister for Transport and Main Roads Mark Bailey in July 2018.

Following Lenton's death, it was also announced that Peak Services had created the Butch Lenton Memorial Bush Council Innovation Award, consisting of an annual $10,000 bursary for a local council that had displayed innovation and drive.

In June 2018, Lenton was posthumously named as a Queensland Great. An extinct species of anhanguerid pterosaur, Ferrodraco lentoni or Lenton's iron dragon, was named after him in 2019.
