= Middleton, Queensland =

Middleton
- Town
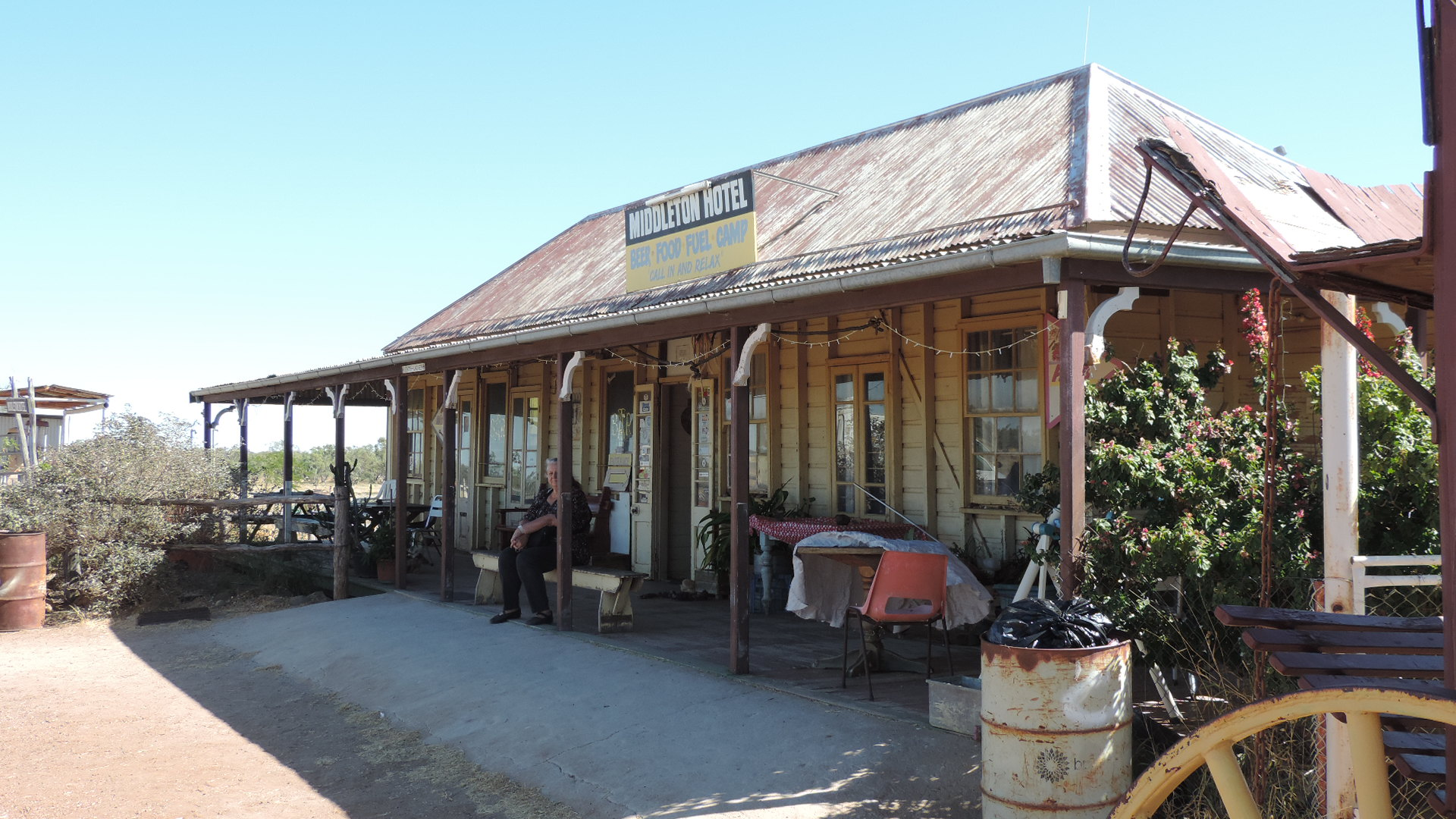
- Middleton Hotel, 2019

- Interactive map of Middleton
- Coordinates: 22.3499°S 141.5443°E
- Country: Australia
- State: Queensland
- LGA: Shire of Winton
- Location: 169 km (105 mi) W of Winton; 193 km (120 mi) ENE of Boulia; 441 km (274 mi) SE of Mount Isa; 768 km (477 mi) WSW of Townsville; 1,529 km (950 mi) NW of Brisbane

Government
  - State electorate: Gregory
  - Federal division: Maranoa

Area
  - Total: 18,744.9 km^{2} (7,237.4 sq mi)

Population
  - Total: 45 (2021 census)
  - Density: 0.002401/km^{2} (0.00622/sq mi)
- Time zone: UTC+10:00 (AEST)
- Postcode: 4735
Localities around Middleton
Selwyn	McKinlay	Kynuna
Warburton	Middleton	Corfield
Min Min	Diamantina Lakes	Opalton

Middleton is a rural locality in the Shire of Winton, Queensland, Australia. In the 2021 census, the locality of Middleton had a population of 45 people.

== Geography ==
The locality is on the Kennedy Developmental Road, 1,524 kilometres (947 mi) northwest of the state capital Brisbane and 435 kilometres (270 mi) southeast of the regional centre of Mount Isa.

Lying within the locality is the former site of Collingwood (22°19′58″S 142°32′6″E), a town that lost out in regional competition to its neighbour, Winton. It had been given up by about 1900.

The region in which Middleton lies is a circular zone that has been shown to be a crustal anomaly. Scientists from Geoscience Australia believe that it is an impact structure formed by an asteroid that struck the area about 300 million years ago. Final proof of this as the anomaly's genesis has not yet been found.

== History ==
European exploration of the Middleton area began with explorer John McKinlay's expedition in search of the missing Burke and Wills expedition in 1862. McKinlay named a watercourse in the area Middleton Creek after his second-in-charge Thomas Middleton.

The Middleton Hotel was established at the creek crossing as a Cobb & Co changing station on the route between Winton and Boulia.

Middleton Provisional School opened in 1908 and closed in 1913. Another Middleton Provisional School opened in 1937 and closed circa 1943.

Middleton Post Office opened by March 1916 (a receiving office had been open from 1889) and closed in 1968.

The 2016 film Goldstone was filmed in Middleton.

== Demographics ==
In the 2006 census, the locality of Middleton and the surrounding area had a population of 121 people.

In the 2016 census, the locality of Middleton had a population of 9 people.

In the 2021 census, the locality of Middleton had a population of 45 people.

== Heritage listings ==
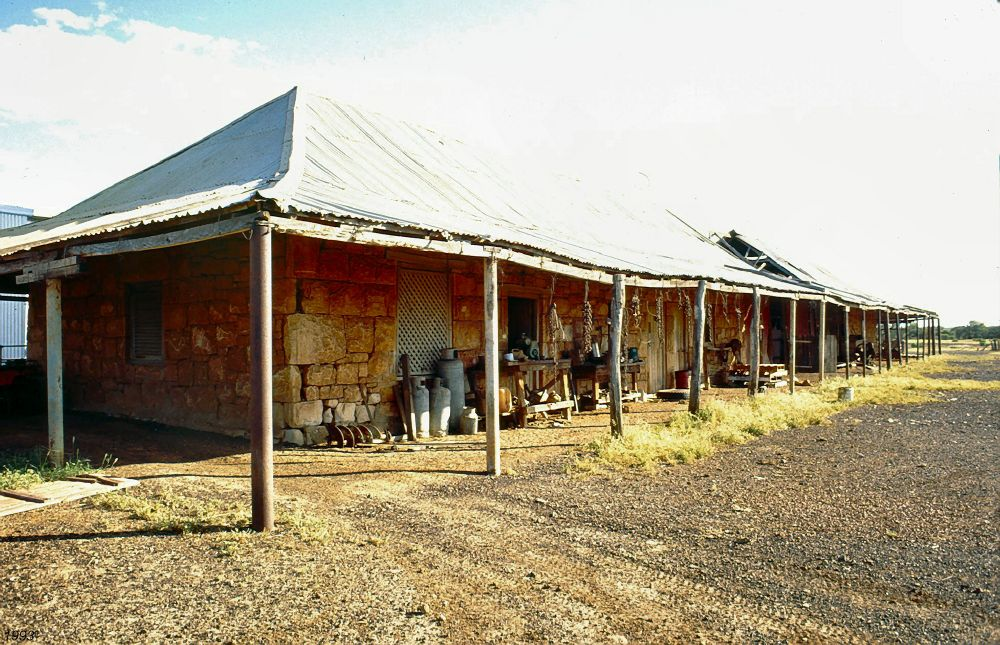
Elderslie Homestead, 1993

The Elderslie Homestead (22.3095°S 142.4380°E) on the Winton-Boulia Road is a heritage-listed site.

== Education ==
There are no schools in Middleton. The nearest primary and secondary school is Winton State School in Winton to the east, but is too distant for a daily commute. Distance education and boarding school are the alternatives.

== Facilities ==
The town has been mostly abandoned and now consists of the Middleton Hotel, campground and the disused hall.
