= Winton, Queensland =

Winton
- Town
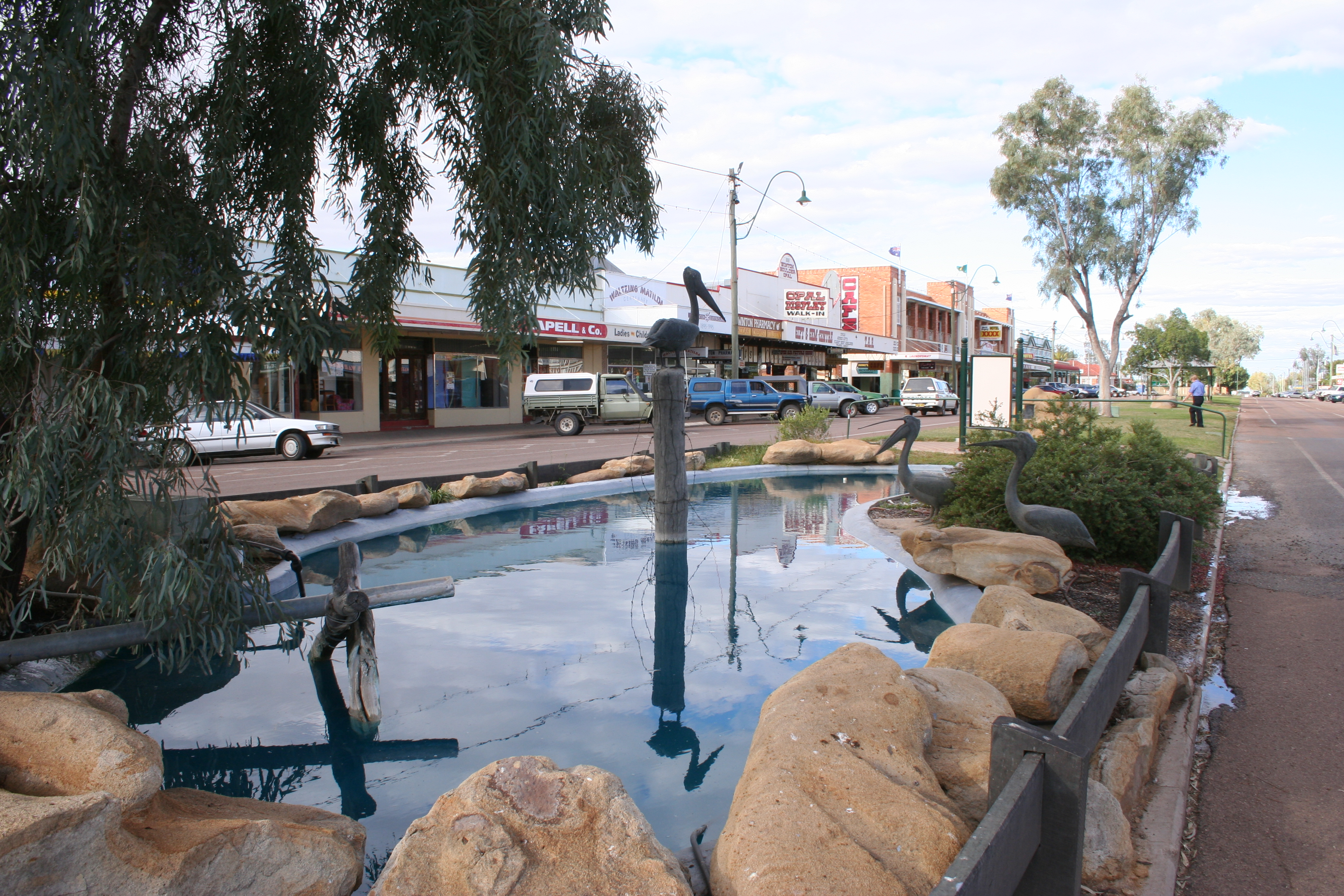
- Elderslie Street

- Interactive map of Winton
- Coordinates: 22.3913°S 143.0381°E
- Country: Australia
- State: Queensland
- LGA: Winton Shire
- Location: 441 km (274 mi) from Mount Isa; 1,153 km (716 mi) from Brisbane; 1,317 km (818 mi) from Alice Springs

Government
  - State electorate: Gregory
  - Federal division: Maranoa

Population
  - Total: 856 (2021 census)
- Postcode: 4735
- County: Ayrshire County, Queensland
- Mean max temp: 32.8 °C (91.0 °F)
- Mean min temp: 17.1 °C (62.8 °F)
- Annual rainfall: 352.8 mm (13.89 in)
Localities around Winton
Kynuna	Corfield	Corfield
Middleton	Winton	Muttaburra
Opalton	Opalton	Morella

Winton is an outback town and locality in the Shire of Winton in Central West Queensland, Australia. It is 177 kilometres (110 mi) northwest of Longreach. The main industries of the area are sheep and cattle raising. The town was named in 1876 by postmaster Robert Allen, after his place of birth, Winton, Dorset. Winton was the first home of the airline Qantas. In the 2021 census, the locality of Winton had a population of 856 people.

== Geography ==
Winton lies on the north bank of the Western River, a braided river that often runs dry, made of many small channels, a landform that gives this region, the Channel Country, its name. The Western is joined from the north by Jessamine Creek and Mill's Creek, both braided streams. Mistake Creek, likewise a braided stream, empties into the Western from the south. The Western itself flows westwards, eventually emptying into the Diamantina River at one of only three major confluences on that river. This lies some 60 km downstream. This puts Winton in the Lake Eyre basin. The land in the area is mostly flat grassland, which lends itself rather well to pastoral activity, an industry of some local importance to this day. Winton lies at the junction of the Kennedy Developmental Road and the Landsborough Highway, the two of which run concurrently from Winton's south end as far as another junction a few kilometres west of town.

=== Possible asteroid strike ===
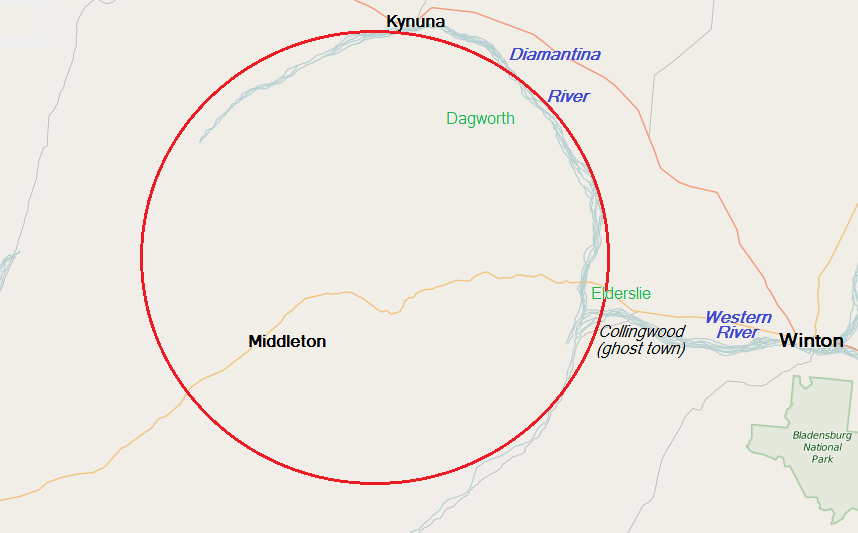
Map showing the rough extent of the crustal anomaly west of Winton that may be an ancient impact structure

The Diamantina River's hook-shaped upper reaches have drawn scientific attention. In March 2015, Geoscience Australia reported that the river's course at and near its headwaters flows along the edge of a roughly circular crustal anomaly that might well be an impact structure. It is an area, as described by Richard Blewett, a senior official with Geoscience Australia, 130 kilometres (81 mi) in diameter, characterized by geomagnetic anomalies, and Winton lies roughly 60 km beyond its eastern edge. The Sydney Morning Herald reported that recent seismic studies undertaken there indicated that long ago an asteroid or comet struck the area releasing energy equivalent to 650 million Hiroshima A-bombs (and thus roughly 41 zettajoules). The asteroid impact has not yet been confirmed, but this could be done with core samples from the ground in the central ring structure to a depth of hundreds of metres. The impact, if indeed this is the explanation for the anomaly, would have happened roughly 300 million years ago.

=== Dinosaurs ===
The area surrounding the town has yielded a number of dinosaur fossils. In 2009, the discoveries near the town of three Early Cretaceous dinosaur genera, Australovenator, Wintonotitan and Diamantinasaurus, were announced. Australovenator wintonensis, the type specimen of that genus, is named after the town. The specimens were unearthed at the "Matilda site" not far northwest of town, on Elderslie Station (site's position roughly 22.2°S 142.5°E), and at the "Triangle Paddock Site" right nearby. Another sauropod, Savannasaurus, was also found in this area, along with the as-of-yet unnamed "Elliot". The town also lent its name to the geological formation in which the fossils were found, the Winton Formation.

=== Great Artesian Basin ===
Winton is situated on the Great Artesian Basin and draws its water for use in the town. This water emerges at 83 to 86 °C (181 to 187 °F) and is cooled in ponds in Corfield to 44 °C (111 °F) before it is circulated through the town. Sulphur gas gives the water an 'eggy' smell.

As of 2018, Winton Shire Council is developing a geothermal power plant to replacing the water cooling process with one that converts the released heat into electricity. It is expected to generate 2000 megawatt hours per year.

=== Street names ===
The main streets in the town of Winton were named after the stations lying in the directions in which the streets were running. For instance, east and west — Elderslie, Vindex, Cork and Dagworth. Those facing the north were called Oondooroo, Manuka, Sesbania and Werna. Three of these stations, Dagworth, Vindex and Oondooroo, figure in the Waltzing Matilda story.

=== Climate ===
Winton experiences a hot semi-arid climate (Köppen: BSh); with very hot, moderately humid summers and mild, dry winters with warm days and cool nights. Average maxima remain warm to hot year-round: from 24.4 °C (75.9 °F) in July to 38.2 °C (100.8 °F) in December; but temperatures can exceed 30 °C (86 °F) in any month. Average annual rainfall, concentrated in the summer is low: 415.3 mm (16.35 in). Rain occurs on an average of 31.5 days, and like much of inland Queensland, is highly variable due to ENSO. The town is very sunny, averaging 191.8 clear days and only 58.6 cloudy days annually. Extreme temperatures have ranged from −1.7 °C (28.9 °F) on 28 June 1908 and 25 July 1968, to 46.8 °C (116.2 °F) on 1 December 2006.

Climate data for Winton (22º23'24"S, 143º02'24"E, 182 m AMSL) (1938–2012, extremes 1957–2012, rainfall to 1884)
Month	Jan	Feb	Mar	Apr	May	Jun	Jul	Aug	Sep	Oct	Nov	Dec	Year
Record high °C (°F)	45.6 (114.1)	45.0 (113.0)	43.3 (109.9)	39.6 (103.3)	36.8 (98.2)	33.9 (93.0)	34.6 (94.3)	37.2 (99.0)	40.2 (104.4)	44.5 (112.1)	45.4 (113.7)	46.8 (116.2)	46.8 (116.2)
Mean daily maximum °C (°F)	37.5 (99.5)	36.2 (97.2)	35.0 (95.0)	32.1 (89.8)	27.7 (81.9)	24.6 (76.3)	24.4 (75.9)	26.9 (80.4)	31.0 (87.8)	34.7 (94.5)	37.0 (98.6)	38.2 (100.8)	32.1 (89.8)
Mean daily minimum °C (°F)	23.5 (74.3)	22.9 (73.2)	21.0 (69.8)	17.2 (63.0)	12.9 (55.2)	9.4 (48.9)	8.2 (46.8)	9.5 (49.1)	13.4 (56.1)	17.8 (64.0)	20.9 (69.6)	22.8 (73.0)	16.6 (61.9)
Record low °C (°F)	12.8 (55.0)	11.7 (53.1)	10.9 (51.6)	7.8 (46.0)	1.7 (35.1)	−1.7 (28.9)	−1.7 (28.9)	−1.1 (30.0)	1.1 (34.0)	5.6 (42.1)	7.5 (45.5)	13.9 (57.0)	−1.7 (28.9)
Average precipitation mm (inches)	83.2 (3.28)	87.0 (3.43)	53.8 (2.12)	22.3 (0.88)	20.2 (0.80)	18.2 (0.72)	14.7 (0.58)	6.5 (0.26)	9.0 (0.35)	18.1 (0.71)	31.8 (1.25)	49.9 (1.96)	415.3 (16.35)
Average precipitation days (≥ 1.0 mm)	5.6	5.3	3.5	1.8	1.5	1.4	1.2	0.8	1.2	2.1	3.0	4.1	31.5
Average afternoon relative humidity (%)	33	37	33	30	33	33	30	24	20	21	21	25	28
Average dew point °C (°F)	14.9 (58.8)	16.0 (60.8)	13.4 (56.1)	10.4 (50.7)	8.0 (46.4)	5.4 (41.7)	3.2 (37.8)	2.1 (35.8)	2.8 (37.0)	5.2 (41.4)	7.9 (46.2)	11.0 (51.8)	8.4 (47.0)
Source: Bureau of Meteorology (1938–2012 normals, extremes 1957–2012 and rainfall to 1884)

== History ==
=== Traditional owners ===
The traditional owners of the Winton area, the Koa people, consider Bladensburg National Park area (near Winton) to be a special part of their traditional country, and the park is also important to the Maiawali and Karuwali people.

Jirandali (also known as Yirandali, Warungu, Yirandhali) is an Australian Aboriginal language of North-West Queensland, particularly the Hughenden area. The language region includes the local government area of the Shire of Flinders, including Dutton River, Flinders River, Mount Sturgeon, Caledonia, Richmond, Corfield, Winton, Torrens, Tower Hill, Landsborough Creek, Lammermoor Station, Hughenden, and Tangorin.

Skull Hole, on Surprise Creek, at Bladensburg Station about 15 kilometres (9.3 mi) from Winton, was the site of a massacre of Aboriginal people in 1877.

The Koa people have lodged an application to the Federal Court of Australia to have their native title legally recognised. This application (or "claim") was registered on 28 September 2015, by the National Native Title Tribunal. On 6 October 2021 the Federal Court recognised the Koa people as native title holders of land and waters covering 31,400 square kilometres.

=== Early exploration ===
In one of Australia's greatest mysteries, the Prussian explorer Ludwig Leichhardt set off on an expedition with a group of men and animals from the Condamine River in the Darling Downs, bound for the Swan River Colony across the continent. He was last seen on 3 April 1848 at McPherson's Station, Coogoon, still on the Darling Downs. His whereabouts thereafter have never been known, but he and his men are believed to have met their end in the Great Sandy Desert. This expedition may have brought Leichhardt near Winton's future site.

William Landsborough undertook extensive exploration of both the Western and Diamantina rivers in the 1860s, and it seems likely that he might have found himself at Winton's future site at least once, for it lies on the former. In 1866, Landsborough led another expedition up the Diamantina, which would have taken him to within 60 km of the actual site, albeit not right to it.

The first European settlers in the area came in 1866, but many did not stay very long because a drought struck within a few years. The town's true birth came with a sequence of events, both natural and manmade, which gave rise to one new town in Central West Queensland, but also sowed the seeds for another's failure.

=== Winton's founding and early days ===
Robert Allen, a former police sergeant, left Aramac about 1875 and moved west to the Pelican Waterholes (about 1,600 metres (0.99 mi) west of the town's current site), where he set up a shop and a public house the next year. The heavy rains that same year, however, brought Allen a great deal of woe, and he even "was compelled by floods to remain two days on the wall-plate of his building." When the flooding had abated somewhat, Allen shifted what was left of his business to Winton's current site. Robert Allen is thus held to be the town's founder.

Winton's entrenchment as this pioneering region's business hub was secured only by a quirk of fate, as William Henry Corfield's written record makes clear. He and some acquaintances set out to do business in an Outback town that had been surveyed and laid out by the Queensland colonial government, only to decide upon arrival in the district that it would be a better idea to found a town somewhat further east near the Pelican Waterholes, which was to become Winton. William Henry Corfield (1843–1927), later the mayor of Winton, had returned to Queensland in 1878 after suffering a bout of malaria, and wrote of his experiences as a pioneer in Central West Queensland in his book Reminiscences of Queensland 1862–1899, published in 1921:

Passing through Townsville, I met [Robert] Fitzmaurice, who told me that carrying had fallen away between Cooktown and the Palmer, and that he had left that district. He suggested that I should join with him in carrying to the western country, and added that he had been informed by a squatter that there was a good opening for a store at the Conn Waterhole, on the Diamantina River. This is about forty miles [60 km] down the Western River from where Winton now is.

The Conn Waterhole to which Corfield referred is a body of water some 55 kilometres (34 mi) down the Western River from Winton. It is the northernmost permanent waterhole in the Diamantina basin, and maps still identify it by that name today. Corfield made it clear where he meant to settle:

Our destination was Collingwood, more widely known as the Conn Waterhole, where the Government Surveyor had laid out a township situated about 40 miles [64 km] west of Winton.

Another man of Corfield's acquaintance, named Thomas Lynett, had left Townsville for the same destination with backing from Burns, Philp and Co. to set up a shop at Collingwood, if he deemed the newly laid out town to be suitable upon his inspection. Apparently, though, he did not, deciding that the land there was too prone to flooding. He turned back, and eventually, he, Corfield, Fitzmaurice and Robert Allen, who was already at the more easterly site, agreed to establish a centre east of Corfield's original destination of Collingwood. This was Winton's beginning. Collingwood, however, whose site was the government's choice, never truly took root, and by 1900, it was a ghost town.

At the Winton site, Corfield, Fitzmaurice, Lynett and Allen then discussed moving Allen's building northwards somewhat, back from the Western River on higher ground. Corfield wrote about the outcome:

We offered to do the work without cost, but Allen and Lynett decided to remain where they were. We had to accept the position, and agreed to build in line with the others.

This formed the base upon which Mr. Surveyor Jopp laid out the township afterwards.

"Mr. Surveyor Jopp" was George Keith Jopp, a surveyor based in Blackall. His name was to be found on the "List of Surveyors licensed to act under the provisions and for the purposes of 'The Real Property Acts of 1861 and 1877'", which was published in Wright's Australian and American Commercial Directory and Gazetteer in 1881. Corfield's book also tells the locally well known story of how Winton got its current name:

The original name for the town – now known as Winton – was Pelican Water-holes. Bob Allen, the first resident, whom I have mentioned, acted as post-master. The mail service was a fortnightly one, going west to Wokingham Creek, thence via Sesbania to Hughenden. There was no date stamp supplied to the office, but by writing "Pelican Water-holes" and the date across the stamps, the post mark was made, and the stamps cancelled. This was found to be very slow and unsatisfactory.

Allen was asked to propose a name, and he suggested that the P.O. should be called "Winton." This is the name of a suburb of Bournemouth, Hampshire, England, and Allen's native place.

Even though Bournemouth is nowadays generally held to be in Dorset, Corfield did not quite get the county wrong. Bournemouth is actually in the ceremonial county of Dorset, but Corfield named the historic county of Hampshire, which also includes Bournemouth. It is clear, however, that Corfield correctly identified Allen's birthplace.

Business in those earliest days of the town's existence was hindered by the lack of a local bank. The nearest one was in Aramac, some 400 kilometres (250 mi) away. There was also a drought then. Building materials had to be brought in from even farther away, for there was not a great deal of wood to be had in the Channel Country. Corfield travelled all the way to Townsville on Queensland's east coast to fetch them in. Law enforcement was also as non-existent as one might expect it to be in an early town in Central West Queensland. Corfield described that problem, too:

At this time Winton was the rendezvous of some of the worst characters of the west; fights were frequent on the then unformed streets.

The rowdies threatened to take the grog in the store, and as there were no police nearer than Aramac, I deemed it best to dispose of all the liquor to Allen, the local publican, who jumped at the chance to obtain a supply.

A few residents formed themselves into a vigilance committee.

The late Mr. J. A. Macartney passed through to visit his property, Bladensburg Station, and seeing how things were, wrote to the Home Secretary asking for police protection.

He also described another problem – drug abuse:

When I returned Winton was entirely out of liquor, and Allen did a great business in selling bottles of painkiller as a substitute. It was laughable to see men take a bottle out of their pocket, saying, "Have a nip, mate, it's only five shillings a bottle?"

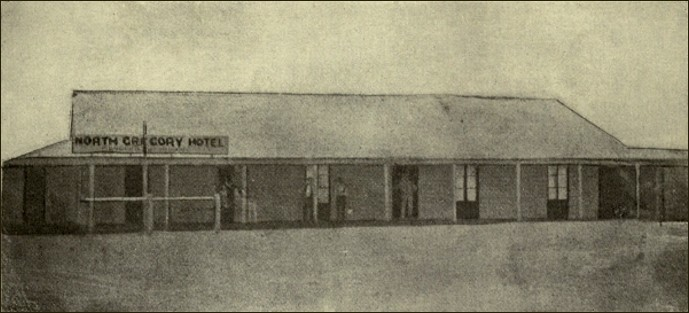
The North Gregory Hotel in Winton as it looked in 1879

Winton was gazetted as a township on 12 July 1879, describing it as 2 square miles (5.2 km^{2}) resumed from the Doveridge No. 4 and Vindex No. 1 North runs.

The North Gregory Hotel was established in 1879. In 1899 it burnt down for the first time, but a new North Gregory Hotel was up and running by the following year.

In 1879, Julius von Berger, who had fled Schleswig-Holstein to escape Prussian rule, became the town's first dispensing chemist (pharmacist).

In 1880, Sub-Inspector Fred Murray and Sergeant Feltham came to town from Blackall and set up Winton's first police station in a small rented building. Their equipment was rather primitive, though, and they had to make do with a hefty log and a chain as a police lockup. This was not always good enough:

One day Feltham went down to the store, leaving a prisoner chained up. Shortly afterwards he was surprised when he saw his prisoner (who was a very powerful man) marching into the public house carrying the log on his shoulder, and call for drinks. It took three men to get him back to the lock-up.

Cobb & Co's stagecoaches were serving Winton by 1880 after having bought up a number of mail routes in Queensland. Robert Arthur Johnstone also arrived in Winton in 1880 to become the town's first police magistrate. He had been in the Australian native police and had been an associate of George Elphinstone Dalrymple in the latter's exploratory work. In 1880 Johnstone also conducted the first sale of government land, one result of which was the acquisition of Thomas Lynett's property by the Queensland National Bank, thus giving Winton its first bank. The bank began business right away in Lynett's old coffee room, and pulled down his building to make way for something that would be more suitable for a bank. A man named Morgan started a blacksmith's shop in Winton after having worked at Ayrshire Downs Station.

In 1881, Thomas McIlwraith, who was then Premier of Queensland and who would be knighted the following year, passed through Winton. His destination was Ayrshire Downs. Nevertheless, the town's whole population turned out, at night, at a waterhole almost 10 kilometres (6.2 mi) from town to meet him and his wife.

In 1882, a visiting clergyman, the first of any denomination, visited Winton. On the Sunday while he was in town, he held a church service in the billiard room at the hotel, after a blue blanket had been thrown over the pool table and a red one had been draped over the cue rack. William Corfield himself was later chosen to present the clergyman with remuneration in the form of "a purse of sovereigns". This presentation did not go off without incident, however. One local squatter caused himself quite a bit of pain – and the other men at the presentation quite a bit of laughter – when, during a prayer upon presentation of the gift, he knelt down in prayer only to wound his rear end with his own long-necked spurs. The clergyman, however, simply carried on with his prayer of thanks.

In 1883, Winton's first district court was opened when Judge Miller and Crown Prosecutor Real came to town. By about this time, there was also a doctor in town, who sometimes had to deal with typhoid fever patients. Tenders were sought for building a hospital in Winton late in 1882. It seems, however, that the doctor tendered his resignation only three years later. A correspondent reported not long thereafter "Doctor Van Someron is to be our new surgeon, and I trust that we shall be able to keep him longer with us than his predecessors." This suggests that Winton was not considered a choice location in the 1880s, at least not among those of the medical profession.

By 1883, Winton was developing into a proper town with economic activity that was of benefit to all the settlers, both urban and rural, in the region. This would have struck most at the time as a great boon, but in William Corfield's wry assessment of Winton's progress:

"Now that we had two banks, four hotels, a chemist, saddler, besides other branches of industry, we felt that we were being drawn perilously within the influences of civilisation and its drawbacks."

By 1884, Winton and much of the surrounding area were in the grip of a serious drought that brought many people hardship. It had, however, ended by 1886. By this time, Winton had a weekly newspaper, the Winton Herald. It was owned by D. H. Maxwell, who had founded it in 1885 after coming from Aramac. Maxwell later died in an angling accident near Winton in 1894. He was found drowned 12 miles [19 km] from town.

A school was being discussed in Winton by a school committee in 1885. Winton State School opened on 10 August 1885, despite the correspondent's misgivings about the bureaucracy involved.

Pugh's Queensland Almanac, Law Calendar, Directory, and Coast Guide for 1885 listed Winton's local professionals, including Julius von Berger, who was now joined by another pharmacist named A. Hurworth. The hospital's surgeon (also described in the almanac as the "Medical Man") was Dr. Wilson. The name Morgan by this time no longer figured among the town's blacksmiths ("J. Long, Ryan & Jensen"). T. B. Feltham had two mentions in the almanac for being both the bookseller-stationer and the tobacconist, and likewise founding townsman Thomas Lynett was listed twice for being both a shopkeeper and the innkeeper at the Royal Mail Hotel. The North Gregory Hotel was run by William Brown Steele by this time. He had bought it from William Henry Corfield after Corfield had bought his partner Robert Fitzmaurice's share of that business out after Fitzmaurice had returned from a six-month trip to Sydney to see about his failing eyesight. The prognosis was not good – Fitzmaurice was almost blind when he returned to Winton – and so he decided to sell up and leave town. Corfield, though, had no great interest in running a hotel and so sought out a buyer, and this turned out to be Steele.

In 1886, luxuriant grass growth furnished fodder not only for livestock, but annoyingly also for wildfires. Several nearby stations were stricken, among them Vindex, Elderslie and Ayrshire Downs. Plans were being made to build a Catholic church in 1888. Against this was the state in which the Church of England in Winton then found itself. By 1890, its services were still being held in an all-purpose hall whose owner, William Steele, had the licence for it revoked that year, which was understandably an unwelcome hardship for the town's Anglicans.

In 1889, work was in progress on Winton's first artesian bore. By mid-August, it had reached a depth of about 430 feet (or 131 m). Tenders were called that same year for another bank, this time the Bank of New South Wales. The same article mentioned that founding townsman Thomas Lynett had had to pay a fine of £1, along with 9s in costs (after having been summoned before the Police Magistrate), for a breach of the Licensing Act.

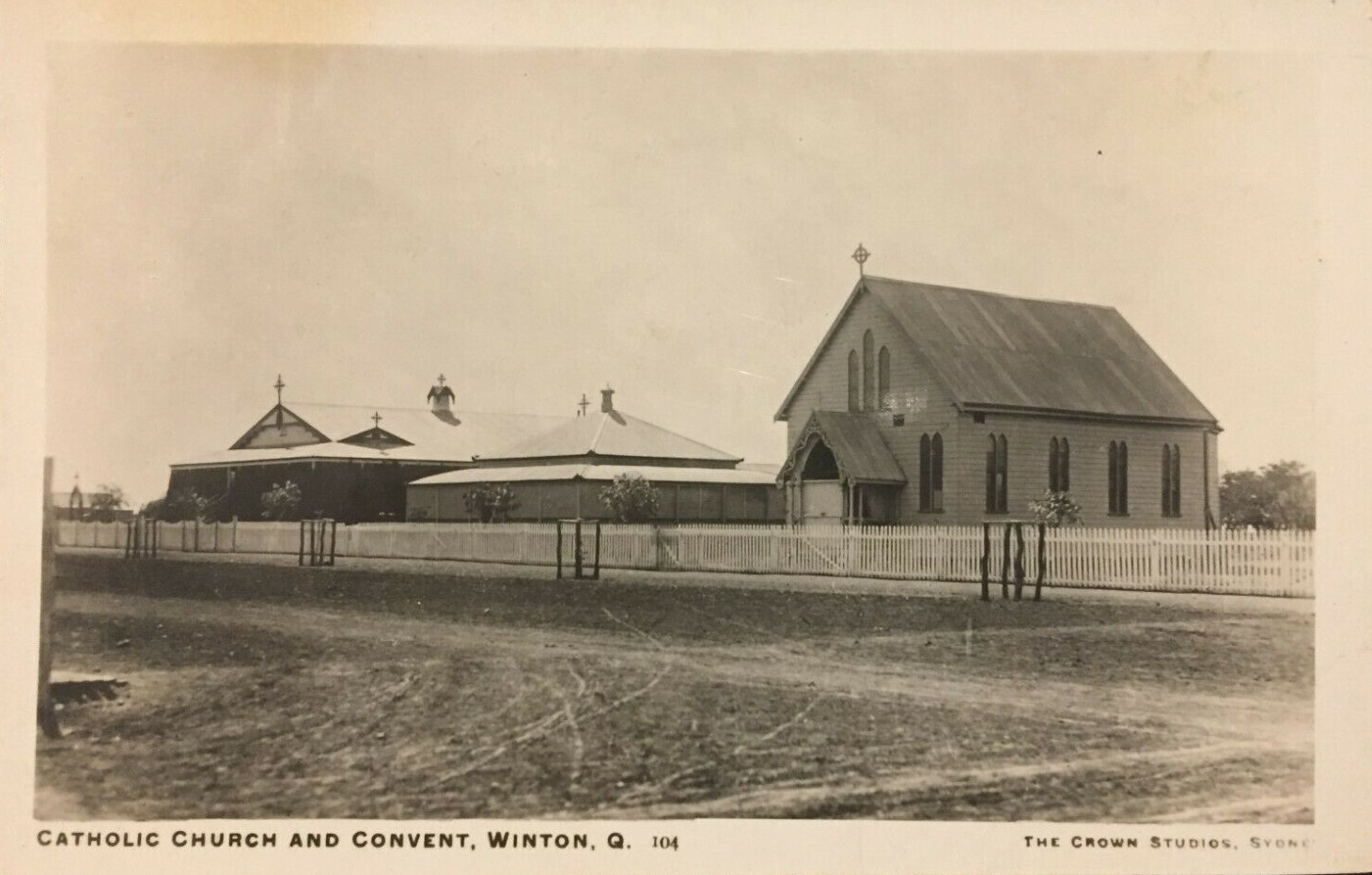
Catholic Church and Convent, early 1900s

St Patrick's Catholic Church was built in 1887. The timber church was designed by Rooney Brothers.

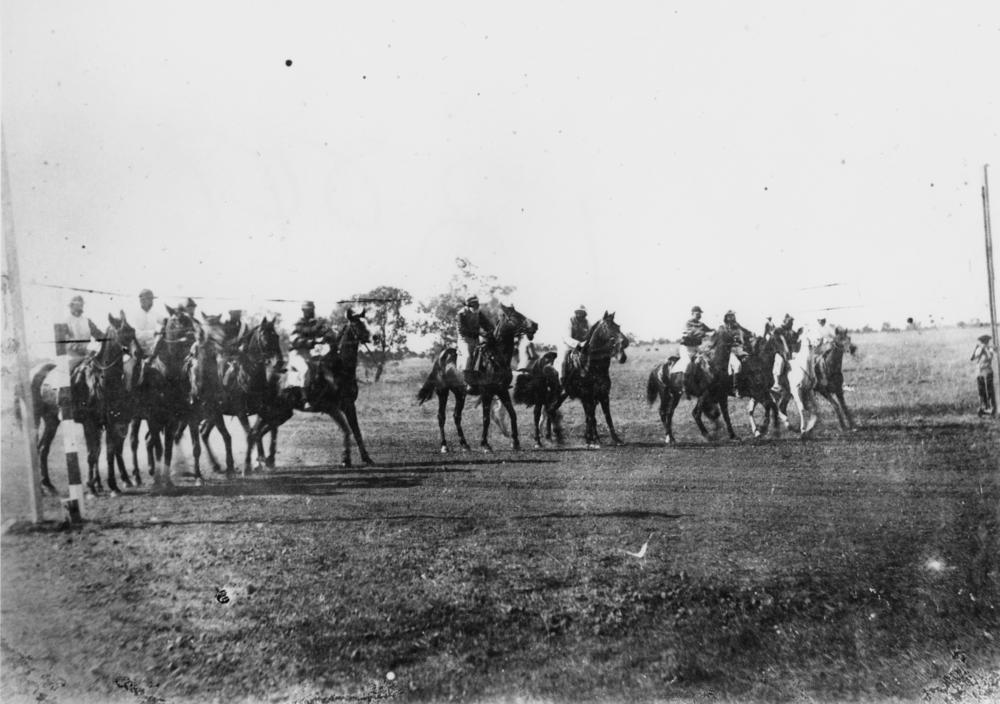
At the races in Winton, Queensland, ca. 1890

In 1890, a local correspondent sang the praises of Winton's hospital and was clearly pleased at the staff there. "Winton is at last blessed with a good doctor", he declared.

=== Industrial unrest ===
It was also in 1890 that trouble was brewing in Winton, and indeed in other parts of Australia. One report mentioned a robbery in which one man was relieved of £30 while the police seemed unable to catch the thief, and the correspondent commented "This game has been going on here for a very long time", perhaps meaning to suggest police complicity in this and other crimes. More seriously, even though there was no real loss, was this incident, mentioned in the same report:

Somebody amused himself at the expense of the senior-constable of police, telling him that the shearers and all union men would rush the town. The senior-constable rushed away in hot haste to the barracks, and ordered the police to get Martinis and revolvers in good going order, so as to shoot the unionists down.

The tensions between the shearers and their employers would soon come to a head, and this incident showed just how tense the situation had already become in Winton. Meanwhile, there was Ashton's Circus to enjoy. It came to this far-flung town in September 1890 and besides its regular performances, also did a benefit for the local hospital.

The Great Shearers' Strike came in 1891, disrupting the wool industry for a while. Locally, work stoppages began very early that year. On 6 January 1891, a small item – the quotation below is the article's full text – in The Australian Star (Sydney) announced the onset of management-labour troubles in the Winton area:

The station hands have left Vindex and Oondooroo stations in the Winton districts in consequence of the new wages tariff formulated by the Pastoral Employers' Association.

Vindex lies not far east-southeast of Winton, and Oondooroo not far north. One of the "momentous decisions by the Federated Pastoralists" (the management side in the strike) on 18 March 1891 was to declare a great number of stations in the Winton area "non-union", including Elderslie west of town, and also Ayrshire Downs on Wokingham Creek, Dagworth on the Diamantina River, Warnambool Downs south-southwest of town and Llanrheidol north of Middleton, about 150 km west of Winton. "This means that no loading consigned to those stations during this week will be allowed to be forwarded by union teams", the article asserted. Later, on nearby Elderslie Station, which belonged to absentee landlord Sir Samuel Wilson at the time, the woolshed was burnt down on 8 October that year.

A major sticking point in the 1891 strike throughout Queensland, and locally in Winton, was the issue of "freedom of contract". This would have empowered both pastoralists and the shearers whom they employed to enter into contractual employment arrangements free of any union involvement therein. This clearly did not sit well with the striking, unionized shearers. Polls held in striker camps throughout the colony yielded results that were heavily – sometimes unanimously – in favour of rejecting any such arrangement. The camp at Winton wired in to the union headquarters at Barcaldine not only the results of their poll, but also the comment "our decision is to fight to the last."

Nevertheless, the strikers eventually lost the battle by May 1891. However, management-labour troubles were soon to flare up again.

In 1894, Winton once again found itself in the middle of a hotbed of discontent as the Second Shearers' Strike wore on. There were unfortunate incidents in the Winton area. At nearby Elderslie Station, a great haystack was set ablaze, while over at Dagworth Station, the shearing shed was burnt down by strikers armed with guns. Another woolshed was set afire at Manuka, about halfway between Winton and Hughenden. A map at the same source shows the "Scene of Recent Outrages" (the strikers did not have the press on their side), with Winton clearly marked. As in the last great strike, Winton hosted a strikers' camp, and its occupants were as adamant as before. After discussing "the telegram from Longreach declaring the strike off in that district", the men apparently expressed "a determination to continue the fight to the bitter end."

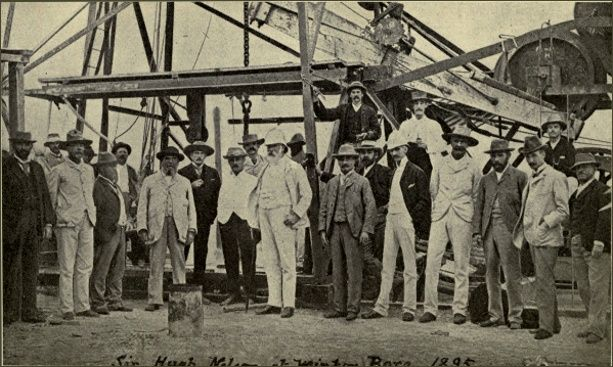
Sir Hugh Nelson (centre, in white), then the Premier of Queensland, visited Winton in 1895. Here he is seen at the town's artesian bore.

The next year – on 6 April 1895 to be precise – Sir Herbert Ramsay gave "Waltzing Matilda" its first public recital at the North Gregory Hotel in Winton. It was also in 1895 that Premier Sir Hugh Nelson visited Winton. William Henry Corfield, by now the Member of the Queensland Legislative Assembly for Gregory, accompanied the premier's party on the Winton stretch of his tour. A deputation at Winton was most anxious to let the premier know that a railway link with Hughenden was uppermost in the townsfolk's minds, and Mr. Corfield also presented Sir Hugh with a petition, signed by 376 constituents, asking "that a permanent survey of the line from Hughenden to Winton be made with a view of connecting the town with its natural port, Townsville."

Despite frequent complaints in 19th-century Winton about the dearth of water, an 1895 article mentions that gardeners were growing peaches, grapes and melons in town. Perhaps coincidentally, a famous botanist passed through Winton that year, Frederick Manson Bailey.

Drought was indeed a serious problem in the region at various times, one that might have destroyed Winton, had one drought in 1895 been as dire an emergency as one geologist believed. Robert Logan Jack, FGS, FRGS, a Government Geologist for Queensland, wrote in that year of an eventuality in his Geological Survey, Bulletin no. 1, Artesian Water in the Western Interior of Queensland, that might have had not only this effect, but also the effect of saving the doomed town of Collingwood from what would turn out to be its actual fate. The drought striking the region had seriously depleted the waterhole on Mistake Creek, upon which Winton wholly depended for its water, leaving, Jack reckoned, only three weeks' to a month's supply of water for the town. He foresaw that it might become necessary to move Winton's whole population, along with their livestock, to the Conn Waterhole at Collingwood, 55 km to the west. This, however, never came about. Moreover, Winton's artesian bore was finally completed the next year, ending dependency on the climatic vagaries to which the region is subject, but only after two boring companies had been bankrupted by the project.

The Winton branch railway from Hughenden reached Winton in 1899 (which was likely the last nail in Collingwood's coffin).

Winton's artesian bore water was being piped from the wellhead in 1902, with water welling up from a depth of 4,010 feet (1 222 m) at the rate of 650,000 imperial gallons (roughly 3 000 000 L) daily. In 1899 and 1900, the town, and indeed the whole region, were suffering under a devastating drought. A correspondent, writing in January 1900 – midsummer – described horrendous conditions on the surrounding stations, some of which were deserted for want of water, others empty of livestock because their owners had had the animals sent out, and yet others that were heaped with dead livestock that had died of thirst. The animals in town were visibly suffering, too. "I could mention many more drought incidents", the correspondent said, "but it is sickening to write of them." The correspondent further wrote of the progress of artesian bores at the surrounding stations in some detail, summing it up with the possibly punning remark "This about completes the boring news for the week." There was a slight respite by July – midwinter – which even saw some livestock sent back to their stations. However, the drought persisted throughout 1900 and affected most of Queensland, with a reporter in Maryborough noting on 29 December that year – well into the next summer – that it "in most places has been the worst experienced in the last 25 years." He also said, "The closing days of the year, however, have refreshed the parched lands with welcome rains and inspired the hope that the drought is at last broken up, and that a genial season is awaiting us in the new year."

The town's Anglicans celebrated the opening of Saint Paul's Church on 4 February 1900.

Even before the end of the 19th century, the town's ethnic makeup consisted of more than members of groups from the British Isles. Besides the chemist from Schleswig-Holstein, Julius von Berger, there were people of Chinese origin in Winton, too. In 1896, a firm called Sun Kum Wah in Winton run by three Chinese men, Low Sow, Ah Shew and Sun Kum Fung, placed a notice in Queensland newspapers announcing the dissolution of this three-way partnership, and the apparent formation of a new, two-way one, without Sun Kum Fung. The company, however, kept its former name for at least ten more years, for the building in the flood photograph below is its place of business, with the name painted on the façade. In Robert Logan Jack's and Robert Etheridge's Geology and Palæontology of Queensland and New Guinea, a further reference is made to a Winton man named G. Cramieri, suggesting that there might have been at least one Italian family in Winton in 1892, when the book was published. Mr. Cramieri is mentioned alongside Julius von Berger (who apparently took an interest in palaeontology when he was not working as a pharmacist) as a contributor of fossils whose provenance Jack and Etheridge wished to acknowledge.

=== Early 20th century ===
The Federation of Australia occurred on 1 January 1901.

St Patrick's Catholic School was opened in 1906 by the Sisters of Mercy. Initially the school was conducted inside the wooden church until a separate school building was built in 1911. In 1960 a new school was built and the convent was used to accommodate boarding students. The school came under lay leadership in 1985 with the appointment of Glen Perkins.

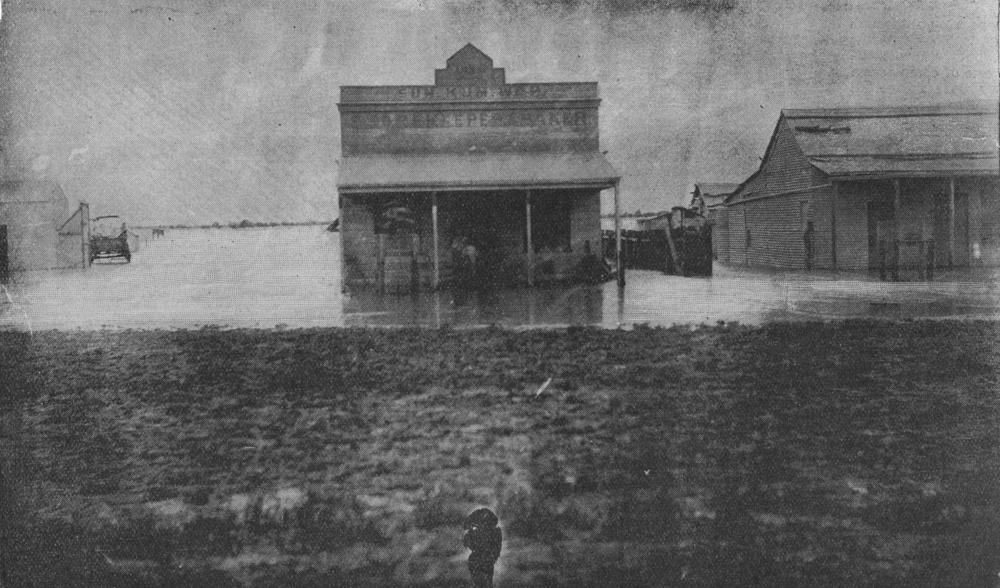
The flooding in Winton in 1906 broke records.

Quite at odds with the usual weather complaint was what happened in Winton in 1906, for the problem then was not a dearth of rain, but a definite oversupply. In March of that year, a mailman returning to Longreach from Winton reported "very heavy rain" that week. The rainfall in the area between those two places in the first two months of 1906 was reckoned to be between 14 and 18 inches (roughly 356 to 457 mm) with consequent overflowing seen in the area's creeks and rivers. The Western was far from an exception to this, and the photograph at right shows what became of some of the town's buildings.

In 1909, the telephone reached Winton and by October, it had 34 subscribers. By May 1911, improvements were being made to the post office to set the telephone exchange apart in its own section because it was becoming a "large and important branch". Indeed, there were then also plans to expand the exchange with the addition of a further switchboard to handle an expected 50 more subscribers.

Winton Methodist Church opened circa March 1912. It was built from timber at a cost of £540 and could seat 160 people. Later the building was used by the Winton Christian Fellowship.

On Sunday 16 August 1914, Winton's townsfolk met at the Shire Hall to form a patriotic committee to recruit volunteers for the military to go and fight in the First World War, which had broken out less than three weeks earlier. Five hundred and eighteen men and women from Winton and the surrounding district served in that war, and their fallen comrades' names can now be found on Winton's war memorial on Vindex Street, outside the Shire Hall. Winton's contribution of personnel to the war effort was proportionally one of Australia's highest, and 101 of its townsmen fell in the Great War, including a farmhand from nearby Bladensburg Station named Colin Morgan-Reade, who fell at Gallipoli on 30 May 1915. His story served as a focus during Winton's observance of the centenary of that campaign in 2015.

In 1916, the North Gregory Hotel burnt down for the second time.

=== Between the World Wars ===
In 1918, the Royal opened, and is still in business today. It is an outdoor cinema, one of only a few left in Australia.

Qantas, now the flag carrier airline of Australia, was founded in Winton in 1920. Alan Joyce, then CEO of Qantas, cutting a tape to open a monument to that initial event, April 2021.

In 1920, a new company was founded, Queensland and Northern Territory Aerial Services Limited (now known as Qantas Airways), and for a while, it was headquartered in Winton.

In 1925, St Paul's Anglican church burned down. A new St Paul's church was designed by Atkinson Powell & Conrad and built from timber in 1927.

In 1927, Winton got electricity. This "electric light scheme became an accomplished fact" in January of that year, and by December, it had some 160 subscribers. As a business, it was only breaking even, and so it was hoped that there would be more subscribers in the New Year. The project's initial cost was £12,000.

The Prime Minister also came to visit that year. On 2 August 1927, Mr. Stanley Bruce and his wife landed on a flight from Longreach in Winton. The town's chamber of commerce was ready with a deputation, who wished to discuss "health, railway communication links, and the export of stud sheep" with the Prime Minister, thus reflecting the day's issues of local concern. The deputation especially protested the stud sheep exports to Africa. Mr. Bruce told the deputation that his Ministry would not consider banning this practice unless the pastoral industry itself requested such action. To that end, he suggested that the deputation raise the issue with the pastoralists themselves. The Prime Minister left later that day for Hughenden, after having spent less than three hours in Winton.

On 27 February 1928, a famous Australian pioneer aviator, Bert Hinkler, touched down at Winton on his way from Camooweal to Longreach; he also made intermediate stops at Cloncurry and McKinlay.

Also in 1928, the Central Western railway line reached Winton from Longreach. This was the second railway to reach Winton after the line from Hughenden reached town in 1899. The newer line was hailed by one newspaper with the assertion that "It will allow capital that has been lying idle to become revenue producing, it will provide facilities for the transfer of rolling stock, it will provide quicker touch with markets and reduce transport costs, and it will insure the graziers and the State against the probable loss of millions of sheep in drought time."

Despite that reporter's rosy assessment of the boon that the new railway would be to Winton's economy, the 1930s brought Winton's wool industry hard times. A meeting of the local branch of the Graziers' Association of Central and Northern Queensland in 1938 wanted to make known to the general public that for roughly a decade by that time, the revenue brought on the market by wool was outstripped by the production cost, thus incurring loss. The meeting also declared itself in opposition to any plan to register .303 rifles, but decided that their use ought to be restricted to those 18 and over.

The hard times apparently even affected telephone service. In 1936, the whole vast region west of Winton, all the way to Boulia, a distance of roughly 300 km, was served by a single party line – Winton 101 – which was leased from the Winton telephone provider by the Middleton Telephone Company, a private company based in Middleton, about halfway between Winton and Boulia. Only now, the line was falling into disrepair, with attendant unreliability in the service, and there were demands for it to be assumed by the government. The foreseen cost of doing this was then said to be £28,000.

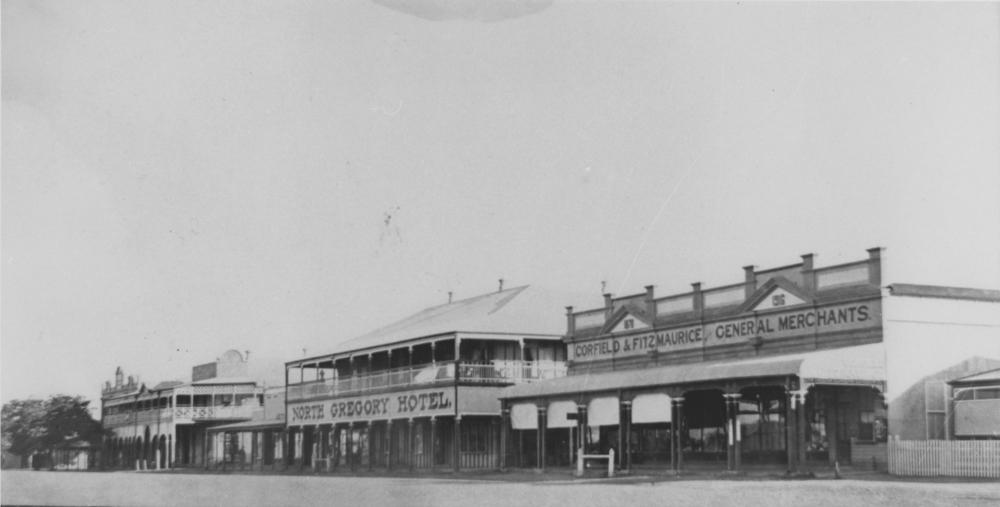
Elderslie Street about 1930. Clearly visible are the North Gregory Hotel as it looked then, and Corfield & Fitzmaurice General Merchants (although by this time, both its founders belonged to the town's history)

Another public service was affected by these hard times, namely the ambulance brigade. A Mr. Charles Holland, from Ipswich, was the chosen one from among 25 applicants from all over Queensland to become Winton's new superintendent of ambulance services. He left Ipswich for Winton on 7 April 1930, only to be dismissed a mere six months later owing to the pitiful state of the Winton ambulance committee's finances. That same year, the Railway Department removed all stationmasters from its line between Winton and Hughenden, although the move apparently did not affect the stationmasters at those two towns. Work on dismantling a railway track that was to have been part of a considerable inland network was undertaken in 1931. The track only ever reached a short distance west of Winton. The work was partly a relief effort, with all the workmen involved in the job being drawn from the local unemployed. The two working railway links at Winton came in handy in 1932 when track washouts along the Queensland coast forced some travellers to take a long inland detour, by way of Winton. Winton railway station became very busy.

On 24 May 1933, which was Empire Day, Winton was honoured with a viceregal visit in the person of Sir Leslie Orme Wilson, the Governor of Queensland. He stayed in town overnight after having arrived by train from Hughenden with his wife, Lady Wilson and his entourage and taking part in a civic reception. His party left again by train the next morning bound for Longreach.

On 3 October 1934, a Qantas plane bound for Winton from Longreach, the Atlanta (in some sources, Atalanta), a de Havilland DH.50, caught fire in the air near its destination and the pilot tried, unsuccessfully, to make an emergency landing not far west of town before the fire on board set the fuel tank off. Complicating matters just then was a dust storm, which made for very poor visibility, and which later also delayed the sighting of the wreck by searchers. The aircraft came down in a ball of fire, killing the pilot and his two business passengers, one of whom, a sandalwood buyer named William McKnoe, was from Winton.

Modern road conditions apparently had yet to come to Winton in 1934. A visiting pastoral company general manager, commenting on roads in western Queensland in general said that the roads in the Shire of Cloncurry were the worst in the state, but added that among streets in the state's towns, Winton's were the worst in Queensland. A heatwave struck Winton the next month, with temperatures reaching a reported 113 °F (45 °C) on 24 November.

On 5 August 1938, Australian Prime Minister Joseph Lyons visited Winton on an extended tour of Queensland, the first Prime Minister to visit the town since Stanley Bruce's visit in 1927. The chairman of the Shire Council, T. J. Shanahan, had a wish list for the Prime Minister. He asked for assistance from both state and federal levels for the wool industry, an "A class" radio station and a railway to the Barclay Tableland (which has never been built). Further deputations also asked for improvements to Winton's aerodrome and for national highways to be built in western Queensland.

It was another nine years before Winton's demands for a radio station were met, and even then, the broadcasts were sent out from Longreach, not Winton. Nevertheless, there was proper wireless service beginning on 19 March 1947, when ABC's transmitter at Longreach came into service.

Disaster struck Winton's business community in September 1938 when a fire tore through several buildings in the middle of town. Destroyed were the Royal Mail Hotel, the Olympia Picture Theatre (whose projection room was in the hotel), a building and a house owned by townsman Stanton Mellick, and a building owned by a man named William Thomson who operated a hardware and saddlery shop with his brother, James Thomson. Some of these buildings contained several businesses. The fire broke out in the cinema's spool room and spread quickly. Firefighters had to deal with low water pressure due to ongoing repairs. The damage caused by the fire was reckoned to be between £17,000 and £18,000. Nobody was injured.

A new St Patrick's Catholic Church was opened on 8 May 1939 by Archbishop of Brisbane James Duhig assisted by Bishop of Rockhampton Romauld Denis Hayes and Bishop of Townsville Hugh Edward Ryan. The church building was designed by C.D. Lynch of Townsville and built by Jerry Rundle of Winton at a cost of £4,735. The first church was relocated behind the school.

=== Second World War and later 20th century ===
In 1939, the Second World War broke out, and Australia joined the Allies. There was a proposal, which met with great enthusiasm in Winton, to form a Western Battalion. A Colonel Hoad delivered a speech in June on the proposal at the Shire Hall before "a big crowd of young men", asking them to join up to show their support for the Western Battalion. Forty men responded by joining up on the spot.

In June 1942, a United States Congressman stayed overnight at the North Gregory Hotel in Winton. This was an uncommon event in itself, especially during the Second World War, but it was made all the more so because he and a number of American military personnel – including two generals – had just survived an emergency landing of The Swoose at Carisbrooke Station, about 85 km southwest of Winton, and also because the Congressman happened to be Lyndon B. Johnson, who was later to become President of the United States.

On 27 June 1946, there was a royal visit as the Duke and Duchess of Gloucester came to visit Winton for half an hour.

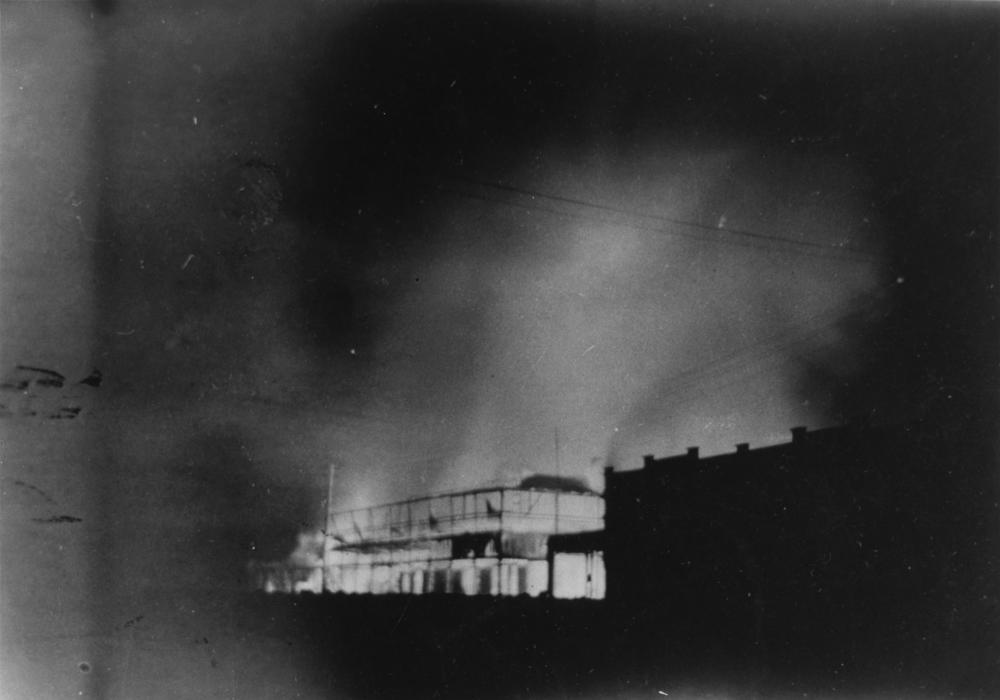
The 1946 North Gregory Hotel fire; silhouetted at right is the Corfield & Fitzmaurice Store.

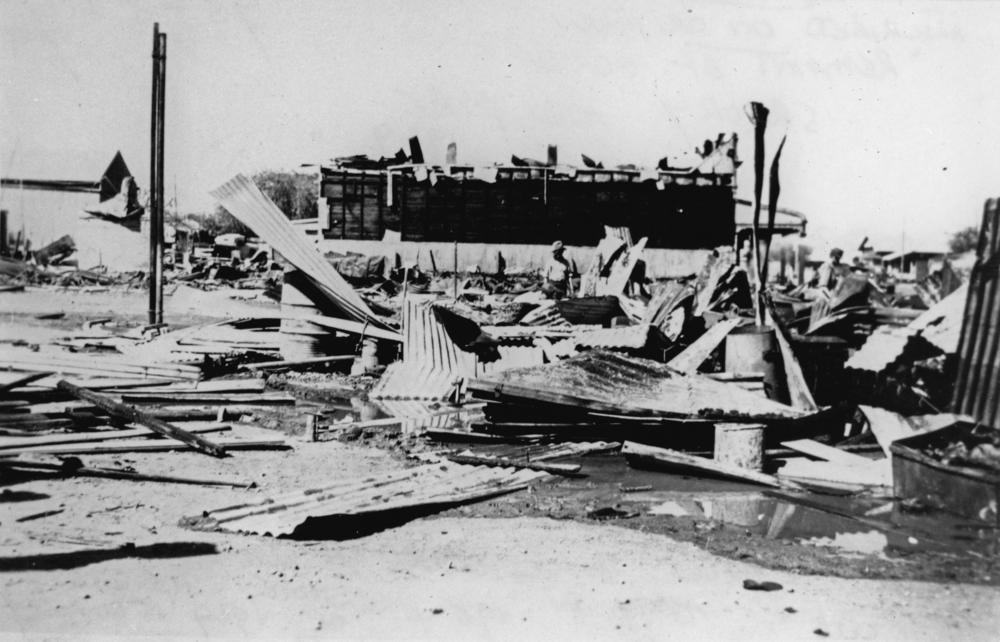
The aftermath

On 7 August 1946, the North Gregory Hotel burnt down, for the third time, in a fire that also consumed several other nearby businesses. Firefighters' efforts were supplemented by a bucket brigade, but even so, the blaze took three hours to quench. The damage was set at £30,000. There was no mention of injuries.

In 1951, Winton held its first rodeo and it was very popular and successful. It quickly became a yearly event, and three years later, 4,700 people came into the town – whose population was then about 1,300 – for the rodeo. There was not enough room for them all at the local hotels, and 600 of them slept on stretcher beds brought into town by local graziers. There was £1050 in prize money.

In 1953, a replacement for the North Gregory Hotel – this one built of brick, not wood – was nearing completion. The task had been taken on by Winton Shire Council because nobody else could be found who was willing to build the replacement. The project's estimated cost was £120,000. As of May that year, the Council still had not decided whether to run the hotel itself or to lease it to another operator. The hotel was to have amenities that were then quite uncommon in Central West Queensland, including air conditioning in the bar, the dining room and the lounge. The town was seeking to provide other, more public amenities in the late 1940s and early 1950s as well, including a £100,000 sewerage scheme and a cooling tower for the artesian bore water, which came out of the ground quite hot. The expenditure of £17,000 on this was "essential if the water is to be 100 per cent. effective for fire-fighting." The same 1948 news item that announced these proposals also mentioned a project for a "municipal hotel", needed after the North Gregory Hotel had burnt down, and the foreseen cost for that was "between £30,000 and £40,000". There were obviously some cost overruns (see above).

In 1962, some fossilized dinosaur tracks were discovered at a quarry and are now on display at their original site in a climate-controlled building at Lark Quarry Dinosaur Trackways some 110 kilometres (68 mi) southwest of Winton.

On 22 September 1966, there was another aviation disaster near Winton. Ansett-ANA Flight 149, a Vickers Viscount aircraft, had taken off from Mount Isa on a 73-minute flight to Longreach, when it ran into trouble 44 minutes into the flight, once an engine fire broke out. The blaze quickly spread to the fuel tank, resulting in part of the left wing breaking away. This sealed the aircraft's fate. It crashed some 19 kilometres (12 mi) west of Winton, at Nadjayamba Station, killing all 24 people on board. The crash site was not very far from where the 1934 Atlanta disaster had happened. On the 40th anniversary of the accident in 2006, a memorial was unveiled in the main street of Winton.

A third St Patrick's Catholic Church was built in 1970; it was a brick church.

External image
- Photograph of memorial in Winton, plus 3 photographs of the crash site and 10 of the aircraft

In "1972/73", a new festival began in Winton, the Outback Festival. This is held every other year, in odd-numbered years, in September, and was originally conceived as something that would boost Winton's local economy, for the years leading up to the first Outback Festival had been drought years.

In November 1974, Winton got its own television transmitter, ABWNQ-8. This broadcasts the Australian Broadcasting Corporation's Queensland service, based in Brisbane. The tower stands about 20 km north of town.

Another Prime Minister visited Winton in 1979, Malcolm Fraser. He used the occasion to make known his government's intention to undertake "an urgent inquiry on how to overcome worsening fuel shortages."

In April 1995, Winton marked the centenary of "Waltzing Matilda" with a festival. Prime Minister Paul Keating and Queensland Premier Wayne Goss showed up for the festivities, and among other things, they unveiled a statue of Banjo Paterson. In 1998, the Waltzing Matilda Centre opened.

In 1999, a huge Cretaceous sauropod about 95 million years old was unearthed near Winton. It was dubbed "Elliot".

=== 21st century ===
In 2002, a "non‐profit science initiative" named Australian Age of Dinosaurs was established whose aim is to expose Australian dinosaurs at a world-class museum. One project sought to contain the Lark Quarry Dinosaur Trackways near Opalton inside a climate-controlled building to preserve and display them, a project that has been accomplished. In 2009, three new dinosaur species were given their scientific nomenclature (with nicknames in round brackets). They are Australovenator wintonensis ("Banjo"), Diamantinasaurus matildae ("Matilda") and Wintonotitan wattsi ("Clancy").

A cultural disaster struck Winton in June 2015 when the Waltzing Matilda Centre burnt down, destroying many artefacts.

On the night of 17 June 2015, fire broke out in the Waltzing Matilda Centre, the building that housed town's information centre and a museum housing a collection of historic artifacts. Firefighters arrived within minutes to find the rear of the building engulfed in flames, the teams fought desperately to save the front of the building and any artifacts that hadn't already been destroyed. Despite all efforts, the entire structure was reduced to a smouldering wreck with little evidence of the building ever housing such a unique museum. The fire has been deemed unsuspicious and investigators are currently looking for clues to the cause of the blaze. The building was unoccupied at the time of the fire and there were no casualties. The rebuilt museum reopened in April 2018.

== Demographics ==
In the 2011 census, the town of Winton had a population of 954 people.

In the 2016 census, the locality of Winton had a population of 875 people.

In the 2021 census, the locality of Winton had a population of 856 people.

== Heritage listings ==
Winton has a number of heritage-listed sites, including:

- 63 Elderslie Street: Corfield & Fitzmaurice Store
- Winton–Boulia Road, Middleton: Elderslie Homestead

== Education ==
Winton State School is a government primary and secondary (Prep–12) school for boys and girls at 71 Cork Street (22.3856°S 143.0387°E). In 2018, the school had an enrolment of 90 students with 13 teachers (12 full-time equivalent) and 14 non-teaching staff (9 full-time equivalent).

St Patrick's Catholic School is a private primary (Prep–6) school at Oondooroo Street (22.3851°S 143.0399°E). In 2023, the school had an enrolment of 40 students with 4 teachers (4 full-time equivalent) and 5 non-teaching staff (3.3 full-time equivalent).

== Amenities ==
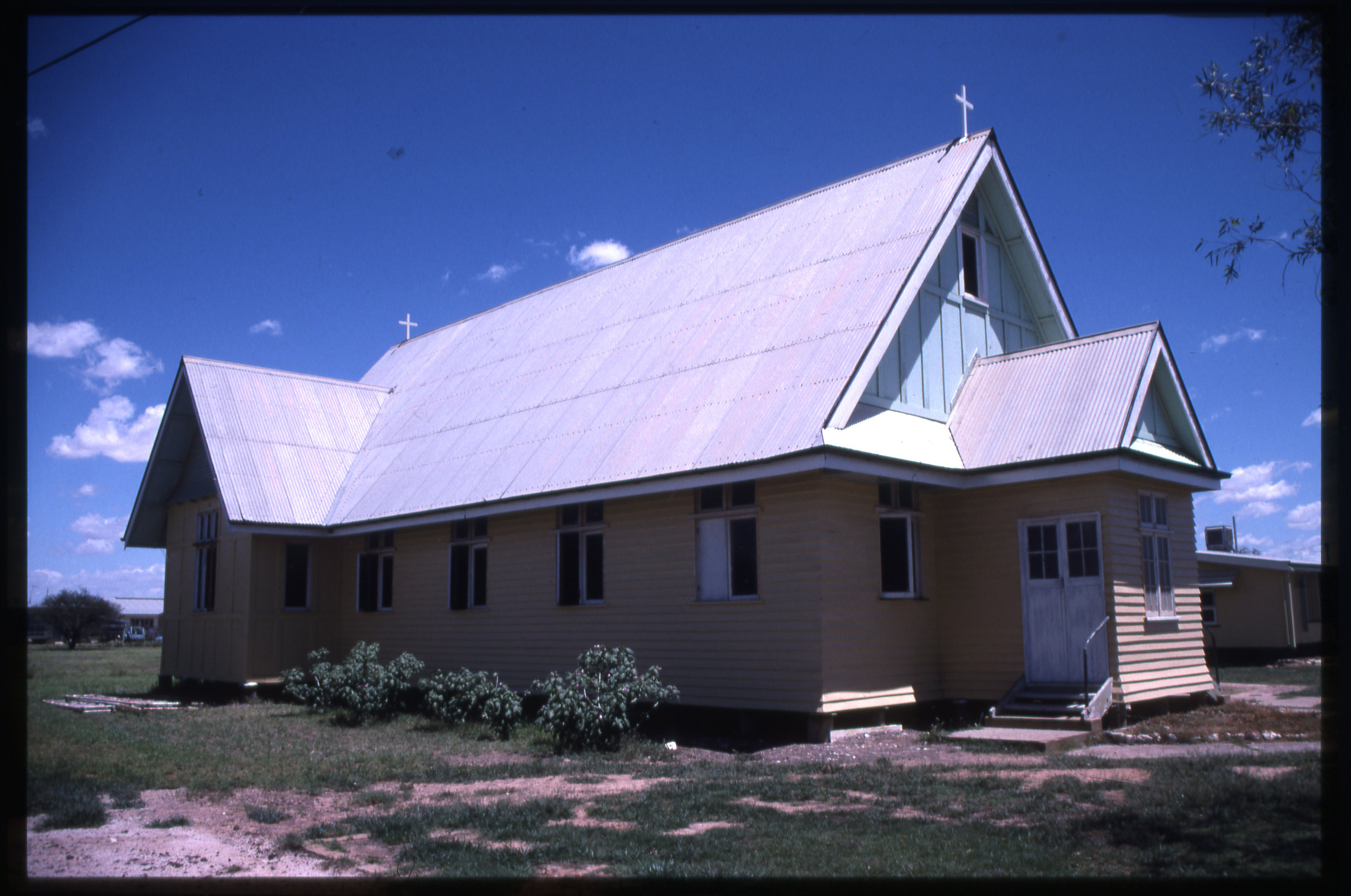
St Pauls Anglican Church, Winton, 1995

Winton has a range of facilities available to the public, including a showground, racecourse, golf, bowls, skate park, and swimming facilities and a public library.

The Winton Shire Council Library Service operates a library at 76 Elderslie Street with a High-Speed ISDN Internet Connection (powered through the National Broadband Network) to Brisbane.

The Winton branch of the Queensland Country Women's Association has its rooms at 47 Vindex Street.

St Patrick's Catholic Church is at 51 Cork Street (22.385669°S 143.04°E).

St Paul's Anglican Church is at 72 Cork Street (22.386044°S 143.038°E).

Winton Christian Fellowship is at 38 Werna Street (22.386974°S 143.037°E).

Winton Airport is located about 5.6 kilometres (3.5 mi) northeast of Winton.

== Transport ==
Winton is situated at the crossroads of the Landsborough Highway and the Kennedy Developmental Road, 177 kilometres (110 miles) northwest of Longreach, 865 kilometres (537 miles) northwest of Rockhampton, 1,153 kilometres (716 miles) northwest of Brisbane and 441 kilometres (274 miles) south-east of Mount Isa.

Winton is the terminus of the Central Western Railway Line from Rockhampton and was until 2008, the terminus of the Hughenden-Winton railway line which linked Winton to Hughenden on the Great Northern Railway (Mount Isa Line)

Winton is a timetabled stop for the following intercity bus services run by Greyhound Australia

- GX493 Brisbane – Mount Isa
- GX494 Mount Isa – Brisbane

== Events ==
=== Outback Festival ===
The Outback Festival has been recognised since 1991 winning many Outback Queensland Tourism accolades including the recent 2012 Winner of the Outback Queensland Tourism Awards for Festivals and Events and finalist at the Queensland Regional Achievement and Community Awards. The Festival being one of three chosen from over 90 Queensland organizations for the Community of Year Award. Featured events include the Quilton Australian Dunny Derby. The Outback Century Cycle Challenge is also held over this event period, attracting competitors from all over Australia for their one chance in every two years of mastering the outback course.

=== The Vision Splendid Outback Film Festival ===
Since 2014, The Vision Splendid Outback Film Festival has been held annually in the town.

During the festival, a person involved in the Australian film industry is traditionally honoured with a star on Winton's Walk of Fame in Elderslie Street. Since the festival's inception, Roy Billing, Ivan Sen, Margaret Pomeranz, Butch Lenton, Steve Le Marquand and David Gulpilil have all received stars.

=== Camel racing ===
Camel racing is held in Winton.

== Attractions ==
Winton's visitor centre is located in the Waltzing Matilda Centre. The town has a range of museums including the heritage-listed former Corfield and Fitzmaurice emporium as well as the heritage truck and machinery museum.

=== Waltzing Matilda Centre ===
Winton is intimately involved in the story of the popular Australian folk song, "Waltzing Matilda", which had its first performance in the North Gregory Hotel in the town. The Waltzing Matilda Centre opened in 1998 and is the first museum dedicated to a song. The song was written by 'Banjo' Paterson whilst holidaying at a local property, Dagworth Station. The music for the song was arranged by Christina Macpherson, the sister of the station manager who was visiting at the same time.

In 2012, to remind Australians of the song's significance, Winton organised the inaugural Waltzing Matilda Day to be held on 6 April, the anniversary of its first performance.

=== Royal Theatre ===
The historic Royal Open-Air Theatre is one of the few remaining open-air picture theatres in Australia.

=== Arno's Wall ===
Arno's wall is a strange mixture of art and architecture. Cemented contents of the wall include rusted lawnmower parts, boat propellers, vintage typewriters and sewing machines and even a couple of complete motorbikes. A photograph of the wall by Gordon Undy is in the National Library of Australia digital collection.

== In popular culture ==
The 2005 film The Proposition was filmed entirely in Winton and the surrounding area.

The 2013 film Mystery Road was also filmed in Winton and the surrounding area.

The 2015 film Kirrendirri – Lost and Alone is a documentary which interviews descendants of the massacred Aboriginal people.

The 2016 film Goldstone used Winton as a part of their film set.

The 2019 ABC Series Total Control was filmed partly in and around the Winton area.

The third episode of The Amazing Race Australia 5 was filmed in Winton.
