= KOA Corporation =

- KOA Corporation logo
- Company type: Public
- Industry: Electronic components
- Founded: March 10, 1940; 85 years ago in Tokyo, Japan
- Founder: Kazuto Mukaiyama
- Products: Resistors, thermistors, inductors, fuses, varistors
- Website: https://www.koaglobal.com

KOA Corporation (Japanese: コーア株式会社, Kōa kabushiki kaisha; TYO: 6999) is a multinational passive electronic components supplier based in Japan. The company was founded on March 10, 1940 and registered to become a public corporation on May 24, 1947. They manufacture resistors and other electronic parts.
