= Guwa language =

Australian Aboriginal language of the Koa people, Queensland

Guwa
- Goa
- Native to: Australia
- Region: "Karna–Mari fringe", Queensland
- Ethnicity: Koa people
- Extinct: (date missing)
- Language family: Pama–Nyungan: (unclassified, possibly Maric); Guwa–Yanda; Guwa

Language codes
- ISO 639-3: xgw
- Glottolog: guwa1242
- AIATSIS: G9.1
- ELP: Guwa

Guwa, also spelt Goa, Koa, and other variants, is an extinct and nearly unattested Australian Aboriginal language of Queensland spoken by the Koa people. It was apparently close to Yanda.

== Name ==
The name "Guwa" was thought by Gavan Breen to mean 'west'; this naming is also found in other languages of Queensland.

== Dialects ==
Guwa had a western and eastern dialect differentiation.

== History ==
=== Documentation ===
Edward Micklethwaite Curr published three wordlists in Guwa, one by Edward Curr, another by Montagu Curr, and the last by John Haines. Walter Roth published a comparative vocabulary in 1897. A comparative vocabulary including Guwa was also published in the Australasian Anthropological Journal (later renamed Science of Man) that same year. E. C. Lamb also obtained a vocabulary of Goa, published in the same journal in 1899; the magazine also included a comparative table with Guwa words in 1901 (also republished in 1907 with a different interpretation of the handwriting), followed by two wordlists, one calling the language "Kynuna" and the other "Goore" in 1906. J.S. Dutton collected vocabulary items and place names from Opalton, which were published in 1906 in Science of Man. Norman Tindale collected a wordlist in 1938, which remained unpublished. Louie Hunter, a speaker of Kalkatungu, was also able to provide a few words of Guwa in a recording made in 1970.

== Phonology ==
Based on the available data and other languages of the region, the following phoneme inventory can be determined.

=== Consonants ===
	Peripheral		Apical		Laminal	
	Labial	Velar	Alveolar	Retroflex	Dental	Palatal
Plosive	p	k	t	ʈ	t̪	c
Nasal	m	ŋ	n	ɳ	n̪	ɲ
Rhotic			ɾ ~ r	ɻ		
Lateral			l	(ɭ)	(l̪)	ʎ
Approximant	w					j

There is some doubt to the presence of laterals /l̪, ɭ/. No evidence from the data itself confirms the existence of /ɭ/.

=== Vowels ===
Guwa has a three-vowel system /i, a, u/.

== Morphology ==
=== Case ===
It is likely that Guwa had a grammatical case system. The expression murrangoowunyah /mara-ŋku wana-ja/ 'release' (where /mara/ is 'hand') likely contains the instrumental case with a form /-ŋku/. Gavan Breen also identified a locative suffix /-ŋka/ in karrunga /kaRa-ŋka/ 'tomorrow' and toorongaro /t̪uru-ŋka-Ru/ 'day', which Breen thought was likely an inflected form of /t̪uru/ 'sun'.
