= Shire of Winton =

Coordinates: 22°23′16″S 143°02′04″E

- Local government area
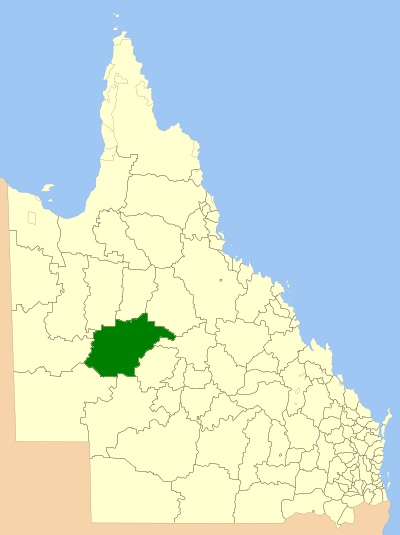
- Location within Queensland

- Interactive map of Shire of Winton
- Country: Australia
- State: Queensland
- Region: Central West Queensland
- Established: 1886
- Council seat: Winton

Government
  - Mayor: Cathy White
  - State electorate: Gregory
  - Federal division: Maranoa

Area
  - Total: 53,814 km^{2} (20,778 sq mi)

Population
  - Total: 1,129 (2021 census)
  - Density: 0.020980/km^{2} (0.054337/sq mi)
- Website: Shire of Winton
LGAs around Shire of Winton
Cloncurry, McKinlay	Richmond	Flinders
Boulia	Shire of Winton	Barcaldine
Diamantina	Barcoo	Longreach

The Shire of Winton is a local government area in Central West Queensland, Australia. It covers an area of 53,814 square kilometres (20,777.7 sq mi), and has existed as a local government entity since 1887. Its administrative centre is located in the town of Winton. It is named after Winton, Dorset, England, the birthplace of Robert Allen, the first white settler in the Winton (Queensland) area.

The major industry in the shire is beef production and some opal mining. There has been some development of the known oil and gas reserves in the region.

In the 2021 census, the Shire of Winton had a population of 1,129 people.

== History ==
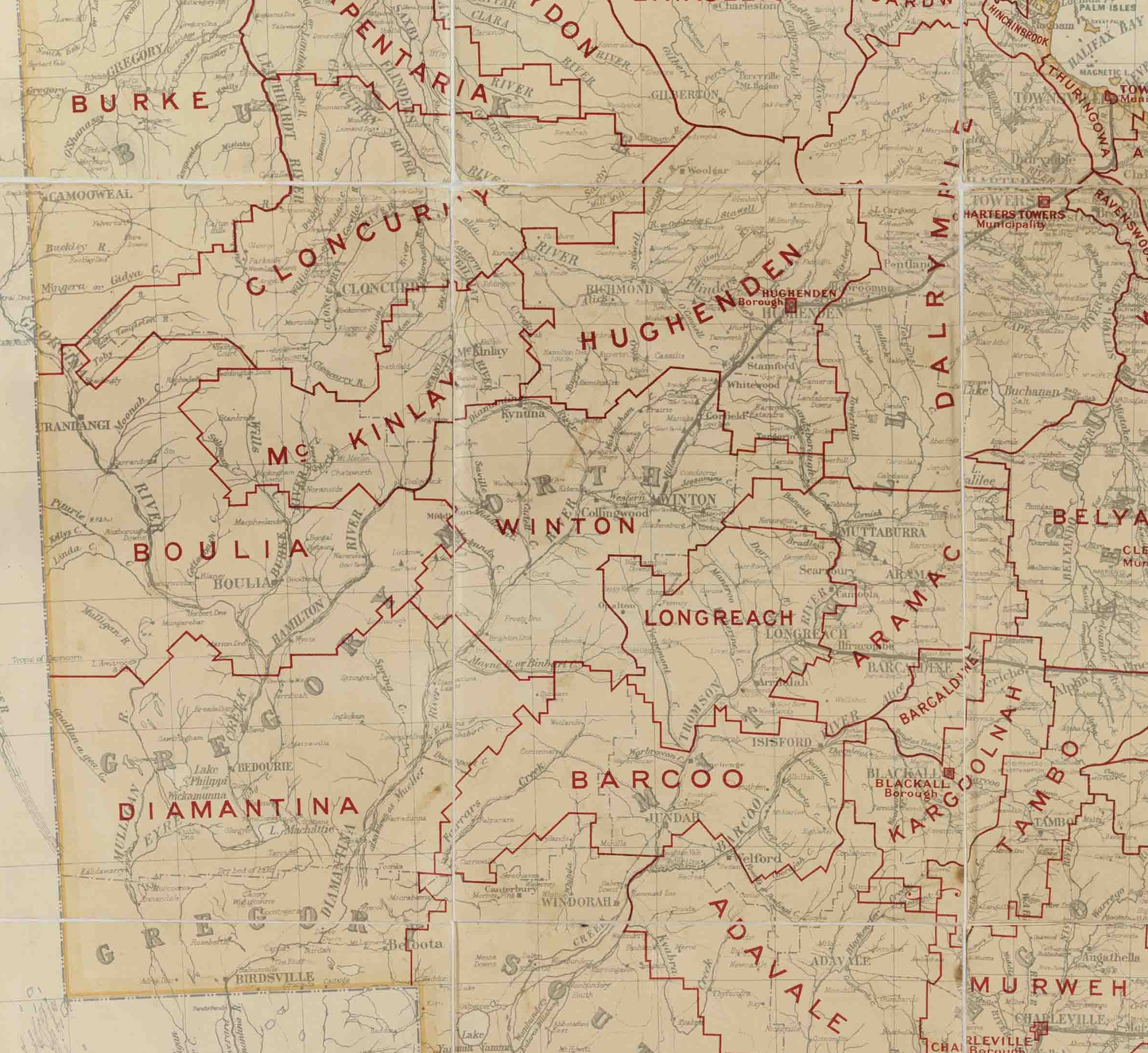
Map of Winton Division and adjacent local government areas, March 1902

The Winton Division was created on 23 September 1886 under the Divisional Boards Act 1879.

With the passage of the Local Authorities Act 1902, Winton Division became the Shire of Winton on 31 March 1903.

It subsequently lost an area in its northwest to the Shire of McKinlay on 24 July 1930.

== Towns and localities ==
The Shire of Winton includes the following settlements:

- Winton
- Collingwood (ghost town)
- Corfield
- Middleton
- Opalton

== Amenities ==
Winton Shire Council operates a public library at Winton.

== Chairmen and mayors ==
Initially, the chairman/mayor was chosen by the elected councillors from among themselves. Later, it became a separate role elected by the public. The chairmen and mayors of the Winton Divisional Board and the Winton Shire Council include:

- 1887–1889 J. B. Riley
- 1889–1890 Robert Christian Ramsay
- 1890–1891 M. F. Ramsay
- 1891–1898 A. G. Fraser
- 1898–1901 Robert Christian Ramsay (2nd term)
- 1901–1901 William Henry Corfield
- 1901–1903 Robert Logan Chirnside
- 1903–1907 Robert Christian Ramsay (3rd term)
- 1907–1910 Arthur Douglas Ramsay
- 1910–1912 W. H. Cameron
- 1913–1920 Andrew John Baxter McMaster
- 1920–1921 Robert Edward Jackson
- 1921–1924 Andrew John Baxter McMaster (2nd term)
- 1924–1927 Leonard Irving
- 1927–1930 Percy Neil Grieve
- 1930–1934 John Rupert Wilfred Kennedy
- 1934–1946 Thomas Joseph Shanahan
- 1946–1955 Edward Charles Pender Phillott
- 1955–1958 Walter de Levante Booty
- 1958–1964 Edward Charles Pender Phillott (2nd term)
- 1964–1976 Charles Kempson Maxwell
- 1976–1981 William Joseph Harold Holmes
- 1981–1987 Eric Barton Bryce
- 1987–1995 Erice Muir Lenton
- 1995–2007 S. B. (Bruce) Collins
- 2008–2012 Edward Lawrence (Ed) Warren
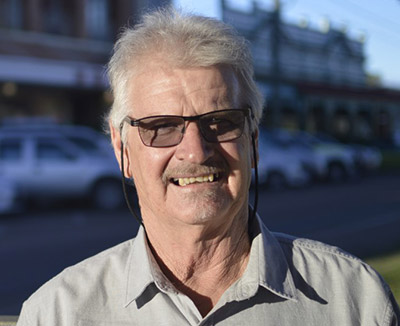
- Butch Lenton, Mayor, 2012–2017
  2012–2017 Graham Thomas (Butch) Lenton (died in office)
- 2017–2024 Gavin John Baskett
- 2024–Present Cathy White

In the 2008 election, the two candidates Ed Lawrence and Butch Lenton received the same number of votes. The winner, Ed Lawrence, was decided by drawing a name from a hat.

In the 2016 election Butch Lenton was elected unopposed. He died in office on 1 October 2017 in Winton, which resulted in a by-election. He was posthumously named as one of the Queensland Greats by Queensland Premier Annastacia Palaszczuk in a ceremony at the Queensland Art Gallery on 8 June 2018.

== Demographics ==
Year	Population	Notes
1933	2,807	
1947	2,509	
1954	2,532	
1961	3,043	
1966	2,688	
1971	2,095	
1976	1,938	
1981	1,995	
1986	1,986	
1991	1,877	
1996	1,731	
2001	1,939	
2006	1,380	
2011	1,336	
2016	1,134	
2021	1,129	
