= Adelaide Chamber Singers =

Australian chamber choir

- Origin: Adelaide
- Years active: 1985-

Adelaide Chamber Singers is an Australian chamber choir. Along with Greta Bradman, Adelaide Symphony Orchestra and Luke Dollman they received a nomination for the 2018 ARIA Awards for Best Classical Album with the album Home.

== Discography ==
=== Albums ===
List of albums, with Australian chart positions
Title	Album details	Peak chart positions
Title	Album details	AUS
Home (with Greta Bradman, Adelaide Symphony Orchestra & Luke Dollman)	Released: April 2018; Format: CD, Digital; Label: Greta Bradman, Decca (481 6564)	30

== Awards and nominations ==
=== ARIA Music Awards ===
The ARIA Music Awards are presented annually from 1987 by the Australian Recording Industry Association (ARIA).

Year	Nominee / work	Award	Result	Ref.
2018	Home (with Adelaide Symphony Orchestra, Adelaide Chamber Singers & Luke Dollman)	Best Classical Album	Nominated	
