= Cricket balls associated with Don Bradman's career =

Three cricket balls are preserved in Australian museum collections due to their association with the early career of cricketer Don Bradman.

== Description ==
=== Ball from first match for New South Wales ===
Ball used in Bradman’s first match for New South Wales

A leather cricket ball held by the State Library of South Australia was used in a match between the New South Wales cricket team and the Barrier District side in December 1927. This was Bradman's first match representing New South Wales.

=== Ball from first Sheffield Shield match ===
Ball used in Bradman’s first Sheffield Shield match against South Australia at Adelaide Oval

A red leather cricket ball is documented as being used in a Sheffield Shield match between South Australia and New South Wales at Adelaide Oval from 16 to 21 December 1927. This was Bradman's first-class debut. The ball was subsequently given to C. V. Grimmett and mounted with a silver plaque. In that match, Bradman scored 118 runs in the first innings and 33 runs in the second innings. An image of the engraved shield design on the ball was published in The Saturday Journal (Adelaide) on 24 December 1927.

=== Ball from Test debut ===
Ball used in Bradman’s Test debut: Australia vs England, Brisbane, 1928

A cricket ball held by the Australian Sports Museum was used during the First Test of the 1928–29 Ashes series at the Brisbane Cricket Ground from 30 November to 5 December 1928. This match marked Bradman's Test debut for the Australia against England. Bradman scored 18 runs in the first innings and 1 run in the second innings in that match.

== See also ==
- Don Bradman
- Sheffield Shield
- The Ashes
- Sports memorabilia
- Bradman Museum & International Cricket Hall of Fame
