= John Bradman =

Australian academic (born 1939)

- Born: June 10, 1939 (age 87); Adelaide, South Australia, Australia
- Other name: John Bradsen
- Occupation: Academic
- Spouse: Judith (div. 1994)
- Partner: Megan Kate Webster
- Children: 3, including Greta and Nick Bradman
- Parent: Sir Don Bradman (father)

Academic background
- Education: The University of Adelaide

John Russell Bradman (born June 10, 1939) is an Australian academic who taught at the law school of the University of Adelaide, lecturing in constitutional and environmental law. He is the son of Australian cricketer Sir Donald Bradman, and has been the spokesperson for the Bradman family on a number of public issues—particularly in relation to the "exploitation" of his father's name.

== Life and family ==
John Bradman was previously known as John Bradsen, having changed his last name in his early thirties to avoid the pressures associated with the name's celebrity. He stated that the change was not "to pretend I was somebody other than who I was but simply to say... please give me a break". His ex-wife still goes by the name Judith Bradsen. However, John and his children reverted to the Bradman surname shortly before Sir Don's death; the patriarch was reportedly "tickled pink" by the news.

John Bradman featured in an episode of the Australian TV show Australian Story, "Being Bradman", which aired in 2015. John Bradman also appeared in the documentary "Bradman and Tendulkar", which aired on the Australian Broadcasting Corporation in 2023. He has been the regular presenter of the Don Award for the Sport Australia Hall of Fame.

He has three children: Greta, Tom and Nick. Greta Bradman is an operatic soprano, psychologist, and radio broadcaster. She has released multiple albums and performed at numerous national events in Australia, including the State Memorial Service of Shane Warne. Tom Bradman worked at the Australian Department of Agriculture before taking up farming, appearing on the Australian TV show Landline, in which he discussed his approach to regenerative agriculture. In 2017, Nick Bradman appeared on the front cover of the South Australian newspaper The Advertiser, after attaining an ATAR of 99.95 (eclipsing his grandfather's batting average of 99.94). He subsequently received the University Medal in law from the Australian National University. Nick's mother (John's current partner) is Megan Webster-Bradman.
