= Don Bradman =

Australian cricketer (1908–2001)

Sir Don Bradman AC
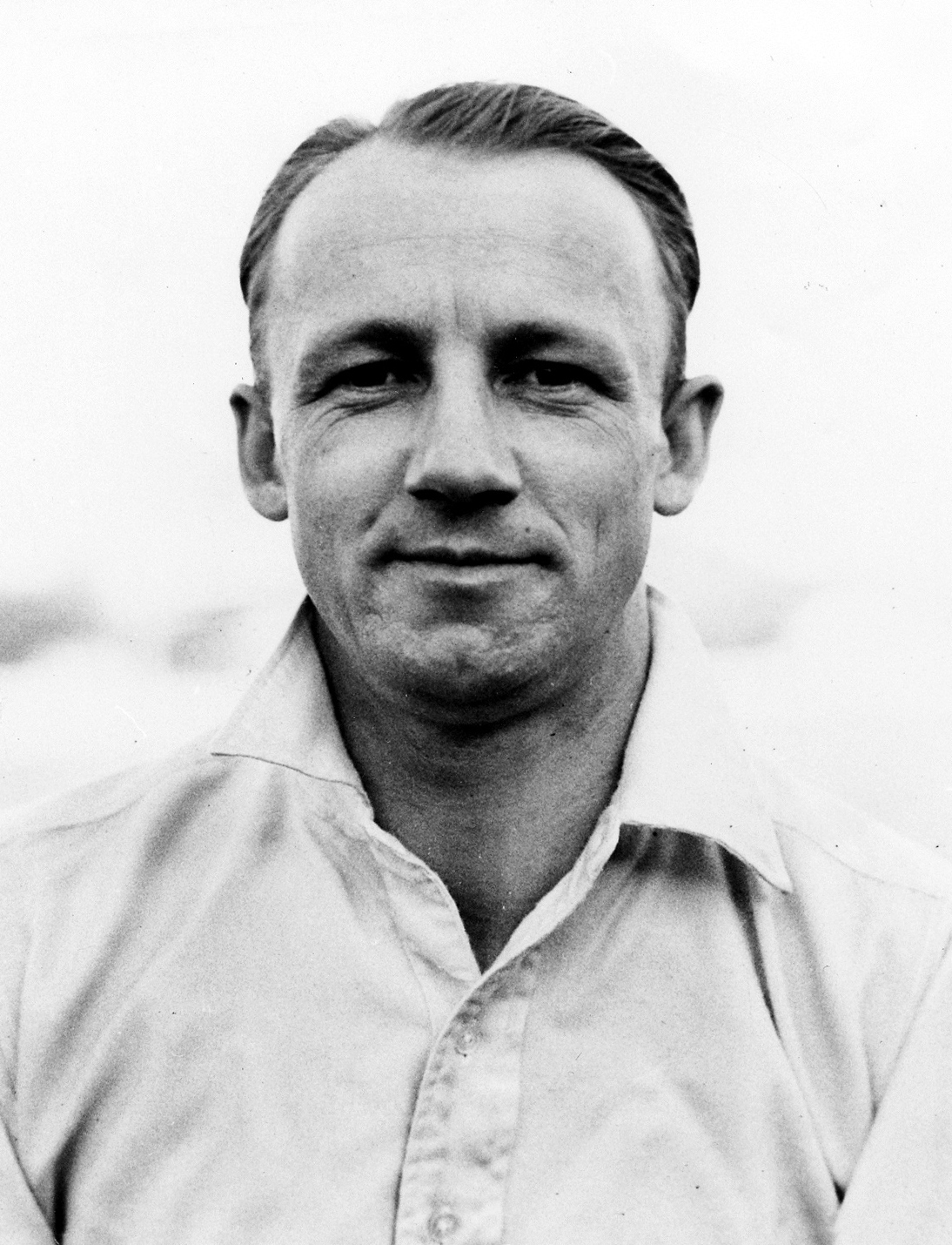
- Bradman c. 1930

Personal details
- Born: 27 August 1908 Cootamundra, New South Wales, Australia
- Died: 25 February 2001 (aged 92) Kensington Park, South Australia, Australia

Military service
- Allegiance: Australia
- Branch/service: Royal Australian Air Force; Australian Army
- Years of service: 1940–1941
- Rank: Lieutenant
- Unit: Army School of Physical Training
- Battles/wars: Second World War
- Cricket career

Personal information
- Full name: Donald George Bradman
- Nickname: The Don; The Boy from Bowral; Braddles; The White Headley
- Height: 1.70 m (5 ft 7 in)
- Batting: Right-handed
- Bowling: Right-arm leg break
- Role: Batsman
- Relatives: 3 children, including John; 3 grandchildren, including Greta

International information
- National side: Australia (1928–1948)
- Test debut (cap 124): 30 November 1928 v England
- Last Test: 18 August 1948 v England

Domestic team information
- Years: Team
- 1927/28–1933/34: New South Wales
- 1935/36–1948/49: South Australia

Career statistics
Competition	Test	First-class
Matches	52	234
Runs scored	6,996	28,067
Batting average	99.94	95.14
100s/50s	29/13	117/69
Top score	334	452*
Balls bowled	160	2,114
Wickets	2	36
Bowling average	36.00	37.97
5 wickets in innings	0	0
10 wickets in match	0	0
Best bowling	1/8	3/35
Catches/stumpings	32/–	131/1
- Source: ESPNcricinfo, 4 December 2014

Sir Donald George Bradman (27 August 1908 – 25 February 2001), nicknamed "the Don", was an Australian international cricketer, widely acknowledged as the greatest batsman of all time. His cricketing successes have been claimed by Shane Warne, among others, to make Bradman the "greatest sportsperson" in history. Bradman's career Test batting average of 99.94 is considered by some to be the greatest achievement by any sportsman in any major sport.

The story that the young Bradman practised alone with a cricket stump and a golf ball is part of Australian folklore. His meteoric rise from bush cricket to the Australian Test team took just over two years. Before his 22nd birthday, he had set many records for top-scoring, some of which still stand, and became Australia's sporting idol at the height of the Great Depression. This hero status grew and continued through the Second World War.

During a 20-year playing career, Bradman consistently scored at a level that made him, in the words of former Australia captain Bill Woodfull, "worth three batsmen to Australia". A controversial set of tactics, known as Bodyline, was specially devised by the England team to curb his scoring. As a captain and administrator, Bradman was committed to attacking, entertaining cricket; he drew spectators in record numbers. He hated the constant adulation, however, and it affected how he dealt with others. The focus of attention on Bradman's individual performances strained relationships with some teammates, administrators and journalists, who thought him aloof and wary. Following an enforced hiatus due to the Second World War, he made a dramatic comeback, captaining an Australian team known as "the Invincibles" on a record-breaking unbeaten tour of England.

A complex and highly driven man, not given to close personal relationships, Bradman retained a pre-eminent position in the game by acting as an administrator, selector and writer for three decades following his retirement. Even after he became reclusive in his declining years, Bradman's opinion was highly sought, and his status as a national icon was still recognised. Almost fifty years after his retirement as a Test player, in 1997, Prime Minister John Howard called him the "greatest living Australian". Bradman's image has appeared on postage stamps and coins, and a museum dedicated to his life was opened while he was still living. On the centenary of his birth, 27 August 2008, the Royal Australian Mint issued a $5 commemorative gold coin with Bradman's image. In 2009, he was inducted posthumously as an inaugural member into the ICC Cricket Hall of Fame.

== Early years ==
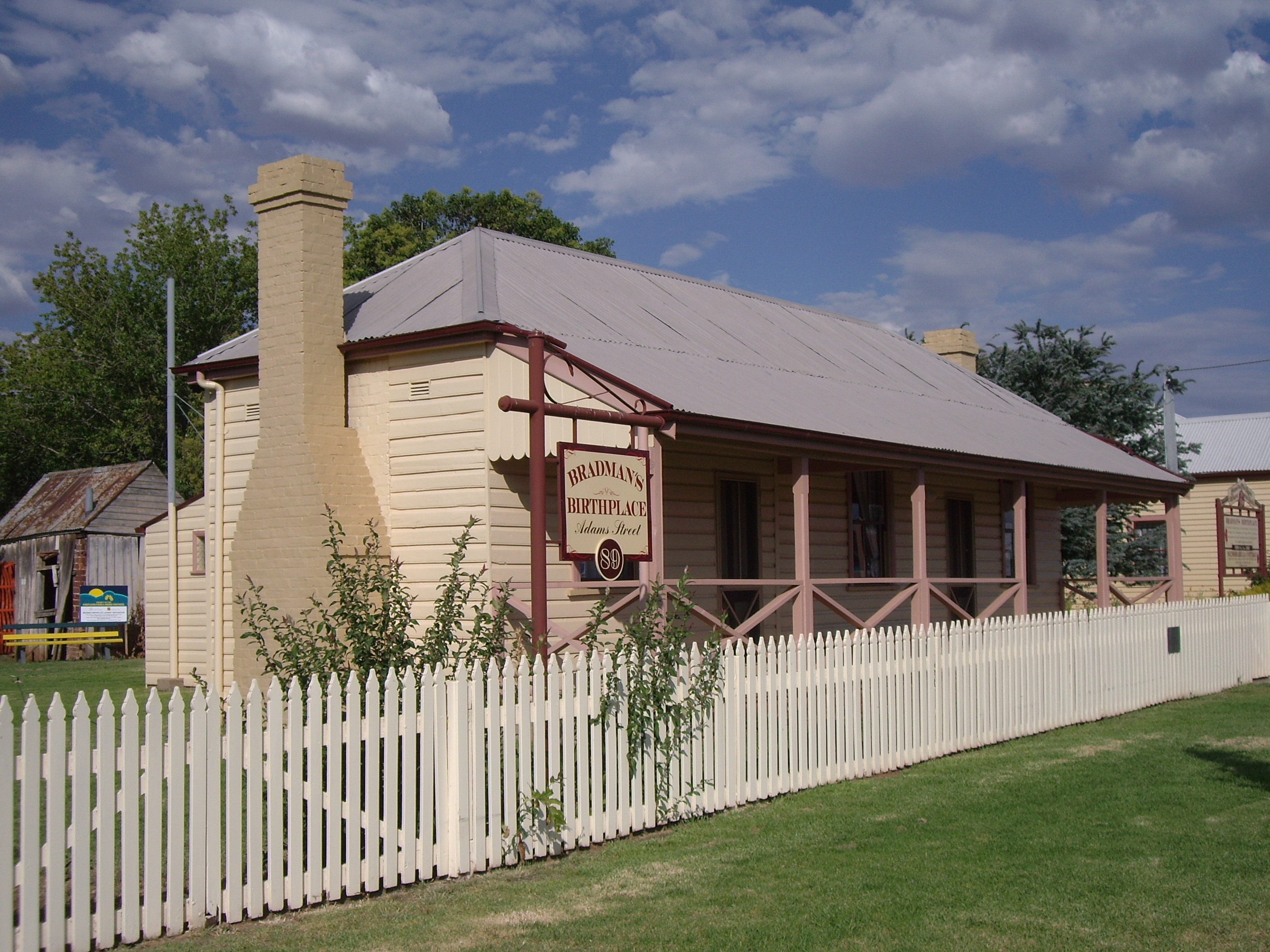
Bradman's birthplace at Cootamundra is now a museum.

Donald George Bradman was the youngest son of George and Emily (née Whatman) Bradman, and was born on 27 August 1908 in Cootamundra, New South Wales. He had a brother, Victor, and three sisters – Islet, Lilian and Elizabeth May.

Bradman was of English heritage on both sides of his family. His grandfather Charles Andrew Bradman had left Withersfield, Suffolk, for Australia. In 1930, when he played at Cambridge during his first tour of England, 21-year-old Bradman took the opportunity to trace his forebears in the region. Bradman was also partly of Italian lineage; one of his great-grandfathers had been one of the first Italians to migrate to Australia in 1826.

Bradman's parents lived in the hamlet of Yeo Yeo, near Stockinbingal. His mother, Emily, gave birth to him at the Cootamundra home of Granny Scholz, a midwife, which is now the Bradman Birthplace Museum. Bradman's mother had hailed from Mittagong in the NSW Southern Highlands and in 1911, when Bradman was about two-and-a-half years old, his parents decided to relocate to Bowral, close to Emily's family and friends in Mittagong, as life at Yeo Yeo was proving difficult. Emily, who bowled left-arm spin, played in the women's intercolonial cricket competition between the main states in the 1890s.

Bradman practised batting incessantly during his youth. He invented his own solo cricket game, using a cricket stump for a bat and a golf ball. A water tank, mounted on a curved brick stand, stood on a paved area behind the family home. When hit into the curved brick facing of the stand, the ball rebounded at high speed and varying angles – and Bradman would attempt to hit it again. This form of practice developed his timing and reactions to a high degree. In more formal cricket, Bradman hit his first century at the age of 12, with an undefeated 115 playing for Bowral Public School against Mittagong High School.

=== Bush cricketer ===
During the 1920–21 season, Bradman acted as scorer for the local Bowral team, captained by his uncle George Whatman. In October 1920, he filled in when the team was one man short, scoring 37* and 29* on debut. During the season, Bradman's father took him to the Sydney Cricket Ground (SCG) to watch the fifth Ashes Test match. On that day, Bradman formed an ambition, telling his father: "I shall never be satisfied until I play on this ground." Bradman left school in 1922 and went to work for a local real estate agent who encouraged his sporting pursuits by giving him time off when necessary. He gave up cricket in favour of tennis for two years but resumed playing cricket in 1925–26.

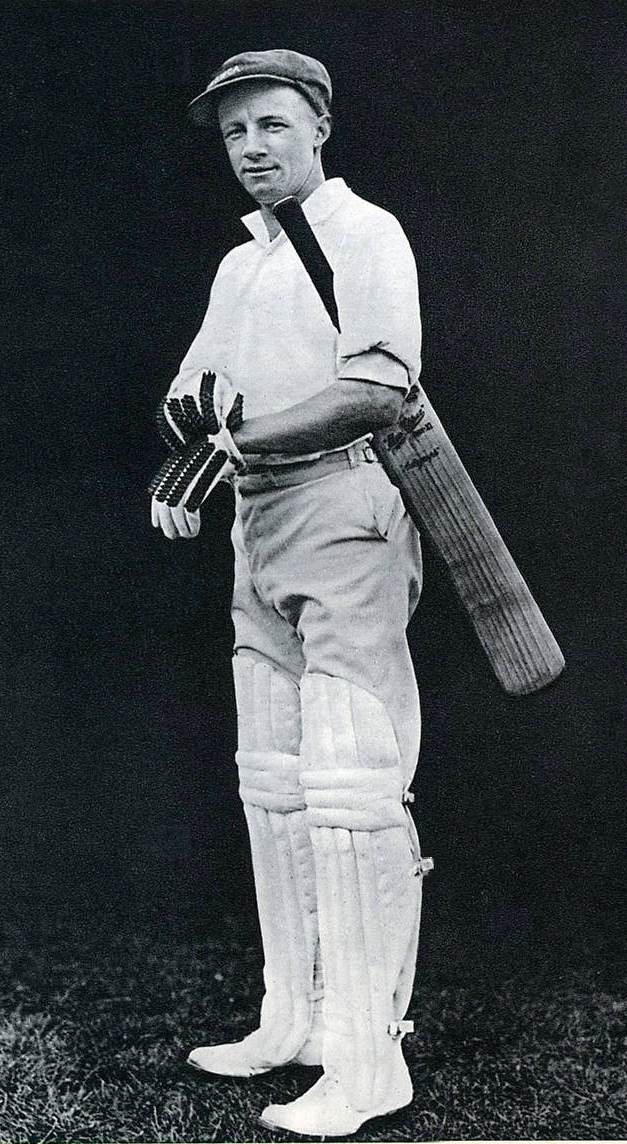
Bradman in 1928

Bradman became a regular selection for the Bowral team; several outstanding performances earned him the attention of Sydney newspapers. Competing on matting-over-concrete pitches, Bowral played other rural towns in the Berrima District competition. Against Wingello, a team that included the future Test bowler Bill O'Reilly, Bradman made 234. In the competition final against Moss Vale, which extended over five consecutive Saturdays, Bradman scored 320 not out.

During the following Australian winter (1926), the ageing Australian team lost The Ashes in England, and a number of Test players retired. The New South Wales Cricket Association began a hunt for new talent. Mindful of Bradman's big scores for Bowral, the association wrote to him, requesting his attendance at a practice session in Sydney. He was subsequently chosen for the "Country Week" tournaments at both cricket and tennis, to be played during separate weeks. Bradman's boss presented him with an ultimatum: he could have only one week away from work, and therefore had to choose between the two sports. He chose cricket.

Bradman's performances during Country Week resulted in an invitation to play grade cricket in Sydney for St George in the 1926–27 season. He scored 110 on his debut, making his first century on a turf pitch. On 1 January 1927, Bradman turned out for the NSW second team. For the remainder of the season, he travelled the 130 kilometres (81 mi) from Bowral to Sydney every Saturday to play for St George.

=== First-class debut ===
The next season continued the rapid rise of the "Boy from Bowral". Selected to replace the unfit Archie Jackson in the NSW team, Bradman made his first-class debut at the Adelaide Oval, aged 19. He secured the achievement of a hundred on debut, with an innings of 118 featuring what soon became his trademarks – fast footwork, calm confidence and rapid scoring. The ball used during this match was gifted to Clarrie Grimmett. In the final match of the season, he made his first century at the SCG, against the Sheffield Shield champions Victoria. Despite his potential, Bradman was not chosen for the Australian second team to tour New Zealand.

Bradman decided that his chances for Test selection would be improved by moving to Sydney for the 1928–29 season, when England were to tour in defence of the Ashes. Initially, he continued working in real estate, but later took a promotions job with the sporting goods retailer Mick Simmons Ltd. In the first match of the Sheffield Shield season, he scored a century in each innings against Queensland. He followed this with scores of 87 and 132 not out against the England touring team, and was rewarded with selection for the first Test, to be played at Brisbane.

== Test career ==
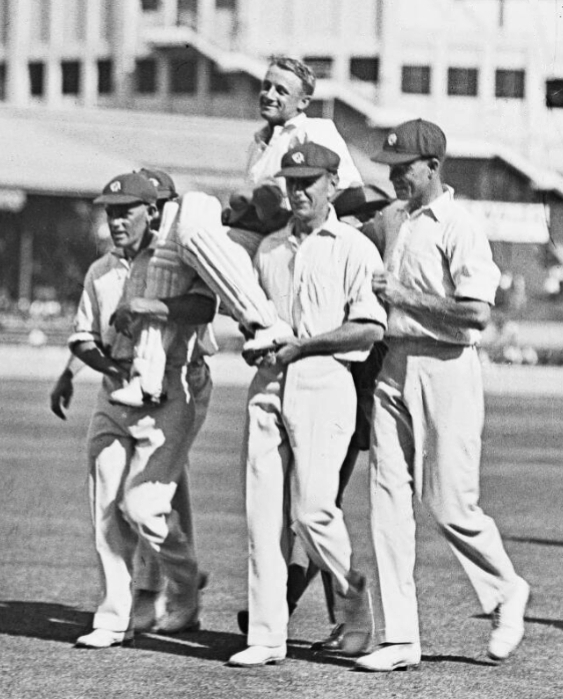
Bradman is chaired off the ground by his opponents after scoring 452.

At the age of 20, and playing in only his tenth first-class match, Bradman, nicknamed "Braddles" by his teammates, found his initial Test a harsh learning experience. Caught on a sticky wicket, Australia were all out for 66 in the second innings and lost by 675 runs (still a Test record). Following scores of 18 and 1, the selectors dropped Bradman to twelfth man for the Second Test. An injury to Bill Ponsford early in the match required Bradman to field as substitute while England amassed 636, following their 863 runs in the First Test. RS "Dick" Whitington wrote, "... he had scored only nineteen himself and these experiences appear to have provided him with food for thought". Recalled for the Third Test at the Melbourne Cricket Ground, Bradman scored 79 and 112 to become the youngest player to make a Test century, although the match was still lost. Another loss followed in the Fourth Test. Bradman reached 58 in the second innings and appeared set to guide the team to victory when he was run out. It was to be the only run out of his Test career. The losing margin was just twelve runs.

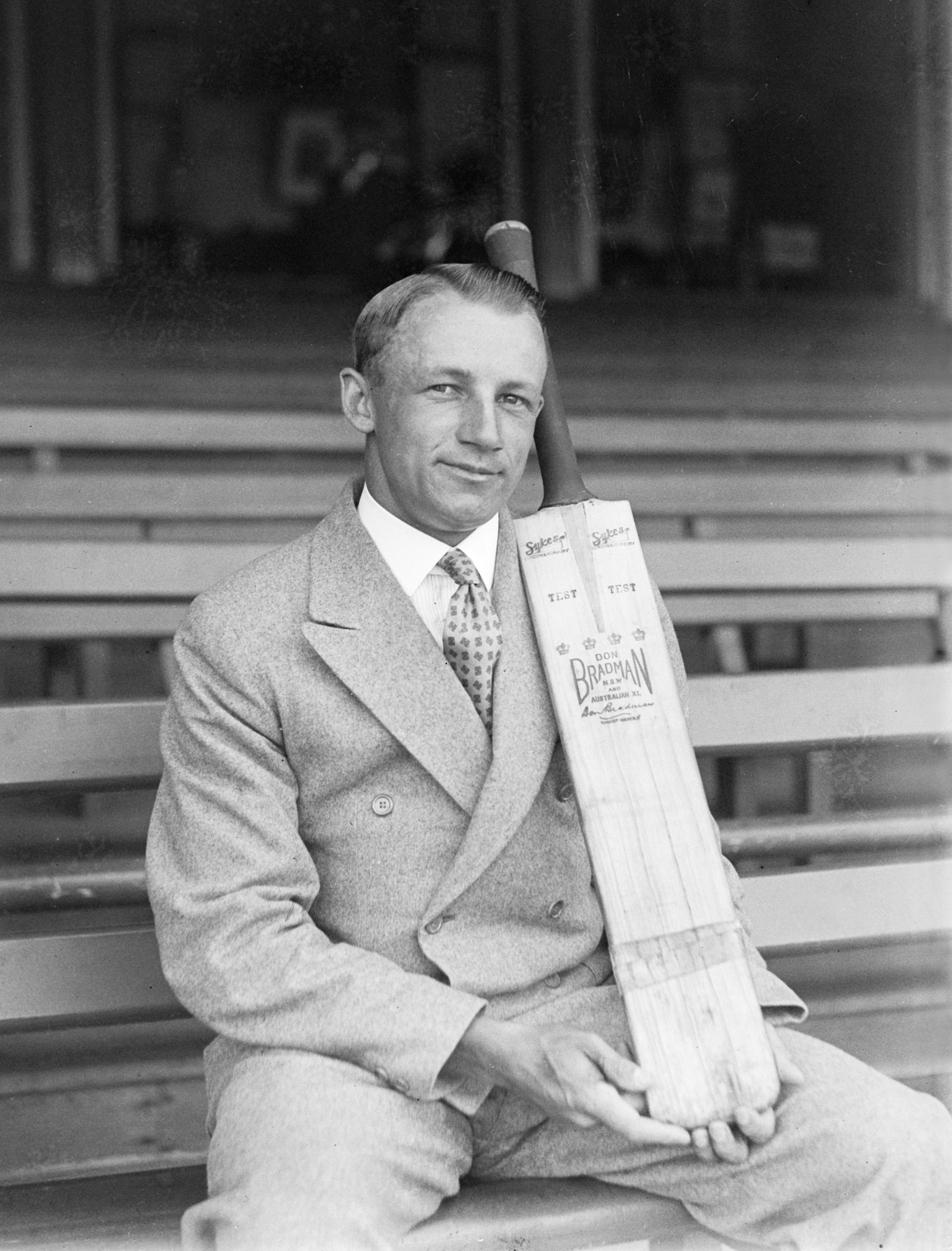
Bradman with his Wm. Sykes bat, in the early 1930s. The "Don Bradman Autograph" bat is still manufactured today by Sykes' successor company, Slazenger.

The improving Australians did manage to win the Fifth and final Test. Bradman top-scored with 123 in the first innings and was at the wicket in the second innings when his captain, Jack Ryder, hit the winning runs. Bradman completed the season with 1,690 first-class runs, averaging 93.88, and his first multiple century in a Sheffield Shield match, not out against Victoria, set a new ground record for the SCG. Bradman averaged 113.28 in 1929–30. In a trial match to select the team that would tour England, he was last man out in the first innings for 124. As his team followed on, the skipper Bill Woodfull asked Bradman to keep the pads on and open the second innings. By the end of play, he was 205 not out, on his way to 225. Against Queensland at the SCG, Bradman set a then world record for first-class cricket by scoring 452 not out; he made his runs in only 415 minutes. Not long after the feat, he recalled:

On 434 ... I had a curious intuition ... I seemed to sense that the ball would be a short-pitched one on the leg-stump, and I could almost feel myself getting ready to make my shot before the ball was delivered. Sure enough, it pitched exactly where I had anticipated, and, hooking it to the square-leg boundary, I established the only record upon which I had set my heart.

Although he was an obvious selection to tour England, Bradman's unorthodox style raised doubts that he could succeed on the slower English pitches. Percy Fender wrote:

... he will always be in the category of the brilliant, if unsound, ones. Promise there is in Bradman in plenty, though watching him does not inspire one with any confidence that he desires to take the only course which will lead him to a fulfilment of that promise. He makes a mistake, then makes it again and again; he does not correct it, or look as if he were trying to do so. He seems to live for the exuberance of the moment.

The encomiums were not confined to his batting gifts; nor did the criticism extend to his character. "Australia has unearthed a champion", said former Australian Test great Clem Hill, "self-taught, with natural ability. But most important of all, with his heart in the right place." Selector Dick Jones weighed in with the observation that it was "good to watch him talking to an old player, listening attentively to everything that is said and then replying with a modest 'thank you'."

=== 1930 tour of England ===
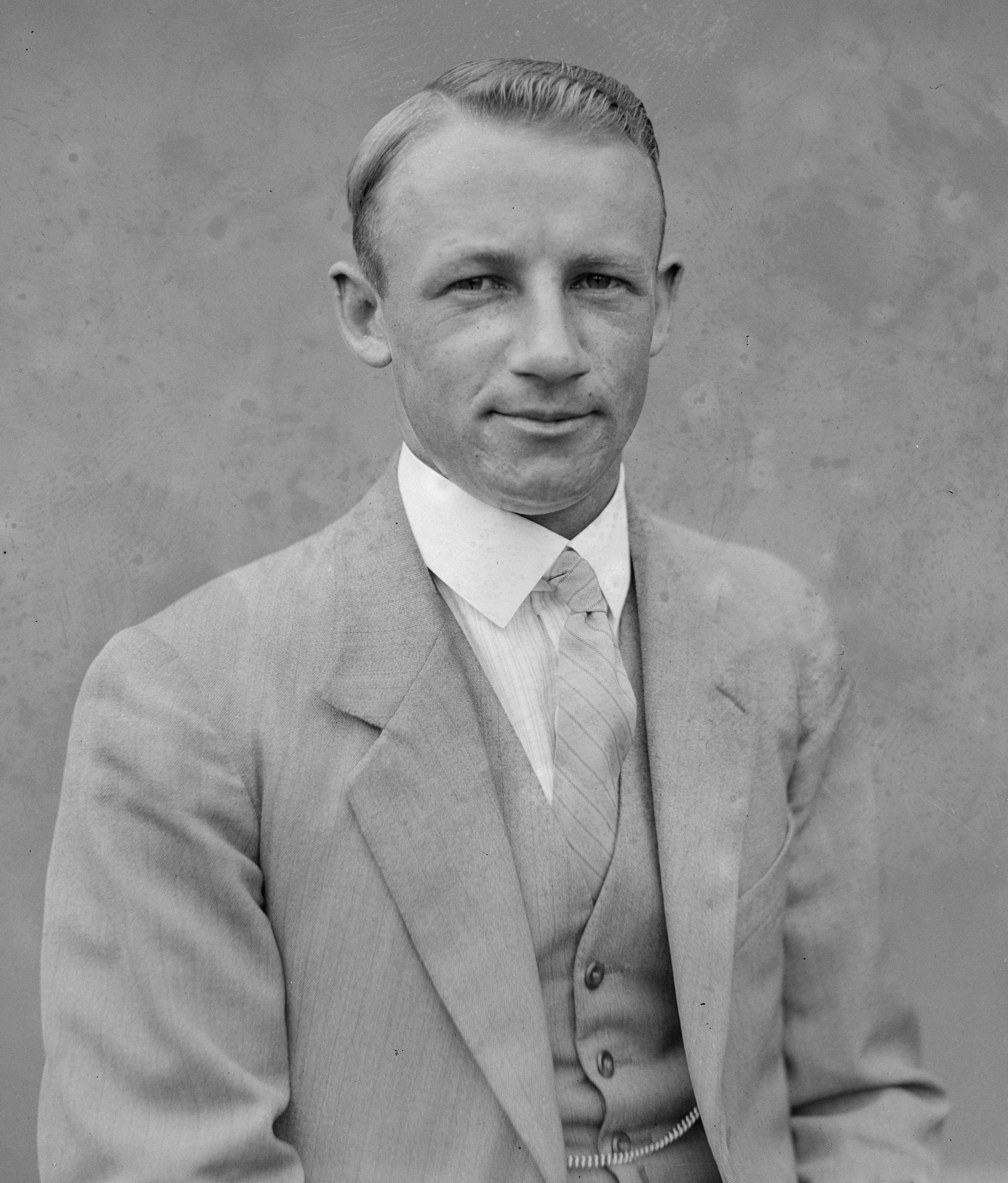
Portrait Donald Bradman, 1933–35, Sam Hood

England were favourites to win the 1930 Ashes series, and if the Australians were to exceed expectations their young batsmen, Bradman and Jackson, needed to prosper. With his elegant batting technique, Jackson appeared the brighter prospect of the pair. However, Bradman began the tour with 236 at Worcester and went on to score 1,000 first-class runs by the end of May, the fifth player (and first Australian) to achieve this rare feat. In his first Test appearance in England, Bradman hit 131 in the second innings but England won the match. His batting reached a new level in the Second Test at Lord's where he scored 254 as Australia won and levelled the series. Later in life, Bradman rated this the best innings of his career as "practically without exception every ball went where it was intended to go". Wisden noted Bradman's fast footwork and how he hit the ball "all round the wicket with power and accuracy", as well as faultless concentration in keeping the ball on the ground.

In terms of runs scored, this performance was soon surpassed. In the Third Test, at Headingley, Bradman scored a century before lunch on 11 July, the first day of the Test match to equal the performances of Victor Trumper and Charlie Macartney. In the afternoon, Bradman added another century between lunch and tea, before finishing the day on 309 not out. He remains the only Test player to pass 300 in one day's play. His eventual score of 334 was a world-record, exceeding the previous mark of 325 by Andy Sandham. Bradman dominated the Australian innings; the second-highest tally was 77 by Alan Kippax. Businessman Arthur Whitelaw later presented Bradman with a cheque for £1,000 in appreciation of his achievement. The match ended in anti-climax as poor weather prevented a result, as it also did in the Fourth Test.

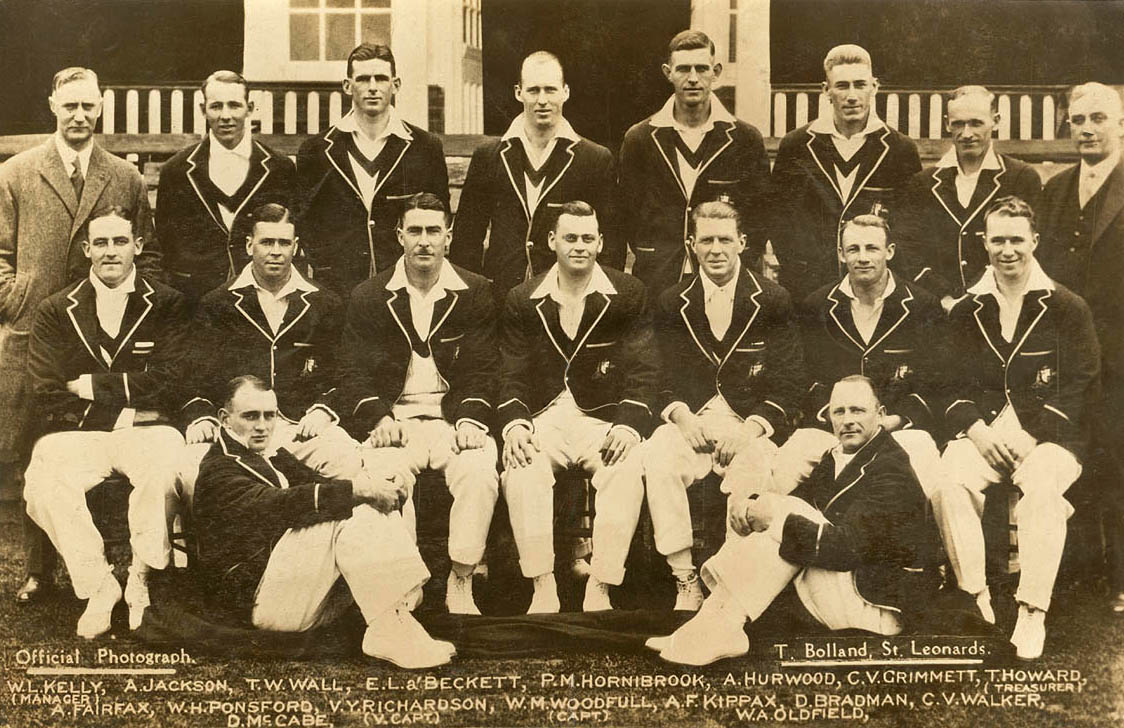
Bradman (second from the right, middle row) with the 1930 team

In the deciding Test at The Oval, England made 405. During an innings stretching over three days due to intermittent rain, Bradman made yet another multiple century, this time 232, which helped give Australia a big lead of 290 runs. In a crucial partnership with Jackson, Bradman battled through a difficult session when England fast bowler Harold Larwood bowled short on a pitch enlivened by the rain. Wisden gave this period of play only a passing mention:

On the Wednesday morning the ball flew about a good deal, both batsmen frequently being hit on the body ... on more than one occasion each player cocked the ball up dangerously but always, as it happened, just wide of the fieldsmen.

A number of English players and commentators noted Bradman's discomfort in playing the short, rising delivery. The revelation came too late for this particular match, but was to have immense significance in the next Ashes series. Australia won the match by an innings and regained the Ashes.

The victory made an impact in Australia. With the economy sliding toward depression and unemployment rapidly rising, the country found solace in sporting triumph. The story of a self-taught 22-year-old from the bush who set a series of records against the old rival made Bradman a national hero. The statistics he achieved on the tour, especially in the Test matches, broke records for the day and some have stood the test of time. In all, Bradman scored 974 runs at an average of 139.14 during the Test series, with four centuries, including two double hundreds and a triple. As of 2022, no-one has matched or exceeded 974 runs or three double centuries in one Test series; the record of 974 runs exceeds the second-best performance by 69 runs and was achieved in two fewer innings. Bradman's first-class tally, 2,960 runs (at an average of 98.66 with 10 centuries), was another enduring record: the most by any overseas batsman on a tour of England.

On the tour, the dynamic nature of Bradman's batting contrasted sharply with his quiet, solitary off-field demeanour. He was described as aloof from his teammates and he did not offer to buy them a round of drinks, let alone share the money given to him by Whitelaw. He spent a lot of his free time alone, writing, as he had sold the rights to a book. On his return to Australia, Bradman was surprised by the intensity of his reception; he became a "reluctant hero". Mick Simmons wanted to cash in on their employee's newly won fame, asking Bradman to leave his teammates and attend official receptions they organised in Adelaide, Melbourne, Goulburn, his hometown of Bowral and Sydney, where he received a brand new custom-built Chevrolet. At each stop, Bradman received a level of adulation that "embarrassed" him. This focus on individual accomplishment, in a team game, "... permanently damaged relationships with his contemporaries".

Commenting on Australia's victory, the team's vice-captain Vic Richardson said, "... we could have played any team without Bradman, but we could not have played the blind school without Clarrie Grimmett". A modest Bradman can be heard in a 1930 recording saying, "I have always endeavoured to do my best for the side, and the few centuries that have come my way have been achieved in the hope of winning matches. My one idea when going into bat was to make runs for Australia."

=== Reluctant hero ===
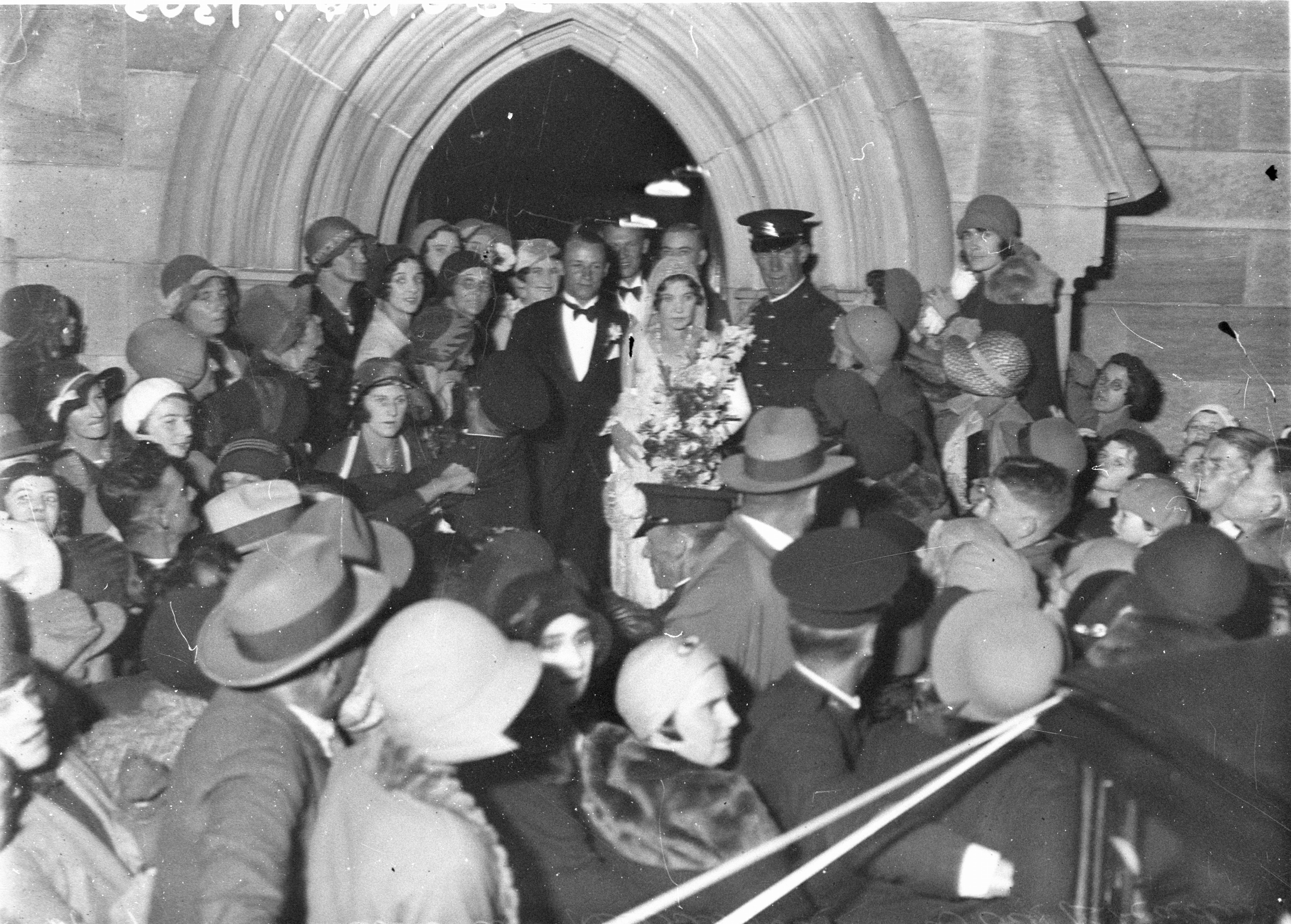
Hundreds of onlookers gather as the Bradmans leave the church after their wedding ceremony at St Paul's Church, Burwood, 30 April 1932.

In 1930–31, against the first West Indian side to visit Australia, Bradman's scoring was more sedate than in England – although he did make 223 in 297 minutes in the Third Test at Brisbane and 152 in 154 minutes in the following Test at Melbourne. However, he scored quickly in a very successful sequence of innings against South Africa in the Australian summer of 1931–32. For NSW against the tourists, he made 30, 135 and 219. In the Test matches, he scored 226 (277 minutes), 112 (155 minutes), 2 and 167 (183 minutes); his 299 not out in the Fourth Test, at Adelaide, set a new record for the highest score in a Test in Australia. Australia won nine of the ten Tests played over the two series.

At this point, Bradman had played fifteen Test matches since the beginning of 1930, scoring 2,227 runs at an average of 131. He had played eighteen innings, scoring ten centuries, six of which had extended beyond 200. His overall scoring rate was 42 runs per hour, with 856 (or 38.5% of his tally) scored in boundaries. Significantly, he had not hit a six, which typified Bradman's attitude: if he hit the ball along the ground, then it could not be caught. During this phase of his career, his youth and natural fitness allowed him to adopt a "machine-like" approach to batting. The South African fast bowler Sandy Bell described bowling to him as, "heart-breaking ... with his sort of cynical grin, which rather reminds one of the Sphinx ... he never seems to perspire".

Between these two seasons, Bradman seriously contemplated playing professional cricket in England with the Lancashire League club Accrington, a move that, according to the rules of the day, would have ended his Test career. A consortium of three Sydney businesses offered an alternative. They devised a two-year contract whereby Bradman wrote for Associated Newspapers, broadcast on Radio 2UE and promoted the menswear retailing chain FJ Palmer and Son. However, the contract increased Bradman's dependence on his public profile, making it more difficult to maintain the privacy that he ardently desired.

In a second-class fixture in November 1931, Bradman scored 100 off 22 balls in a three over spell in a match for Blackheath against Lithgow. Bradman's score of 256 included 14 sixes and 29 fours (notably hitting more sixes in this one innings than he hit in his entire first class career).

Bradman's chaotic wedding to Jessie Menzies in April 1932 epitomised these new and unwelcome intrusions into his private life. The church "was under siege all throughout the day ... uninvited guests stood on chairs and pews to get a better view"; police erected barriers that were broken down and many of those invited could not get a seat. Just weeks later, Bradman joined a private team organised by Arthur Mailey to tour the United States and Canada. He travelled with his wife, and the couple treated the trip as a honeymoon. Playing 51 games in 75 days, Bradman scored 3,779 runs at 102.1, with eighteen centuries. Although the standard of play was not high, the effects of the amount of cricket Bradman had played in the three previous years, together with the strains of his celebrity status, began to show on his return home.

=== Bodyline ===
"As long as Australia has Bradman she will be invincible ... It is almost time to request a legal limit on the number of runs Bradman should be allowed to make."

— News Chronicle, London

Within the Marylebone Cricket Club (MCC), which administered English cricket at the time, few voices were more influential than "Plum" Warner's, who, when considering England's response to Bradman, wrote that it "must evolve a new type of bowler and develop fresh ideas and strange tactics to curb his almost uncanny skill". To that end, Warner orchestrated the appointment of Douglas Jardine as England captain in 1931, as a prelude to Jardine leading the 1932–33 tour to Australia, with Warner as team manager. Remembering that Bradman had struggled against bouncers during his 232 at The Oval in 1930, Jardine decided to combine traditional leg theory with short-pitched bowling to combat Bradman. He settled on the Nottinghamshire fast bowlers Harold Larwood and Bill Voce as the spearheads for his tactics. In support, the England selectors chose another three pacemen for the squad. The unusually high number of fast bowlers caused a lot of comment in both countries and roused Bradman's own suspicions.

Bradman had other problems to deal with at this time; among these were bouts of illness from an undiagnosed malaise which had begun during the tour of North America, and that the Australian Board of Control had initially refused permission for him to write a column for the Sydney Sun newspaper. Bradman, who had signed a two-year contract with the Sun, threatened to withdraw from cricket to honour his contract when the board denied him permission to write; eventually, the paper released Bradman from the contract, in a victory for the board. In three first-class games against England before the Tests, Bradman averaged just 17.16 in six innings. Jardine decided to give the new tactics a trial in only one game, a fixture against an Australian XI at Melbourne. In this match, Bradman faced the leg theory and later warned local administrators that trouble was brewing if it continued. He withdrew from the First Test at the SCG amid rumours that he had suffered a nervous breakdown. Despite his absence, England employed what were already becoming known as the Bodyline tactics against the Australian batsmen and won an ill-tempered match.

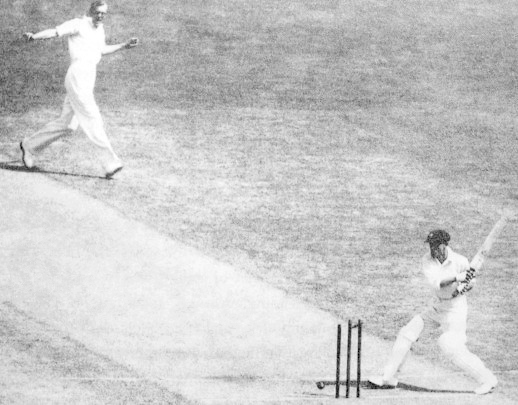
The famous duck: Bradman bowled by Bowes at the MCG, in front of a world record crowd assembled to see Bradman defeat Bodyline

The public clamoured for the return of Bradman to defeat Bodyline: "he was the batsman who could conquer this cankerous bowling ... 'Bradmania', amounting almost to religious fervour, demanded his return". Recovered from his indisposition, Bradman returned to the side in Kippax's position. A world record crowd of 63,993 at the MCG saw Bradman come to the crease on the first day of the Second Test with the score at 2/67. A standing ovation ensued that delayed play for several minutes. Bradman anticipated receiving a bouncer as his first ball and, as the bowler delivered, he moved across his stumps to play the hook shot. The ball failed to rise and Bradman dragged it onto his stumps; the first-ball duck was his first in a Test. The crowd fell into stunned silence as he walked off. However, Australia took a first innings lead in the match, and another record crowd on 2 January 1933 watched Bradman hit a counter-attacking second innings century. His unbeaten 103 (from 146 balls) in a team total of 191 helped set England a target of 251 to win. Bill O'Reilly and Bert Ironmonger bowled Australia to a series-levelling victory amid hopes that Bodyline was beaten.

The Third Test at the Adelaide Oval proved pivotal. There were angry crowd scenes after the Australian captain Bill Woodfull and wicket-keeper Bert Oldfield were hit by bouncers. An apologetic Warner entered the Australian dressing room and was rebuked by Woodfull. Woodfull's remarks (that "...there are two teams out there and only one of them is playing cricket") were leaked to the press, and Warner and others attributed this to Australian opening batsman Jack Fingleton; however, for many years (even after Fingleton's death) a bitter war of accusation passed between Fingleton and Bradman as to who was the real source of the leak. In a cable to the MCC, the Australian Board of Control repeated the allegation of poor sportsmanship directed at Warner by Woodfull.

With the support of the MCC, England continued with Bodyline despite Australian protests. The tourists won the last three Tests convincingly and regained the Ashes. Bradman caused controversy with his own tactics. Always seeking to score, and with the leg side packed with fielders, he often backed away and hit the ball into the vacant half of the outfield with unorthodox shots reminiscent of tennis or golf. This brought him 396 runs (at 56.57) for the series and plaudits for attempting to find a solution to Bodyline, although his series average was just 57% of his career mean. Fingleton was in no doubt that Bradman's game altered irrevocably as a consequence of Bodyline, writing:

Bodyline was specially prepared, nurtured for and expended on him and, in consequence, his technique underwent a change quicker than might have been the case with the passage of time. Bodyline plucked something vibrant from his art.

The constant glare of celebrity and the tribulations of the season forced Bradman to reappraise his life outside the game and to seek a career away from his cricketing fame. Harry Hodgetts, a South Australian delegate to the Board of Control, offered Bradman work as a stockbroker if he would relocate to Adelaide and captain the South Australia team (SA). Unknown to the public, the SA Cricket Association (SACA) instigated Hodgetts' approach and subsidised Bradman's wage. Although his wife was hesitant about moving, Bradman eventually agreed to the deal in February 1934.

=== Declining health and a brush with death ===
In his farewell season for NSW, Bradman averaged 132.44, his best yet. He was appointed vice-captain for the 1934 tour of England. However, "he was unwell for much of the [English] summer, and reports in newspapers hinted that he was suffering from heart trouble". Although he again started with a double century at Worcester, his famed concentration soon deserted him. Wisden wrote:

...there were many occasions on which he was out to wild strokes. Indeed at one period he created the impression that, to some extent, he had lost control of himself and went in to bat with an almost complete disregard for anything in the shape of a defensive stroke.

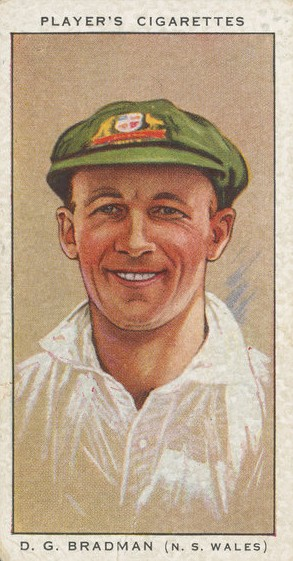
Cigarette card distributed during the 1934 Ashes series

At one stage, Bradman went thirteen first-class innings without a century, the longest such spell of his career, prompting suggestions that Bodyline had eroded his confidence and altered his technique. After three Tests, the series was locked up 1–1, and Bradman had scored 133 runs in five innings. The Australians travelled to Sheffield and played a warm-up game before the Fourth Test. Bradman started slowly and then, "...the old Bradman [was] back with us, in the twinkling of an eye, almost". He went on to make 140, with the last 90 runs coming in just 45 minutes. On the opening day of the Fourth Test at Headingley (Leeds), England were out for 200, but Australia slumped to 3/39, losing the third wicket from the last ball of the day. Listed to bat at number five, Bradman would start his innings the next day.

That evening, Bradman declined an invitation to dinner from Neville Cardus, telling the journalist that he wanted an early night because the team needed him to make a double century the next day. Cardus pointed out that his previous innings on the ground was 334, and the law of averages was against another such score. Bradman told Cardus, "I don't believe in the law of averages". In the event, Bradman batted all of the second day and into the third, putting on a then world record partnership of 388 with Bill Ponsford. When he was finally out for 304 (473 balls, 43 fours and two sixes), Australia had a lead of 350 runs, but rain prevented them from forcing a victory. The effort of the lengthy innings stretched Bradman's reserves of energy, and he did not play again until the Fifth Test at The Oval, the match that would decide the Ashes.

In the first innings at The Oval, Bradman and Ponsford recorded an even more massive partnership, this time 451 runs. It had taken them less than a month to break the record they had set at Headingley; this new world record was to last 57 years. Bradman's share of the stand was 244 from 271 balls, and the Australian total of 701 set up victory by 562 runs. For the fourth time in five series, the Ashes changed hands. England would not recover them again until after Bradman's retirement.

Seemingly restored to full health, Bradman blazed two centuries in the last two games of the tour. However, when he returned to London to prepare for the trip home, he experienced severe abdominal pain. It took a doctor more than 24 hours to diagnose acute appendicitis and a surgeon operated immediately. Bradman lost a lot of blood during the four-hour procedure and peritonitis set in. Penicillin and sulphonamides were still experimental treatments at this time; peritonitis was usually a fatal condition. On 25 September, the hospital issued a statement that Bradman was struggling for his life and that blood donors were needed urgently.

"The effect of the announcement was little short of spectacular". The hospital could not deal with the number of donors and closed its switchboard in the face of the avalanche of telephone calls generated by the news. Journalists were asked by their editors to prepare obituaries. O'Reilly took a call from King George V's secretary asking that the King be kept informed of the situation. Bradman's wife started the month-long journey to London as soon as she received the news. En route, she heard a rumour that her husband had died. A telephone call clarified the situation and by the time she reached London, Bradman had begun a slow recovery. He followed medical advice to convalesce, taking several months to return to Australia and missing the 1934–35 Australian season.

=== Internal politics and the Test captaincy ===
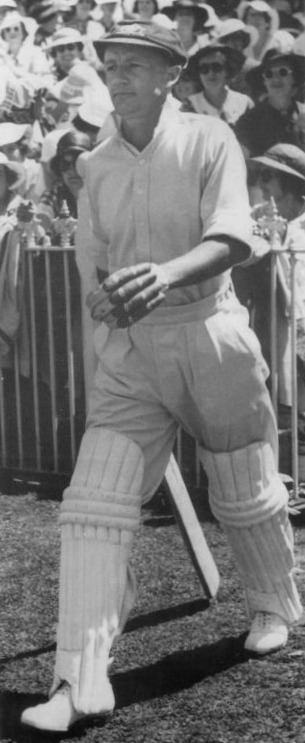
Bradman walking out to bat in the Third Test against England at the Melbourne Cricket Ground in 1937. His 270 runs won the match for Australia and has been rated the greatest innings of all time.

There was off-field intrigue in Australian cricket during the antipodean winter of 1935. Australia, scheduled to make a tour of South Africa at the end of the year, needed to replace the retired Woodfull as captain. The Board of Control wanted Bradman to lead the team, yet, on 8 August, the board announced his withdrawal from the team due to a lack of fitness. Surprisingly, in the light of this announcement, Bradman led the South Australian team in a full programme of matches that season.

The captaincy was given to Vic Richardson, Bradman's predecessor as South Australian captain. Cricket author Chris Harte's analysis of the situation is that a prior (unspecified) commercial agreement forced Bradman to remain in Australia. Harte attributed an ulterior motive to his relocation: the off-field behaviour of Richardson and other South Australian players had displeased the SACA, which was looking for new leadership. To help improve discipline, Bradman became a committeeman of the SACA, and a selector of the South Australian and Australian teams. He took his adopted state to its first Sheffield Shield title for ten years, Bradman weighing in with personal contributions of 233 against Queensland and 357 against Victoria. He finished the season with 369 (in 233 minutes), a South Australian record, made against Tasmania. The bowler who dismissed him, Reginald Townley, would later become leader of the Tasmanian Liberal Party.

Australia defeated South Africa 4–0 and senior players such as O'Reilly were pointed in their comments about the enjoyment of playing under Richardson's captaincy. A group of players who were openly hostile toward Bradman formed during the tour. For some, the prospect of playing under Bradman was daunting, as was the knowledge that he would additionally be sitting in judgement of their abilities in his role as a selector.

To start the new season, the Test side played a "Rest of Australia" team, captained by Bradman, at Sydney in early October 1936. The Test XI suffered a big defeat, due to Bradman's 212 and a haul of 12 wickets taken by leg-spinner Frank Ward. Bradman let the members of the Test team know that despite their recent success, the team still required improvement. Shortly afterwards, his first child was born on 28 October, but died the next day. He took time out of cricket for two weeks and on his return made 192 in three hours against Victoria in the last match before the beginning of the Ashes series.

The Test selectors made five changes to the team who had played in the previous Test match. Significantly, Australia's most successful bowler, Clarrie Grimmett, was replaced by Ward, one of four players making their debut. Bradman's role in Grimmett's omission from the team was controversial and it became a theme that dogged Bradman as Grimmett continued to be prolific in domestic cricket while his successors were ineffective – he was regarded as having finished the veteran bowler's Test career in a political purge.

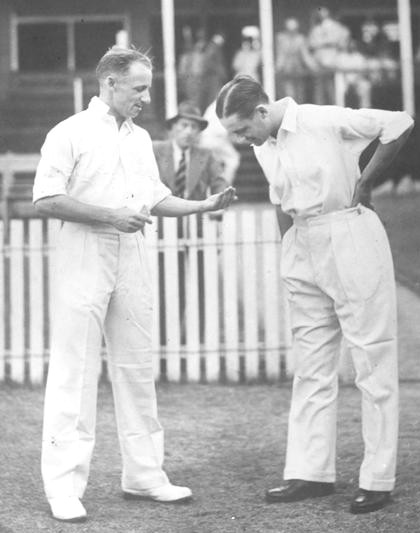
Bradman and England captain Gubby Allen toss at the start of the 1936–37 Ashes series. The five Tests drew more than 950,000 spectators including a world record 350,534 to the Third Test at Melbourne.

Australia fell to successive defeats in the opening two Tests, Bradman making two ducks in his four innings, and it seemed that the captaincy was affecting his form. The selectors made another four changes to the team for the Third Test at Melbourne.

Bradman won the toss on New Year's Day 1937, but again failed with the bat, scoring just 13. The Australians could not take advantage of a pitch that favoured batting, and finished the day at 6/181. On the second day, rain dramatically altered the course of the game. With the sun drying the pitch (in those days, covers could not be used during matches) Bradman declared to get England in to bat while the pitch was "sticky"; England also declared to get Australia back in, conceding a lead of 124. Bradman countered by reversing his batting order to protect his run-makers while conditions improved. The ploy worked and Bradman went in at number seven. In an innings spread over three days, he battled influenza while scoring 270 off 375 balls, sharing a record partnership of 346 with Jack Fingleton, and Australia went on to victory. In 2001, Wisden rated this performance as the best Test match innings of all time.

The next Test, at the Adelaide Oval, was fairly even until Bradman played another patient second innings, making 212 from 395 balls. Australia levelled the series when the erratic left-arm spinner "Chuck" Fleetwood-Smith bowled Australia to victory. In the series-deciding Fifth Test, Bradman returned to a more aggressive style in top-scoring with 169 (off 191 balls) in Australia's 604 and Australia won by an innings. Australia's achievement of winning a Test series after outright losses in the first two matches has never been repeated in Test cricket.

=== End of an era ===
During the 1938 tour of England, Bradman played the most consistent cricket of his career. He needed to score heavily as England had a strengthened batting line-up, while the Australian bowling was over-reliant on O'Reilly. Grimmett was overlooked, but Jack Fingleton made the team, so the clique of anti-Bradman players remained. Playing 26 innings on tour, Bradman recorded 13 centuries (a new Australian record) and again made 1,000 first-class runs before the end of May, becoming the only player to do so twice. In scoring 2,429 runs, Bradman achieved the highest average ever recorded in an English season: 115.66.

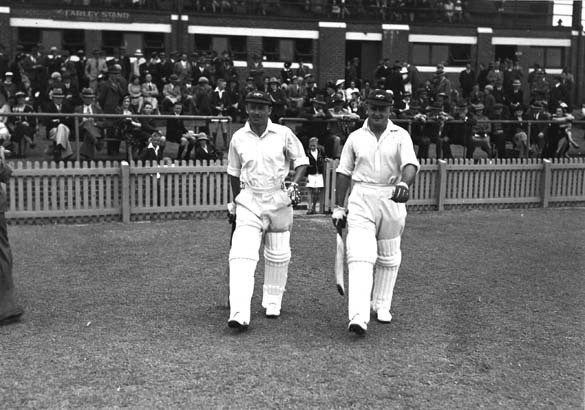
Bradman (left, with his vice-captain Stan McCabe) walks out to bat at Perth, during a preliminary match to the 1938 tour of England. Bradman scored 102.

In the First Test, England amassed a big first innings score and looked likely to win, but Stan McCabe made 232 for Australia, a performance Bradman rated as the best he had ever seen. With Australia forced to follow-on, Bradman fought hard to ensure McCabe's effort was not in vain, and he secured the draw with 144 not out. It was the slowest Test hundred of his career and he played a similar innings of 102 not out in the next Test as Australia struggled to another draw. Rain completely washed out the Third Test at Old Trafford.

Australia's opportunity came at Headingley, a Test described by Bradman as the best he ever played in. England batted first and made 223. During the Australian innings, Bradman backed himself by opting to bat on in poor light conditions, reasoning that Australia could score more runs in bad light on a good pitch than on a rain affected pitch in good light, when he had the option to go off. He scored 103 out of a total of 242 and the gamble paid off, as it meant there was sufficient time to push for victory when an England collapse left them a target of only 107 to win. Australia slumped to 4/61, with Bradman out for 16. An approaching storm threatened to wash the game out, but the poor weather held off and Australia managed to secure the win, a victory that retained the Ashes. For the only time in his life, the tension of the occasion got to Bradman and he could not watch the closing stages of play, a reflection of the pressure that he felt all tour: he described the captaincy as "exhausting" and said he "found it difficult to keep going".

The euphoria of securing the Ashes preceded Australia's heaviest defeat. At The Oval, England amassed a world record of 7/903 and their opening batsman Len Hutton scored an individual world record, by making 364. In an attempt to relieve the burden on his bowlers, Bradman took a rare turn at bowling. During his third over, he fractured his ankle and teammates carried him from the ground. With Bradman injured and Fingleton unable to bat because of a leg muscle strain, Australia were thrashed by an innings and 579 runs, which remains the largest margin in Test cricket history. Unfit to complete the tour, Bradman left the team in the hands of vice-captain Stan McCabe. At this point, Bradman felt that the burden of captaincy would prevent him from touring England again, although he did not make his doubts public.

Despite the pressure of captaincy, Bradman's batting form remained supreme. An experienced, mature player now commonly called "the Don" had replaced the blitzing style of his early days as the "Boy from Bowral". In 1938–39, he led South Australia to the Sheffield Shield and made a century in six consecutive innings to equal CB Fry's world record. Bradman totalled 21 first-class centuries in 34 innings, from the beginning of the 1938 tour of England (including preliminary games in Australia) until early 1939.

The next season, Bradman made an abortive bid to join the Victoria state side. The Melbourne Cricket Club advertised the position of club secretary and he was led to believe that if he applied, he would get the job. The position, which had been held by Hugh Trumble until his death in August 1938, was one of the most prestigious jobs in Australian cricket. The annual salary of £1,000 would make Bradman financially secure while allowing him to retain a connection with the game. On 18 January 1939, the club's committee, on the casting vote of the chairman, chose former Test batsman Vernon Ransford over Bradman.

In August 1939, Bradman won the South Australian squash championships, beating Australian Davis Cup tennis player Don Turnbull in the final. Turnbull won the first two games in the best-of-five game contest and led 8–3 in the third game with five match points, but Bradman won the game and the fourth. Turnbull led 8–5 in the fifth game but Bradman went on to win.

The 1939–40 season was Bradman's most productive ever for SA: 1,448 runs at an average of 144.8. He made three double centuries, including 251 not out against NSW, the innings that he rated the best he ever played in the Sheffield Shield, as he tamed Bill O'Reilly at the height of his form. However, it was the end of an era. The outbreak of World War II led to the indefinite postponement of all cricket tours, and the suspension of the Sheffield Shield competition.

=== Troubled war years ===
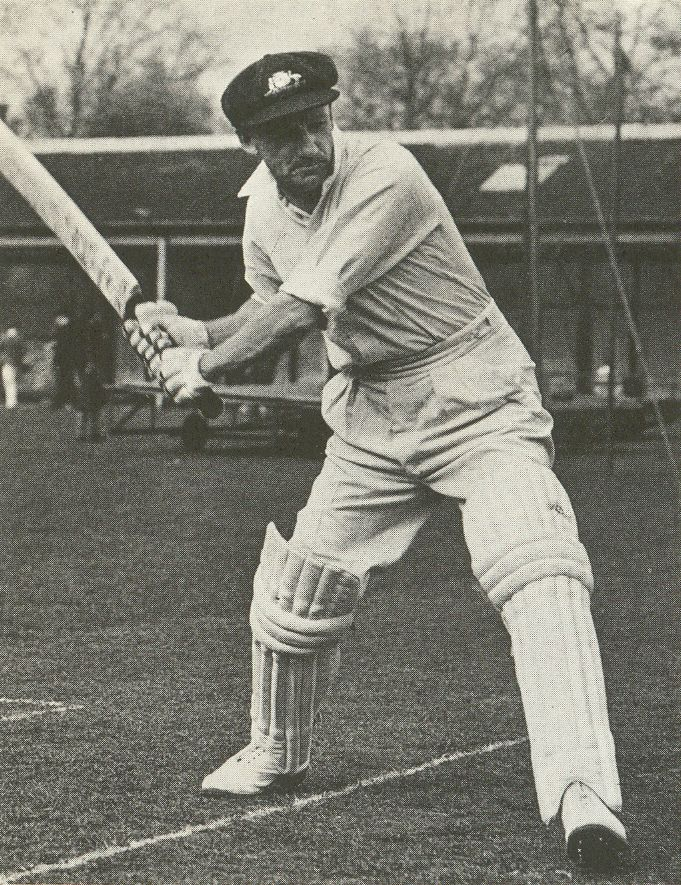
Bradman's high backlift and lengthy forward stride were characteristic.

Bradman joined the Royal Australian Air Force (RAAF) on 28 June 1940 and was passed fit for air crew duty. The RAAF had more recruits than it could equip and train and Bradman spent four months in Adelaide before the Governor-General of Australia, Lord Gowrie, persuaded Bradman to transfer to the army, a move that was criticised as a safer option for him. Surprisingly, in light of his batting prowess, a routine army test revealed that Bradman had poor eyesight.

Given the rank of lieutenant, Bradman was posted to the Army School of Physical Training at Frankston, Victoria, to act as a divisional supervisor of physical training. The exertion of the job aggravated his chronic muscular problems, diagnosed as fibrositis, an early term for fibromyalgia. Invalided out of service in June 1941, Bradman spent months recuperating, unable even to shave himself or comb his hair due to the extent of the muscular pain he suffered. He resumed stockbroking during 1942. In his biography of Bradman, Charles Williams expounded the theory that the physical problems were psychosomatic, induced by stress and possibly depression; Bradman read the book's manuscript and did not disagree. Had any cricket been played at this time, he would not have been available. Although he found some relief in 1945 when referred to the Melbourne masseur Ern Saunders, Bradman permanently lost the feeling in the thumb and index finger of his (dominant) right hand.

In June 1945, Bradman faced a financial crisis when the firm of Harry Hodgetts collapsed due to fraud and embezzlement. Bradman moved quickly to set up his own business, utilising Hodgetts' client list and his old office in Grenfell Street, Adelaide. The fallout led to a prison term for Hodgetts, and left a stigma attached to Bradman's name in the city's business community for many years.

However, the SA Cricket Association had no hesitation in appointing Bradman as their delegate to the Board of Control in place of Hodgetts. Now working alongside some of the men he had battled in the 1930s, Bradman quickly became a leading light in the administration of the game. With the resumption of international cricket, he was once more appointed a Test selector, and played a major role in planning for post-war cricket.

=== "The ghost of a once-great cricketer" ===
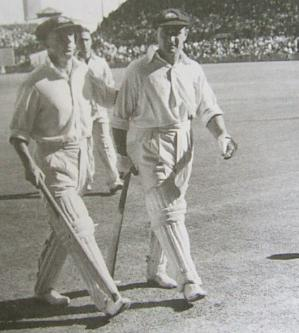
Bradman and Barnes leave the field for an adjournment as both head towards 234.

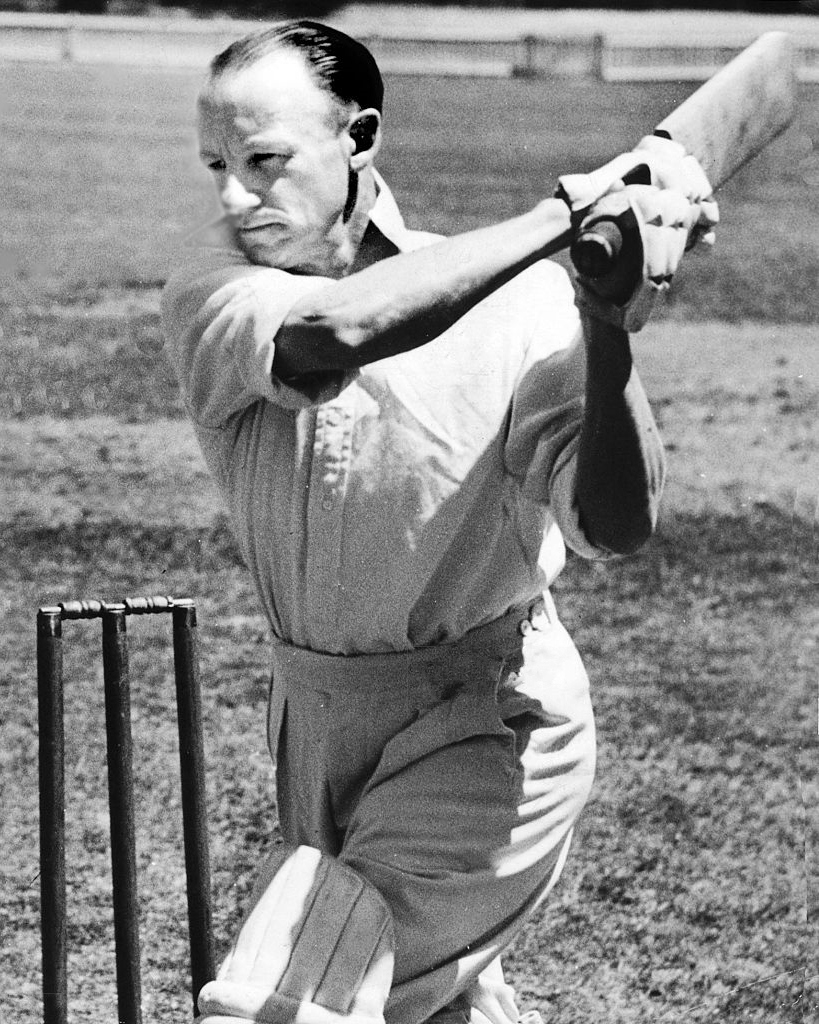
Bradman during an interstate series at Adelaide Oval, 31 October 1946

In 1945–46, Bradman suffered regular bouts of fibrositis while coming to terms with increased administrative duties and the establishment of his business. He played for South Australia in two matches to help with the re-establishment of first-class cricket and later described his batting as "painstaking". Batting against the Australian Services cricket team, Bradman scored 112 in less than two hours, yet Dick Whitington (playing for the Services) wrote, "I have seen today the ghost of a once-great cricketer". Bradman declined a tour of New Zealand and spent the winter of 1946 wondering whether he had played his last match. "With the English team due to arrive for the 1946–47 Ashes series, the media and the public were anxious to know if Bradman would lead Australia." His doctor recommended against a return to the game. Encouraged by his wife, Bradman agreed to play in lead-up fixtures to the Test series. After hitting two centuries, Bradman made himself available for the First Test at The Gabba.

Controversy emerged on the first day of the First Test at Brisbane. After compiling an uneasy 28 runs, Bradman hit a ball to the gully fieldsman, Jack Ikin. "An appeal for a catch was denied in the umpire's contentious ruling that it was a bump ball". At the end of the over, England captain Wally Hammond spoke with Bradman and criticised him for not "walking"; "from then on the series was a cricketing war just when most people desired peace", Whitington wrote. Bradman regained his finest pre-war form in making 187, followed by 234 during the Second Test at Sydney (Sid Barnes also scored 234 during the innings, many in a still-standing record 405-run 5th-wicket partnership with Bradman. Barnes later recalled that he purposely got out on 234 because "it wouldn't be right for someone to make more runs than Bradman"). Australia won both matches by an innings. Jack Fingleton speculated that had the decision at Brisbane gone against him, Bradman would have retired, such were his fitness problems. In the remainder of the series, Bradman made three half-centuries in six innings, but he was unable to make another century; nevertheless, his team won handsomely, scoring 3–0. He was the leading batsman on either side, with an average of 97.14. Nearly 850,000 spectators watched the Tests, which helped lift public spirits after the war.

=== Century of centuries and "the Invincibles" ===
India made its first tour of Australia in the 1947–48 season. On 15 November, Bradman made 172 against them for an Australian XI at Sydney, his 100th first-class century. The first non-Englishman to achieve the milestone, Bradman remains the only Australian to have done so. In five Tests, he scored 715 runs (at 178.75 average). His last double century (201) came at Adelaide, and he scored a century in each innings of the Melbourne Test. On the eve of the Fifth Test, he announced that the match would be his last in Australia, although he would tour England as a farewell.

Australia had assembled one of the great teams of cricket history. Bradman made it known that he wanted to go through the tour unbeaten, a feat never before accomplished. English spectators were drawn to the matches knowing that it would be their last opportunity to see Bradman in action. RC Robertson-Glasgow observed of Bradman that:

Next to Mr. Winston Churchill, he was the most celebrated man in England during the summer of 1948. His appearances throughout the country were like one continuous farewell matinée. At last his batting showed human fallibility. Often, especially at the start of the innings, he played where the ball wasn't, and spectators rubbed their eyes.

Despite his waning powers, Bradman compiled 11 centuries on the tour, amassing 2,428 runs (average 89.92). His highest score of the tour (187) came against Essex, when Australia compiled a world record of 721 runs in a day. In the Tests, he scored a century at Trent Bridge, but the performance most like his pre-war exploits came in the Fourth Test at Headingley. England declared on the last morning of the game, setting Australia a world record 404 runs to win in only 345 minutes on a heavily worn pitch. In partnership with Arthur Morris (182), Bradman reeled off 173 not out and the match was won with 15 minutes to spare. The journalist Ray Robinson called the victory "the 'finest ever' in its conquest of seemingly insuperable odds".

In the final Test at The Oval, Bradman walked out to bat in Australia's first innings. He received a standing ovation from the crowd and three cheers from the opposition. His Test batting average stood at 101.39. Facing the wrist-spin of Eric Hollies, Bradman pushed forward to the second ball that he faced, was deceived by a googly, and was bowled between bat and pad for a duck. An England batting collapse resulted in an innings defeat, denying Bradman the opportunity to bat again and so his career average finished at 99.94; if he had scored just four runs in his last innings, it would have been 100. A story developed over the years that claimed Bradman missed the ball because of tears in his eyes, a claim Bradman denied for the rest of his life.

The Australian team won the Ashes 4–0, completed the tour unbeaten, and entered history as "The Invincibles". Just as Bradman's legend grew, rather than diminished, over the years, so too has the reputation of the 1948 team. For Bradman, it was the most personally fulfilling period of his playing days, as the divisiveness of the 1930s had passed. He wrote:

Knowing the personnel, I was confident that here at last was the great opportunity which I had longed for. A team of cricketers whose respect and loyalty were unquestioned, who would regard me in a fatherly sense and listen to my advice, follow my guidance and not question my handling of affairs...there are no longer any fears that they will query the wisdom of what you do. The result is a sense of freedom to give full reign to your own creative ability and personal judgment.

With Bradman now retired from professional cricket, RC Robertson-Glasgow wrote of the English reaction "... a miracle has been removed from among us. So must ancient Italy have felt when she heard of the death of Hannibal".

== Statistical summary ==
=== Test match performance ===
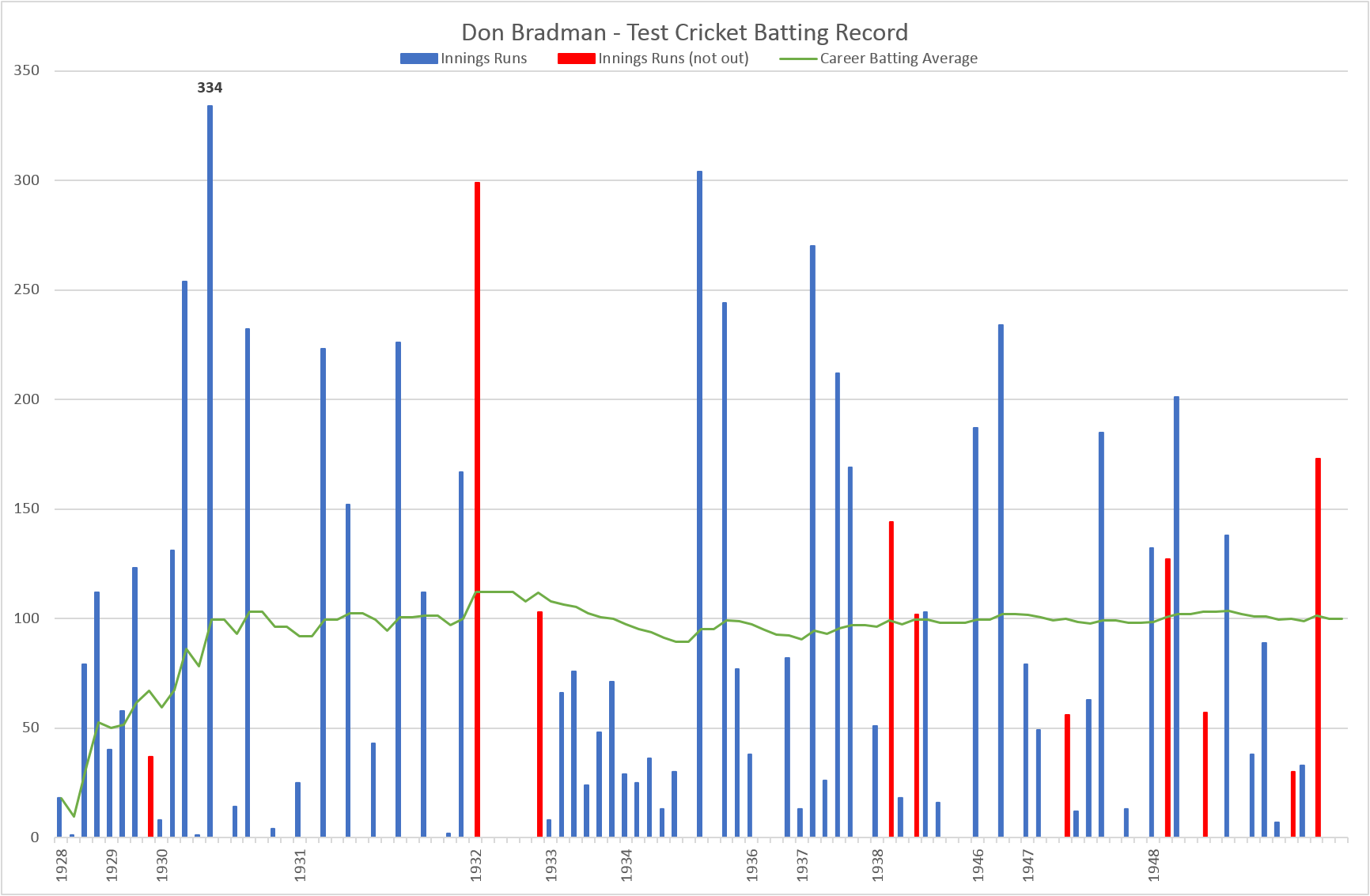
This is the complete graphical representation of the test cricket record of Don Bradman. Individual innings are represented by the blue and red (not out) bars; the green line is his career batting average.

		Batting				Bowling			
Opposition	Matches	Runs	Average	High Score	100 / 50	Runs	Wickets	Average	Best (Inns)
England	37	5,028	89.78	334	19/12	51	1	51.00	1/23
India	5	715	178.75	201	4/1	4	0	–	–
South Africa	5	806	201.50	299*	4/0	2	0	–	–
West Indies	5	447	74.50	223	2/0	15	1	15.00	1/8
Overall	52	6,996	99.94	334	29/13	72	2	36.00	1/8

=== First-class performance ===
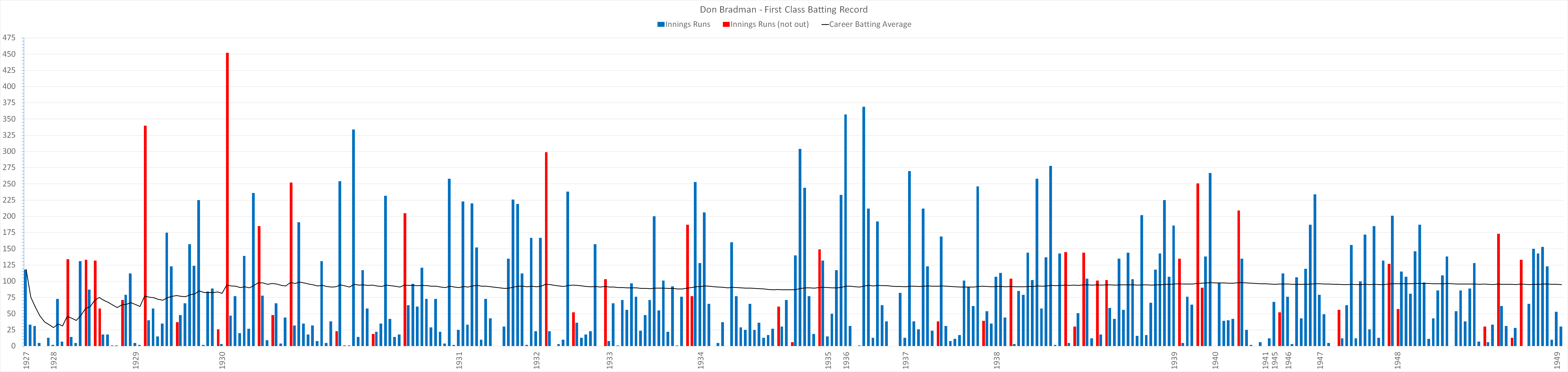
This is the complete graphical representation of the first-class cricket record of Don Bradman. Individual innings are represented by the blue and red (not out) bars; the black line is his career batting average.

	Innings	Not Out	Highest	Aggregate	Average	100s	100s/inns
Ashes Tests	63	7	334	5,028	89.78	19	30.2%
All Tests	80	10	334	6,996	99.94	29	36.3%
Sheffield Shield	96	15	452*	8,926	110.19	36	37.5%
All First Class	338	43	452*	28,067	95.14	117	34.6%
Grade	93	17	303	6,598	86.80	28	30.1%
All Second Class	331	64	320*	22,664	84.80	94	28.4%
Grand Total	669	107	452*	50,731	90.27	211	31.5%
Statistics from Bradman Museum.

=== Test records ===
Bradman still holds the following significant records for Test match cricket:

==== Batting average ====
- Highest career batting average (minimum 3 innings): 99.94
- Highest series batting average (minimum 4-Test series): 201.50 (1931–32); also second-highest: 178.75 (1947–48)

==== Conversion rate ====
- Highest percentage of centuries per innings played: 36.25% (29 centuries from 80 innings)
- Highest percentage of double centuries per innings played: 15% (12 double centuries from 80 innings)
- Highest 50/100 conversion rate (minimum 2000 runs): 69.05% (29 centuries converted from 42 innings of ≥ 50 runs)
- Highest 100/200 conversion rate (minimum 2000 runs): 41.38% (12 double centuries converted from 29 innings of ≥ 100 runs)

==== Multiples of 100 runs ====
- Most double centuries: 12
- Most double centuries in a series: 3 (1930); also 2 (1931–32, 1934, 1936–37)
- Most triple centuries: 2 (equal with Chris Gayle, Brian Lara and Virender Sehwag) Note: Bradman was stranded on 299* in the 4th Test against South Africa in 1932.

==== Scoring rate ====
- Most centuries accumulated within single sessions of play: 6 (1 pre lunch, 2 lunch-tea, 3 tea-stumps)
- Most runs in one day's play: 309 (1930)

==== Fastest to multiples of 1000 runs ====
- Fewest matches required to reach 1000 (7 matches), 2000 (15 matches), 3000 (23 matches), 4000 (31 matches), 5000 (36 matches) and 6000 (45 matches) Test runs.
- Fewest innings required to reach 2000 (22 innings), 3000 (33 innings), 4000 (48 innings), 5000 (56 innings) and 6000 (68 innings) Test runs.

==== Other ====
- Highest peak Test batting rating: 961
- Highest percentage of team runs over career: 24.28%
- Highest 5th wicket partnership: 405 (with Sid Barnes, 1946–47)
- Highest score by a number 7 batsman: 270 (1936–37)
- Most runs against one opponent: 5,028 (England)
- Most hundreds against one opponent: 19 (England)
- Most runs in one series: 974 (1930)
- Most consecutive matches in which he made a century: 6 (the last three Tests in 1936–37, and the first three Tests in 1938)

=== Cricket context ===
Completed Test career batting averages
Don Bradman (AUS)	99.94
Adam Voges (AUS)	61.87
Graeme Pollock (RSA)	60.97
George Headley (WI)	60.83
Herbert Sutcliffe (ENG)	60.73
Eddie Paynter (ENG)	59.23
Ken Barrington (ENG)	58.67
Everton Weekes (WI)	58.61
Wally Hammond (ENG)	58.45
Garfield Sobers (WI)	57.78
Source: Cricinfo; Qualification: 20 completed innings, career completed.

Bradman's Test batting average of 99.94 has become one of cricket's most famous, iconic statistics. No other player who has played more than 20 Test match innings has finished their career with a Test average of more than 62. Bradman scored centuries at a rate better than one every three innings – in 80 Test innings, Bradman scored 29 centuries. Only 11 players have since surpassed his total, all at a much slower rate: the next fastest player to reach 29 centuries, Sachin Tendulkar, required nearly twice as long (148 innings) to do so.

In addition, Bradman's total of 12 Test double hundreds – constituting 15% of his innings – remains the most achieved by any Test batsman and was accumulated faster than any other player's total. For comparison, the next-highest totals of Test double hundreds are Kumar Sangakkara's 11 in 223 innings (4.9%), Brian Lara's 9 in 232 innings (3.9%), and Wally Hammond's 7 in 140 innings (5%); the next-highest rate of scoring Test double centuries was achieved by Vinod Kambli, whose 21 innings included 2 double centuries (9.5%).

=== World sport context ===
Wisden hailed Bradman as "the greatest phenomenon in the history of cricket, indeed in the history of all ball games". Statistician Charles Davis analysed the statistics for several prominent sportsmen by comparing the number of standard deviations that they stand above the mean for their sport. The top performers in his selected sports are:

Athlete	Sport	Statistic	Standard deviations
Bradman	Cricket	Batting average	4.4
Pelé	Association football	Goals per game	3.7
Ty Cobb	Baseball	Batting average	3.6
Jack Nicklaus	Golf	Major titles	3.5
Michael Jordan	Basketball	Points per game	3.4

The statistics show that "no other athlete dominates an international sport to the extent that Bradman does cricket". In order to post a similarly dominant career statistic as Bradman, a baseball batter would need a career batting average of .392, while a basketball player would need to score an average of 43.0 points per game over their career. The respective records are .366 and 30.1.

When Bradman died, Time allocated a space in its "Milestones" column for an obituary:

...Australian icon considered by many to be the pre-eminent sportsman of all time...One of Australia's most beloved heroes, he was revered abroad as well. When Nelson Mandela was released after 27 years in prison, his first question to an Australian visitor was, "Is Sir Donald Bradman still alive?"

== Playing style ==
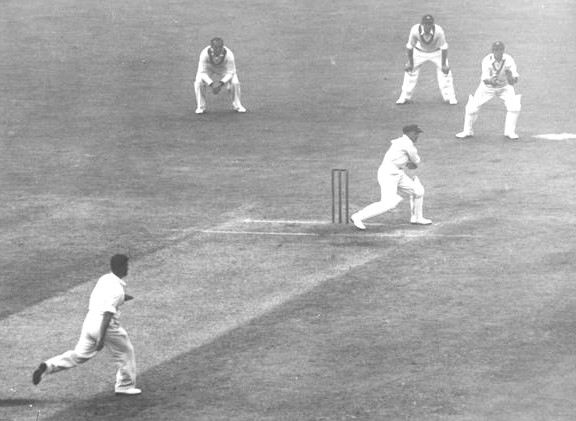
Bradman hooks English left-arm fast bowler Bill Voce during the 1936–37 series. The position of Bradman's left foot in relation to the stumps is an example of how he used the crease when batting.

Bradman's early development was shaped by the high bounce of the ball on matting-over-concrete pitches. He favoured "horizontal-bat" shots (such as the hook, pull and cut) to deal with the bounce and devised a unique grip on the bat handle that would accommodate these strokes without compromising his ability to defend. Employing a side-on stance at the wicket, Bradman kept perfectly still as the bowler ran in. His backswing had a "crooked" look that troubled his early critics, but he resisted entreaties to change. His backswing kept his hands in close to the body, leaving him perfectly balanced and able to change his stroke mid-swing, if need be. Another telling factor was the decisiveness of Bradman's footwork. He "used the crease" by either coming metres down the pitch to drive, or playing so far back that his feet ended up level with the stumps when playing the cut, hook or pull.

Bradman's game evolved with experience. He temporarily adapted his technique during the Bodyline series, deliberately moving around the crease in an attempt to score from the short-pitched deliveries. At his peak, in the mid-1930s, he had the ability to switch between a defensive and attacking approach as the occasion demanded. After the Second World War, he adjusted to bat within the limitations set by his age, becoming a steady "accumulator" of runs. However, Bradman never truly mastered batting on sticky wickets. Wisden commented, "[i]f there really is a blemish on his amazing record it is ... the absence of a significant innings on one of those 'sticky dogs' of old".

== After cricket ==
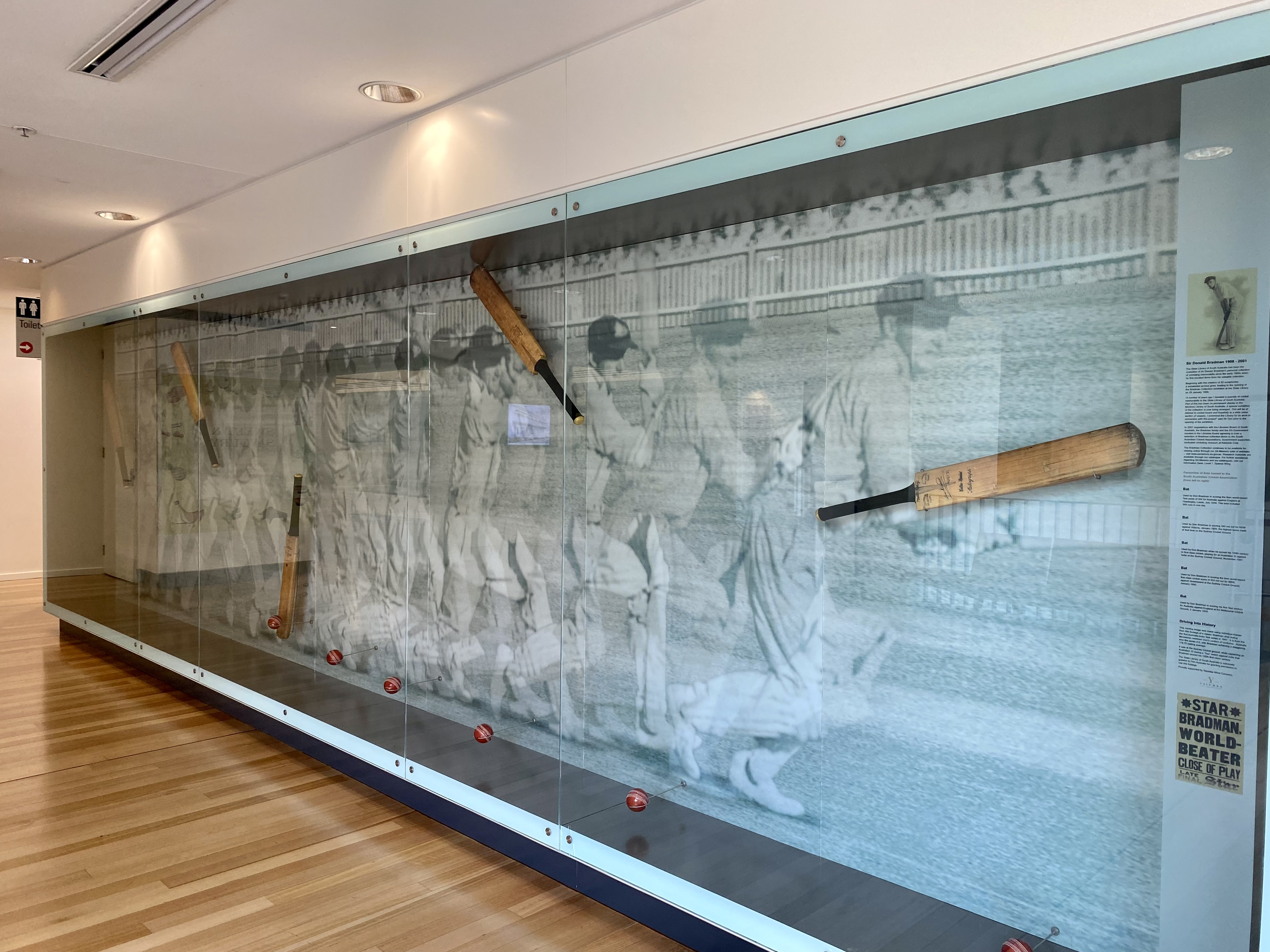
Bradman's bats used in his historic performances, at the State Library of South Australia

After his return to Australia, Bradman played in his own Testimonial match at Melbourne, scoring his 117th and last century, and receiving £9,342 in proceeds (~$A606,489 in 2021 terms). In the 1949 New Year Honours, he was appointed Knight Bachelor for his services to the game, becoming the only Australian cricketer ever to be knighted. He commented that he "would have preferred to remain just Mister". The following year he published a memoir, Farewell to Cricket. Bradman accepted offers from the Daily Mail to travel with, and write about, the 1953 and 1956 Australian teams in England. The Art of Cricket, his final book published in 1958, is an instructional manual.

Bradman retired from his stockbroking business in June 1954, depending on the "comfortable" income earned as a board member of 16 publicly listed companies. His highest profile affiliation was with Argo Investments Limited, where he was chairman for a number of years. Charles Williams commented that, "[b]usiness was excluded on medical grounds, [so] the only sensible alternative was a career in the administration of the game which he loved and to which he had given most of his active life".

Bradman was honoured at a number of cricket grounds, notably when his portrait was hung in the Long Room at Lord's; until Shane Warne's portrait was added in 2005, Bradman was one of just three Australians to be honoured in this way. Bradman inaugurated a "Bradman Stand" at the Sydney Cricket Ground in January 1974; the Adelaide Oval also opened a Bradman Stand in 1990, which housed new media and corporate facilities. The Oval's Bradman Stand was demolished in 2012 as the stadium underwent an extensive re-development. Later in 1974, he attended a Lord's Taverners function in London where he experienced heart problems, which forced him to limit his public appearances to select occasions only. With his wife, Bradman returned to Bowral in 1976, where the new cricket ground was named in his honour. He gave the keynote speech at the historic Centenary Test at Melbourne in 1977.

On 16 June 1979, the Australian government awarded Bradman the nation's second-highest civilian honour at that time, Companion of the Order of Australia (AC), "in recognition of service to the sport of cricket and cricket administration". In 1980, he resigned from the ACB, to lead a more secluded life.

=== Administrative career ===
In addition to acting as one of South Australia's delegates to the Board of Control from 1945 to 1980, Bradman was a committee member of the SACA between 1935 and 1986. It is estimated that he attended 1,713 SACA meetings during this half century of service. Aside from two years in the early 1950s, he filled a selector's berth for the Test team between 1936 and 1971.

Cricket saw an increase in defensive play during the 1950s. As a selector, Bradman favoured attacking, positive cricketers who entertained the paying public. He formed an alliance with Australian captain Richie Benaud, seeking more attractive play, with some success. He served two high-profile periods as chairman of the board of Control, in 1960–63 and 1969–72. During the first, he dealt with the growing prevalence of illegal bowling actions in the game, a problem that he adjudged "the most complex I have known in cricket, because it is not a matter of fact but of opinion". The major controversy of his second stint was a proposed tour of Australia by South Africa in 1971–72. On Bradman's recommendation, the series was cancelled. Cricket journalist Michael Coward said of Bradman as an administrator:

Bradman was more than a cricket player nonpareil. He was...an astute and progressive administrator; an expansive thinker, philosopher and writer on the game. Indeed, in some respects, he was as powerful, persuasive and influential a figure off the ground as he was on it.

In the late 1970s, Bradman played an important role during the World Series Cricket schism as a member of a special Australian Cricket Board committee formed to handle the crisis. He was criticised for not airing an opinion, but he dealt with World Series Cricket far more pragmatically than other administrators. Richie Benaud described Bradman as "a brilliant administrator and businessman", warning that he was not to be underestimated. As Australian captain, Ian Chappell fought with Bradman over the issue of player remuneration in the early 1970s and has suggested that Bradman was parsimonious:

I...thought to myself, 'Ian, did you just ask Bradman to fill your wallet with money?' Bradman's harangue confirmed my suspicions that the players were going to have a hard time extracting more money from the ACB.

=== Cancellation of South Africa tour ===
Despite South Africa's apartheid regime excluding black players from participating in national sports, many countries including Australia retained sporting relations with the regime until the mid-1970s. In this vein, the South African national cricket team was meant to tour Australia over the 1971–72 Australian summer. Public polls from the time suggested that, despite a group of very active protestors, around 75% of Australians wanted the tour to go ahead – believing that Australia should not interfere with South Africa's domestic politics.

Bradman, as Chair of the Australian Cricket Board, was initially sympathetic to this majority position of allowing the planned tour to proceed. He expressed the view that white South African cricketers, many of whom had voiced their opposition to Apartheid and "had tried harder than our [Australian] protestors to do something about it", should not be punished for the decisions of their national government. However, seeking to understand the situation better, Bradman travelled to South Africa in June 1971. While there, Bradman met with then South African Prime Minister John Vorster. Their exchange was documented as follows:

- Bradman: "Why don't you choose blacks in the team? I want to know."
- Vorster: "Blacks understand rugby but they don't understand the intricacies of cricket. [They] can't handle it."
- Bradman: "Have you heard of Garry Sobers?"

Sobers, a West Indian cricketer, was regarded as perhaps the greatest cricketing all-rounder of all time, and was reportedly admired by Bradman – who had helped get Sobers out to play in South Australia the previous decade.

When Bradman returned to Australia later in the year, and in the absence of any intervention by the Australian Government to prevent the tour, he argued to the other members of the Australian Cricket Board that they should cancel the tour. On behalf of the Board, Bradman made a one-line statement to the press: "We will not play them [South Africa] until they choose a team on a non-racial basis."

At the time, many disapproved of Bradman's decision to cancel to the tour. Vorster decried the decision, calling it one by "anarchists, communists and fellow travellers". Even Australian Prime Minister William McMahon expressed regret at the decision, saying the tour had been wanted by a "great many Australians". Meanwhile, some Australian newspapers lamented that "a small violent group of trouble-makers has won the day" and that "Bradman had conced[ed] defeat without a ball being bowled". The decision was, however, praised in other media, and was well received by anti-apartheid activists in South Africa. Those who appreciated Bradman's decision included a then-imprisoned Nelson Mandela. After Bradman's death, Mandela praised him on public television – stating that "he was a hero, a true hero".

Although Bradman became unwell and died before the two could meet, Australian Prime Minister Malcolm Fraser gifted Mandela a signed bat from the cricketer, which read: "To Nelson Mandela – in recognition of a great, unfinished innings".

=== Later years and death ===
After his wife's death in 1997, Bradman suffered "a discernible and not unexpected wilting of spirit". The next year, on his 90th birthday, he hosted a meeting with his two favourite modern players, Shane Warne and Sachin Tendulkar, but he was not seen in his familiar place at the Adelaide Oval again. In an oft-recited anecdote, Tendulkar was impressed with Bradman's sharpness and sense of humour at this historic meeting:

I (Tendulkar) asked him a question: 'What would you have averaged in today's cricket?' He thought about it and said 'Maybe 70'. The natural reaction was 'Why only 70 and not 99?' He said, 'C'mon, that's not bad for a 90-year-old man.'

Hospitalised with pneumonia in December 2000, he returned home in the New Year and died there on 25 February 2001, aged 92.

A memorial service to mark Bradman's life was held on 25 March 2001 at St Peter's Anglican Cathedral, Adelaide. The service was attended by a host of former and current Test cricketers, as well as Australia's then prime minister, John Howard, leader of the opposition Kim Beazley and former prime minister Bob Hawke. Eulogies were given by Richie Benaud and Governor-General Sir William Deane. The service was broadcast live on ABC Television to a viewing audience of 1.45 million. A private service for family and friends was earlier held at the Centennial Park Cemetery in the suburb of Pasadena, with many people lining both Greenhill and Goodwood Roads to pay their respects as his funeral motorcade passed by.

== Legacy ==
Cricket writer David Frith summed up the paradox of the continuing fascination with Bradman:

As the years passed, with no lessening of his reclusiveness, so his public stature continued to grow, until the sense of reverence and unquestioning worship left many of his contemporaries scratching their heads in wondering admiration.

Although modest about his own abilities and generous in his praise of other cricketers, Bradman was fully aware of the talents he possessed as a player; there is some evidence that he sought to influence his legacy. During the 1980s and 1990s, Bradman carefully selected the people to whom he gave interviews, assisting Michael Page, Roland Perry and Charles Williams, who all produced biographical works about him. Bradman also agreed to an extensive interview with Norman May for ABC Radio, broadcast as Bradman: The Don Declares in eight 55-minute episodes during 1988.

As early as 1939, Bradman had a Royal Navy ship named after him. Built as a fishing trawler in 1936, HMS Bradman was taken over by the Admiralty in 1939, but was sunk by German aircraft the following year.

In the 1963 edition of Wisden Cricketers' Almanack, Bradman was selected by Neville Cardus as one of the Six Giants of the Wisden Century. This was a special commemorative selection requested by Wisden for its 100th edition. The other five players chosen were: Sydney Barnes, W. G. Grace, Jack Hobbs, Tom Richardson and Victor Trumper.

On 10 December 1985, Bradman was the first of 120 inaugural inductees into the Sport Australia Hall of Fame. He spoke of his philosophy for considering the stature of athletes:

When considering the stature of an athlete or for that matter any person, I set great store in certain qualities which I believe to be essential in addition to skill. They are that the person conducts his or her life with dignity, with integrity, courage, and perhaps most of all, with modesty. These virtues are totally compatible with pride, ambition, and competitiveness.

The most significant legacy project was the Bradman Museum, opened in 1989 at the Bradman Oval in Bowral. This organisation was reformed in 1993 as a non-profit charitable Trust, called the Bradman Foundation.

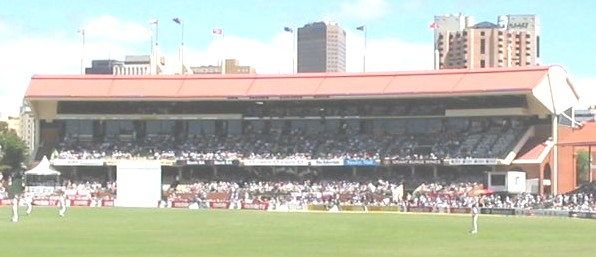
The former Bradman Stand at the Adelaide Oval

The Bradman Stand at Adelaide Oval was created in 1990 to house media and corporate functions. It was demolished in 2012 as the stadium underwent an extensive redevelopment, being replaced by the Riverbank Stand in 2013. The redevelopment included renaming the central part of the Western Stand the Sir Donald Bradman Pavilion.

When the Australian Cricket Hall of Fame was created in Melbourne in 1996, Bradman was made one of its 10 inaugural members. In 2000, Bradman was selected by cricket experts as one of five Wisden Cricketers of the Century. Each of the 100 members of the panel were able to select five cricketers: all 100 voted for Bradman. The ICC Cricket Hall of Fame inducted him on 19 November 2009.

Bradman's life and achievements were recognised in Australia with two notable issues. Three years before he died, he became the first living Australian to be featured on an Australian postage stamp. After his death, the Australian Government produced a 20-cent coin to commemorate his life.

The State Library of South Australia in Adelaide approached Bradman in the late 1960s about his transferring his personal collection of memorabilia to them. Bradman then collaborated in the creation of scrapbooks about his career which he donated to the library along with bats, balls, trophies and tape recordings detailing his career. The original scrapbooks are held by the National Library of Australia in Canberra. The Bradman Collection was formally opened in a dedicated display space at the State Library of South Australia by Prime Minister John Howard in 1998.

In 1999, Bradman was named in the six-man shortlist for BBC Sports Personality of the Century. Asteroid 2472 Bradman, discovered by Luboš Kohoutek, is named in his honour.

To mark 150 years of the Wisden Cricketers' Almanack, Wisden named him as captain of an all-time Test World XI in 2013. On 27 August 2018, to celebrate 110 years since his birth, Bradman was commemorated with a Google Doodle.

On 3 December 2024, a cap worn by Bradman sold for 250,000 US dollars at auction.

== Family life ==
Bradman first met Jessie Martha Menzies in 1920 when she boarded with the Bradman family, to be closer to school in Bowral. Bradman later said he fell in love with her on the first day he met her, and that year decided to marry her. The couple married at St Paul's Anglican Church at Burwood, Sydney on 30 April 1932.

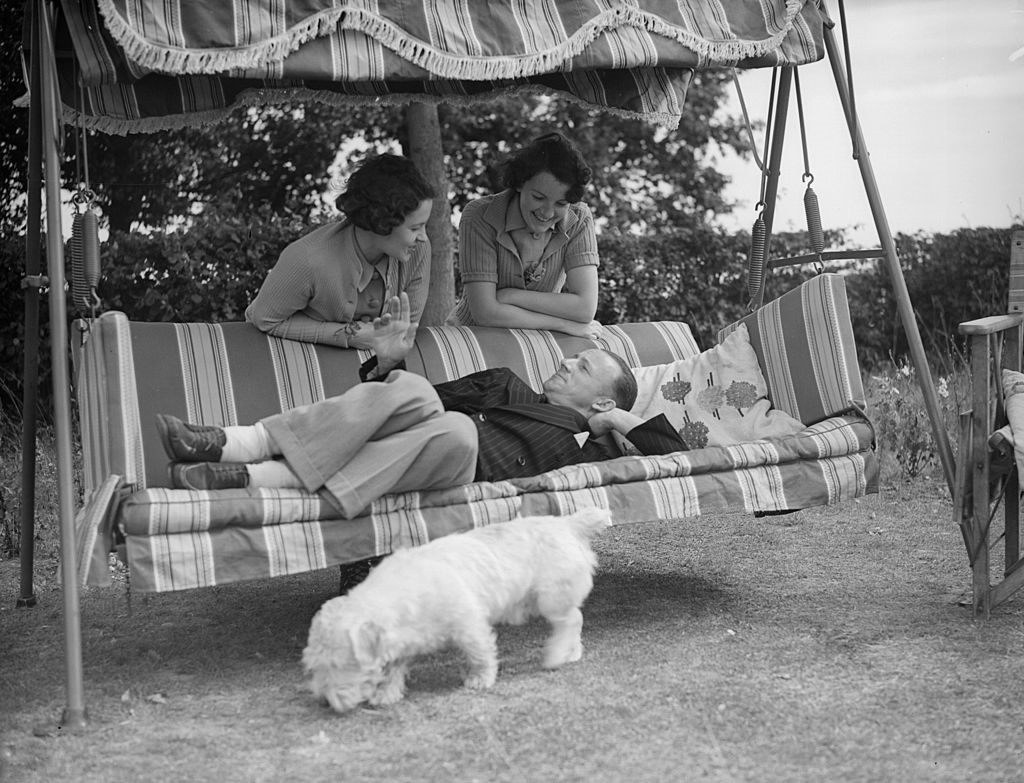
Bradman with wife (left) in 1938 near Maidenhead, England

The two were devoted to each other. During their 65-year marriage, Jessie was "shrewd, reliable, selfless, and above all, uncomplicated...she was the perfect foil to his concentrated, and occasionally mercurial character". Bradman paid tribute to his wife numerous times, once saying succinctly, "I would never have achieved what I achieved without Jessie".

The Bradmans lived in the same modest, suburban house at 2 Holden Street, Kensington Park, Adelaide, for all but the first three years of their married life. They experienced personal tragedy in raising their children: their first-born son died as an infant in 1936; their second son, John (born in 1939), contracted polio; and their daughter, Shirley, born in 1941, had cerebral palsy from birth. His family name proved a burden for John Bradman; he legally changed his last name to Bradsen in 1972. Although claims were made that he became estranged from his father, it was more a matter of "the pair inhabit[ing] different worlds", and the two remained in contact through the years. After the cricketer's death, a collection of personal letters written by Bradman to his close friend Rohan Rivett between 1953 and 1977 was released and gave researchers new insights into Bradman's family life, including the strain between father and son. However, John Bradman later rejected the view that his relationship with his father was strained.

Bradman's reclusiveness in later life is partly attributable to the ongoing health problems of his wife, particularly following the open-heart surgery Jessie underwent in her 60s. Lady Bradman died in 1997, aged 88, from cancer. This had a dispiriting effect on Bradman, but the relationship with his son improved, to the extent that John resolved to change his name back to Bradman. Since his father's death, John Bradman has become the spokesperson for the family and has been involved in defending the Bradman legacy in a number of disputes. The relationship between Bradman and his wider family is less clear, although nine months after Bradman's death, his nephew Paul Bradman criticised him as a "snob" and a "loner" who forgot his connections in Bowral and who failed to attend the funerals of Paul's mother and father.

In addition to Bradman's two children, he was survived by three grandchildren: Greta Bradman, Tom Bradman, and Nick Bradman. Greta Bradman is an operatic soprano, psychologist, and radio broadcaster. She has released several albums and performed at numerous national events in Australia, including the State Memorial Service of Shane Warne. Tom Bradman worked at the Australian Department of Agriculture before taking up farming, appearing on the Australian TV show Landline, where he discussed his approach to regenerative agriculture. In 2017, Nick Bradman appeared on the front cover of the Australian newspaper The Advertiser, after attaining a university entrance score of 99.95 (eclipsing his grandfather's batting average of 99.94). He subsequently received the University Medal in law from the Australian National University.

== In popular culture ==
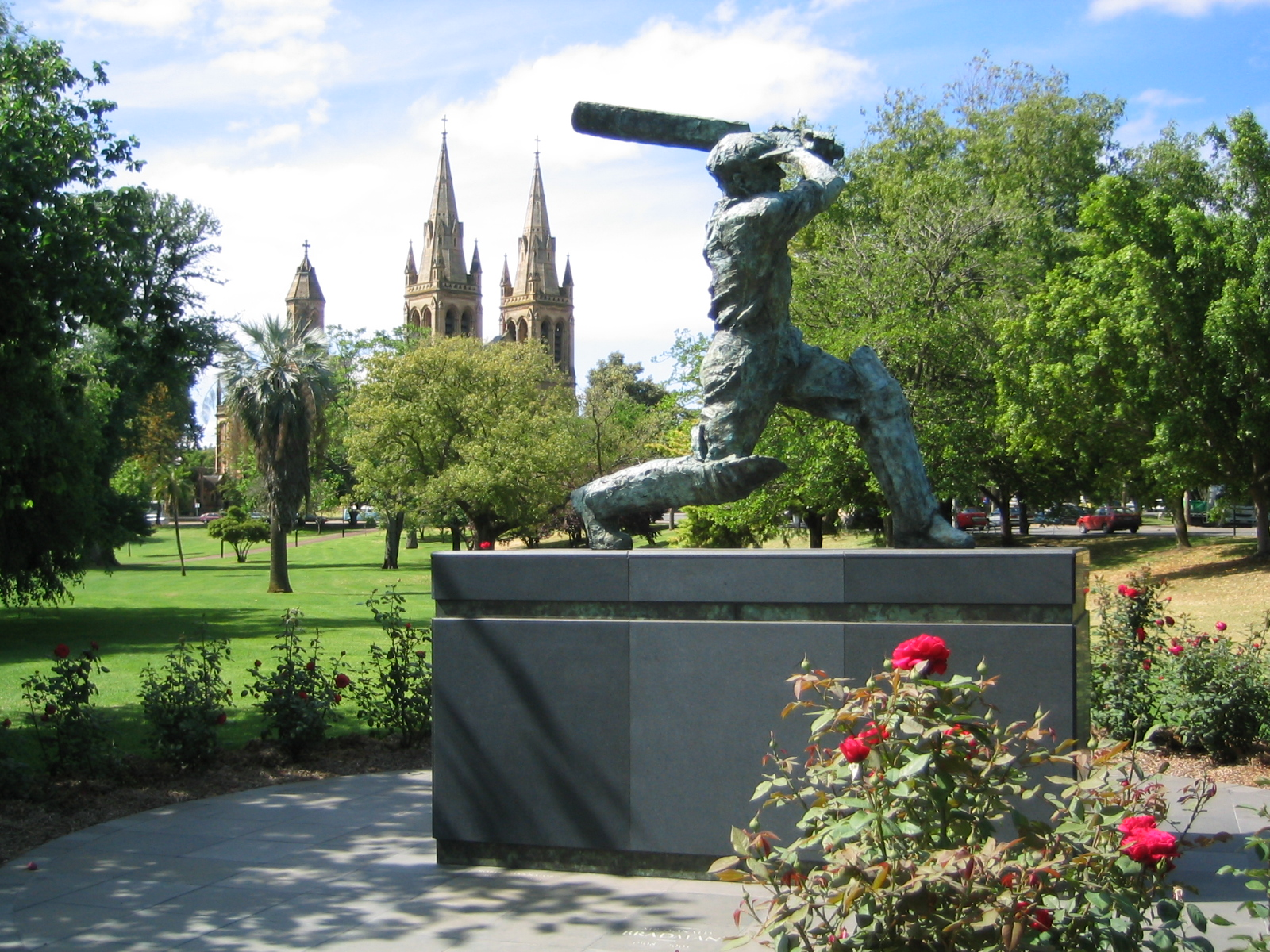
Bradman statue outside the Adelaide Oval

Bradman's name has become an archetypal name for outstanding excellence, both within cricket and in the wider world. The term Bradmanesque has been coined and is used both within and outside cricketing circles. Steve Waugh described Sri Lankan Muttiah Muralitharan as "the Don Bradman of bowling".

This universal recognition and fame as a high scoring batsman led to the Bradman Prize in golf being named in his honour.

Bradman has been the subject of the second-most biographies of any Australian, behind only the bushranger Ned Kelly. Bradman himself wrote four books: Don Bradman's Book: The Story of My Cricketing Life with Hints on Batting, Bowling and Fielding (1930), My Cricketing Life (1938), Farewell to Cricket (1950) and The Art of Cricket (1958). The story of the Bodyline series was retold in a 1984 television mini-series, with Gary Sweet portraying Bradman.

Bradman has been immortalised in various popular songs of very different styles and eras. Here are some of the more well-known songs about him:

- "Our Don Bradman", a jaunty ditty written by Jack O'Hagan and performed by Art Leonard, was recorded during 1930.
- "Bradman", written and performed by Paul Kelly, appeared on a single with "Leaps and Bounds" and the CD release of Kelly's 1987 album Under the Sun.
- "The Tiger and the Don", written and performed by Ted Egan, released on the 1989 album This Land Australia and the 2003 album The Land Downunder.
- "Sir Don", a 1996 tribute written by John Williamson, who performed it at Bradman's Memorial Service.
- He was featured in the infamous 2007 "Eulogy Song" written by Chris Taylor of The Chaser, in which his bad temper and overall crankiness was outlined.
- Greg Champion wrote and recorded the comedic song "I Was A Mate of Don Bradman" for his 2009 album Strayana.

Bradman recorded several songs accompanying himself and others on piano in the early 1930s, including "Every Day Is A Rainbow Day For Me" with Jack Lumsdaine. In 2000, the Australian Government made it illegal for the names of corporations to suggest a link to "Sir Donald Bradman" if such a link does not, in fact, exist. Other entities with similar protection include the Australian and foreign governments, Saint Mary MacKillop, the Royal Family, and the Returned and Services League of Australia.

He appeared as himself in the 1936 film The Flying Doctor. In the 1940s Ken G. Hall considered making a film about Bradman but eventually decided he was not sufficiently famous in America.

In 2014, the Adelaide Symphony Orchestra premiered a "multimedia musical portrait" called Our Don that had been nearly three years in the making. Greta Bradman performed during the event.

The postal address for the Australian Broadcasting Corporation is "GPO Box 9994" in each Australian capital city, which is based on Bradman's batting average in test matches of 99.94.

== Bibliography ==
- Bradman, Don (1935). How to Play Cricket. Associated Newspapers Ltd, London.

== See also ==
- List of Test cricket records
- ICC Player Rankings

== Sources ==
- Baldwin, Mark (2005): The Ashes' Strangest Moments: Extraordinary But True Tales from Over a Century of the Ashes, Franz Steiner Verlag. ISBN 1-86105-863-2.
- Bradman, Don (1950): Farewell to Cricket, 1988 Pavilion Library reprint. ISBN 1-85145-225-7.
- Cashman, Richard et al. – editors (1996): The Oxford Companion to Australian Cricket, Oxford University Press. ISBN 0-19-553575-8.
- Coleman, Robert (1993): Seasons in the Sun: the Story of the Victorian Cricket Association, Hargreen Publishing Company. ISBN 0-949905-59-3.
- Davis, Charles (2000): The Best Of the Best: A New Look at the Great Cricketers and Changing Times, ABC Books. ISBN 0-7333-0899-6.
- Dunstan, Keith (1988, rev. ed.): The Paddock That Grew, Hutchinson Australia. ISBN 0-09-169170-2.
- Eason, Alan (2004): The A-Z of Bradman, ABC Books. ISBN 0-7333-1517-8.
- Fingleton, Jack (1949): Brightly Fades the Don, 1985 Pavilion Library reprint. ISBN 0-907516-69-6.
- Frith, David (2002): Bodyline Autopsy, ABC Books. ISBN 0-7333-1321-3.
- Gibbs, Barry (2001): My Cricket Journey, Wakefield Press. ISBN 1-86254-569-3.
- Harte, Chris (1993): A History of Australian Cricket, André Deutsch. ISBN 0-233-98825-4.
- Haigh, Gideon. "Sir Donald Bradman at 100." The Monthly, August 2008.
- Haigh, Gideon (1993): The Cricket War – the Inside Story of Kerry Packer's World Series Cricket, Text Publishing Company. ISBN 1-86372-027-8.
- Hutchins, Brett (2002): Don Bradman: Challenging the Myth, Cambridge University Press. ISBN 0-521-82384-6.
- O'Reilly, Bill (1985): Tiger – 60 Years of Cricket, William Collins. ISBN 0-00-217477-4.
- McGilvray, Alan & Tasker, Norman (1985): The Game Is Not the Same, ABC Books. ISBN 978-0-642-52738-7.
- Page, Michael (1983): Bradman – The Illustrated Biography, Macmillan Australia. ISBN 0-333-35619-5.
- Perry, Roland (1995): The Don – A Biography of Sir Donald Bradman, Macmillan. ISBN 0-7329-0827-2.
- Robinson, Ray (1981 rev. ed.): On Top Down Under, Cassell Australia. ISBN 0-7269-7381-5.
- Rosenwater, Irving (1978): Sir Donald Bradman – A Biography, Batsford. ISBN 0-7134-0664-X.
- Wallace, Christine (2004): The Private Don, Allen & Unwin. ISBN 978-1-74175-158-1.
- Whitington, RS (1974): The Book of Australian Test Cricket 1877–1974, Wren Publishing. ISBN 0-85885-197-0.
- Williams, Charles (1996): Bradman: An Australian Hero, 2001 Abacus reprint. ISBN 0-349-11475-7.
- Wisden Cricketers' Almanack: various editions, accessed via ESPN Cricinfo

Sporting positions
Preceded by Vic Richardson; Bill Brown	Australian Test cricket captain 1936/7–1938; 1946/7–1948	Succeeded by Bill Brown; Lindsay Hassett
Preceded by Bill Dowling; Bob Parish	Chairman of the Australian Cricket Board; 1960–1963; 1969–1972	Succeeded by Ewart Macmillan; Tim Caldwell
Records
Preceded by Andy Sandham	World record – Highest individual score in Test cricket 334 vs England at Leeds, 1930	Succeeded by Wally Hammond
Preceded by Bill Ponsford	Highest individual score in first-class cricket 452 not out New South Wales v Queensland at Sydney 1929–30	Succeeded by Hanif Mohammad
