= Luke Dollman =

Australian conductor

- Origin: Australia
- Genres: Classical
- Occupation(s): Conductor, violinist
- Instrument: Violin
- Website: lukedollman.webmate.me

Luke Dollman is an Australian conductor. Dollman is a violinist who moved into conducting. Together with Greta Bradman, the Adelaide Symphony Orchestra and the Adelaide Chamber Singers, Dollman was nominated for the 2018 ARIA Award for Best Classical Album for the album Home.

== Discography ==
=== Albums ===
List of albums, with Australian chart positions
Title	Album details	Peak chart positions
Title	Album details	AUS
Home (with Greta Bradman, Adelaide Symphony Orchestra & Adelaide Chamber Singers)	Released: April 2018; Format: CD, Digital; Label: Greta Bradman, Decca (481 6564)	30

== Awards and nominations ==
=== ARIA Music Awards ===
The ARIA Music Awards are presented annually from 1987 by the Australian Recording Industry Association (ARIA).

Year	Nominee / work	Award	Result	Ref.
2018	Home (with Greta Bradman, Adelaide Symphony Orchestra & Adelaide Chamber Singers)	Best Classical Album	Nominated	
