= The Art of Cricket =

Book by Donald Bradman

- First edition
- Author: Sir Donald Bradman
- Subject: Cricket
- Publisher: Hodder & Stoughton, London
- Publication date: 1958
- Media type: Hard cover
- Pages: 236
- OCLC: 60152165

The Art of Cricket is an instructional book on the game of cricket written by Sir Don Bradman in 1958. It is illustrated with black-and-white photographs and diagrams.

== Other books of the same title ==
- Warwick Armstrong wrote a cricket primer of the same title, first published by Methuen, London in 1922.
