= Bradman Oval =

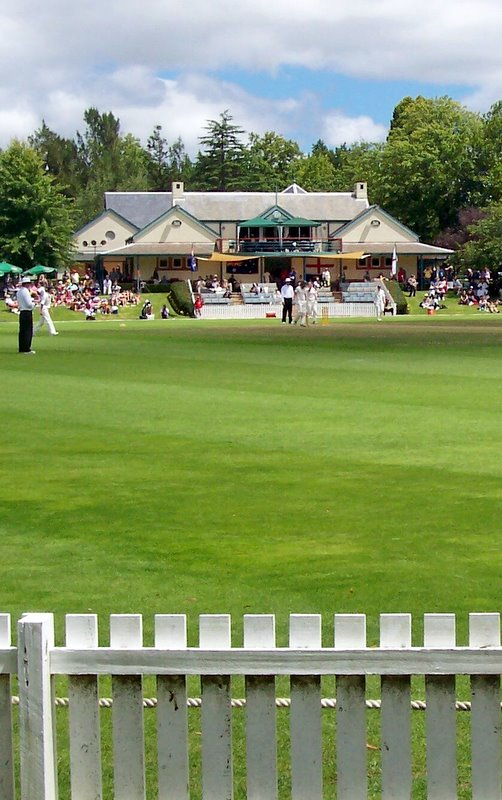

- Location within New South Wales Location within Australia
- 34.4827°S 150.4249°E
- Location: Glebe Street, Bowral, Wingecarribee Shire, New South Wales, Australia

History
- Built: 1893

Site notes
- Elevation: 690 m (2,260 ft)
- Owner: Wingecarribee Shire Council

New South Wales Heritage Register
- Official name: Bradman Oval and Collection of Cricket Memorabilia; Glebe Park
- Type: state heritage (complex / group)
- Designated: 23 June 2000
- Reference no.: 1399
- Type: Cricket Pitch/ Ground
- Category: Recreation and Entertainment

Ground information

International information
- Only women's Test: 15 February 2008: Australia v England
- First women's ODI: 1 February 2000: Australia v England
- Last women's ODI: 18 November 2014: Australia v West Indies
- As of 7 September 2020; Source: CricketArchive

Bradman Oval is a heritage-listed cricket ground in Glebe Street, Bowral in the southern highlands area of New South Wales, Australia. It was named after cricketer Don Bradman, who lived locally and played at the ground in the 1920s. His ashes are scattered on and near the Oval. It is also known as Glebe Park. It was added to the New South Wales State Heritage Register on 23 June 2000.

It is an attractive ground, with a white picket fence and an old fashioned pavilion. The Camden Woollybutt is the main gum tree species surrounding the playing surface. It has a seating capacity of up to 5,000 people (using temporary stands).

Bradman Oval and the nearby International Cricket Hall of Fame (which incorporates the Bradman Museum that operated 1989–2010) are tourist attractions for cricket fans in Australia, and for people visiting from overseas.

== History ==
The first reported cricket match played in Australia was in Sydney on 8 January 1804 at the park now known as Hyde Park. By the 1830s inter-club competition had commenced in Sydney and due to the discovery of gold in the 1850s, cricket spread rapidly to the other colonies of Australia.

The land on which Bradman Oval is situated was originally part of Glebe Park, granted to the Church of England by John Oxley.

In 1883 the Bowral Cricket Club was formed and cricket has been played on the ground since 1893.

George and Emily Bradman moved from a farm near Cootamundra to the adjacent (1890) house at 52 Shepherd Street, Bowral, in 1911. Young Don Bradman, future cricketer, lived here during his formative years, from age three to fifteen. The Bradmans had five children: Victor, Lilian, Islet, Elizabeth May and Donald, their youngest. Don was taught piano in this house, started school at Bowral Public School in 1913, and was later described by his headmaster as especially good at mathematics and French. He later became a gifted pianist, businessman and man of letters. At 12, Bradman scored his first century while living here. Every afternoon after school, Don would arrive home, run through the door, throw his satchel down in the hall and head out to the tank stand to play with his golf ball and stump. It was here as a 12-year-old he met Jessie Menzies, who would later become his wife of 65 years. Against the tank stand Don honed his reflexes with a golf ball, skills that saw him become the greatest batsman in Australia, with an average of 99.94.

Bradman first played on this oval when he was 12 and scored 29 not out for the Bowral Cricket Club.

Bradman became a member of the Bowral Cricket Club in 1925. During his first season in the Berrima District competition, Bradman scored 1,318 runs, an average of 94.14 runs. He also took 51 wickets, averaging 7.8 and held 26 catches.

Another memorable game on this ground was in 1925 when Bradman scored 234 against the Wingello team that included Bill O'Reilly.

In 1947 the "A Glebe" wicket was formally named the Bradman Oval. Later, improvements were made to the oval through the efforts of Bowral Municipal Council and Gordon Whatman of Bowral, personally maintained the wicket area.

In 1976 the reopening of a rehabilitated Bradman Oval was performed by Sir Donald Bradman himself in the company of the great Australian bowler Bill O'Reilly.

Overlooking the oval is the Pavilion which opened in 1989. It houses the Player's Club Room, change rooms and meeting room. Adjacent to the Pavilion is the Museum, often referred to as the Second Innings, which opened on 27 August 1996 (Sir Donald's 88th Birthday).

== Description ==
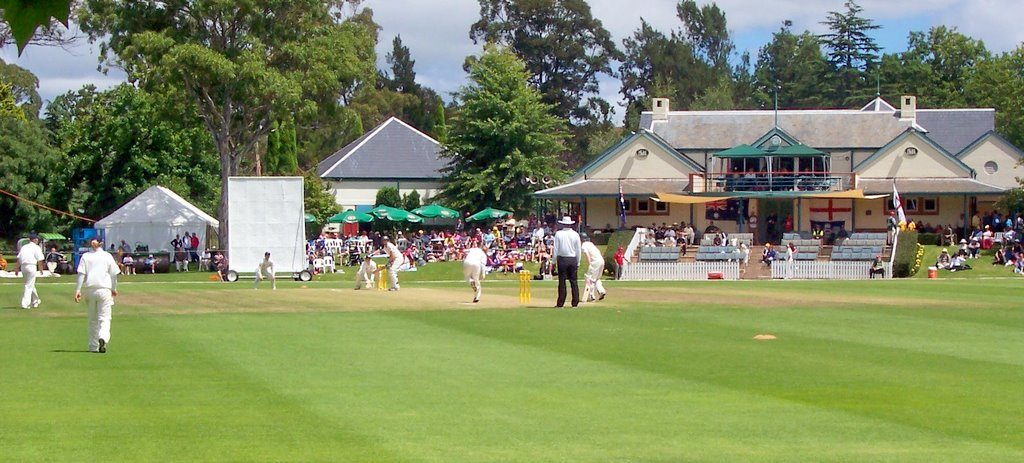
Ellyse Perry batting, Paul Reiffel umpiring at a women's Test match at Bowral, February 2008.

Bradman Oval is bounded by Glebe Street, Boolwey Street, St Jude Street and Bowral Street. A large parkland area dominated by a stand of mature eucalypts possibly remnants of the original vegetation. A stand of these on the eastern corner impart a sense of enclosure and offer a gateway to the corner site. A line of maturing quercus occupy the St Jude's Rd boundary, and a line of exotic trees are being established between the eucalypts and Bradman Oval. The park contains a children's playground with old road roller and adventure playground on the eastern side and is the location of the International Cricket Hall of Fame.

== Heritage listing ==
Bradman Oval is historically significant at a State level through its association with Sir Donald Bradman's cricketing activities, an association which has been reinforced by the recent construction of the Bradman Museum and the name change to Bradman Oval to commemorate national cricketing history. Bradman Oval provides a tangible link to Sir Donald Bradman's formative years. As the former Glebe Park, the Bradman Oval represents the country town parks of the turn of the century which were characterised by a simple planting layout of trees and a few shrubs and reflects a phase in the development of Bowral when attention was turning to the garden environment. Aesthetically, the park's simple layout is further enhanced by the combination of mature Eucalyptus and deciduous trees which enhance the surroundings.

Bradman Oval was listed on the New South Wales State Heritage Register on 23 June 2000.
