= Greta Bradman =

Australian operatic soprano

Greta Bradman AM
- Born: Greta Jessie Bradsen; 1979 (age 46–47) or 1981 or 1982 (age 44–45); Adelaide, South Australia, Australia
- Occupation: Operatic soprano
- Spouse: Didier Elzinga
- Children: 2
- Father: John Bradman
- Relatives: Sir Don Bradman (grandfather)

Greta Jessie Bradman AM (née Bradsen; born 1979 or 1982) is an Australian operatic soprano.

== Career ==
Richard Bonynge selected Bradman to sing the title role in a concert performance of Handel's Rodelinda in 2014.

Bradman was the subject of two episodes of the ABC TV program Australian Story in 2015. Later that year, she joined David Hobson, Teddy Tahu Rhodes, and Lisa McCune for a concert tour of the five Australian mainland state capitals. Bradman's name was added as a critics' choice to the Walk of Fame at the Adelaide Festival Centre.

After guest presenting in 2016, in 2017 Bradman joined ABC Classic FM as a presenter.

2017 saw Bradman's only performance in a fully staged opera as Mimì in Gale Edwards' production of La bohème for Opera Australia in the Sydney Opera House. Bradman – with vocalist Luke Harrison, guitarist Karin Schaupp and the Queensland Ballet – performed "Eliza Aria" from Elena Kats-Chernin's Wild Swans in the 2018 Commonwealth Games closing ceremony.

Bradman sang "Advance Australia Fair" at the state memorial service of Shane Warne in March 2022 at the MCG.

Opera Australia appointed Bradman to its board of directors in August 2024.

Bradman was appointed Member of the Order of Australia (AM) in the 2025 King's Birthday Honours.

== Personal life ==
Bradman was born in Adelaide as Greta Bradsen. She is a granddaughter, and the eldest grandchild, of cricketer Sir Donald Bradman, at whose funeral she sang in 2001 and who inspired her singing. Her father John had changed his name from Bradman to Bradsen to escape the inevitable connection with his father's celebrity, but the family changed back to Bradman when Greta was a teenager. Shortly after her grandfather's death, she struggled with self-harm issues.

Her husband is Didier Elzinga, the co-founder and CEO of software company Culture Amp. They have two sons.

Bradman has a master's degree in psychology and is a registered psychologist.

In 2015, Bradman was featured in two episodes of the Australian TV series Australian Story, where she appeared along with her father John Bradman and siblings Tom and Nick Bradman.

== Discography ==
=== Albums ===
List of albums, with Australian chart positions
Title	Album details	Peak chart positions
Title	Album details	AUS
Forest of Dreams – Classical Lullabies to Get Lost In	Released: August 2010; Format: CD, Digital; Label: Sony Music Australia	–
Grace	Released: August 2011; Format: CD, Digital; Label: Sony Music Australia	–
My Hero (with English Chamber Orchestra & Richard Bonynge)	Released: 7 August 2015; Format: CD, Digital; Label: Greta Bradman, Decca (481 1894)	–
From Broadway to La Scala (with David Hobson, Lisa McCune, Teddy Tahu Rhodes)	Released: 2017; Format: CD, Digital; Label: Greta Bradman, Decca (481 1894)	–
Home (with Adelaide Symphony Orchestra, Adelaide Chamber Singers & Luke Dollman)	Released: April 2018; Format: CD, Digital; Label: Greta Bradman, Decca (481 6564)	30
The Aussie Album (with Benaud Trio)	Released: 2018; Format: CD, Digital; Label: Greta Bradman, Decca (481 7164)	–
Mendelssohn: String Quartets No. 1 & 2 (with Tinalley Quartet)	Released: February 2019; Format: CD, Digital; Label: Tinalley Quartet	–

== Awards and nominations ==
=== ARIA Music Awards ===
The ARIA Music Awards are presented annually from 1987 by the Australian Recording Industry Association (ARIA).

Year	Nominee / work	Award	Result	Ref.
2010	Forest of Dreams: Classical Lullabies to Get Lost In	Best Children's Album	Nominated	
2018	Home (with Adelaide Symphony Orchestra, Adelaide Chamber Singers & Luke Dollman)	Best Classical Album	Nominated	
