= Bradman Museum & International Cricket Hall of Fame =

Museum in Australia

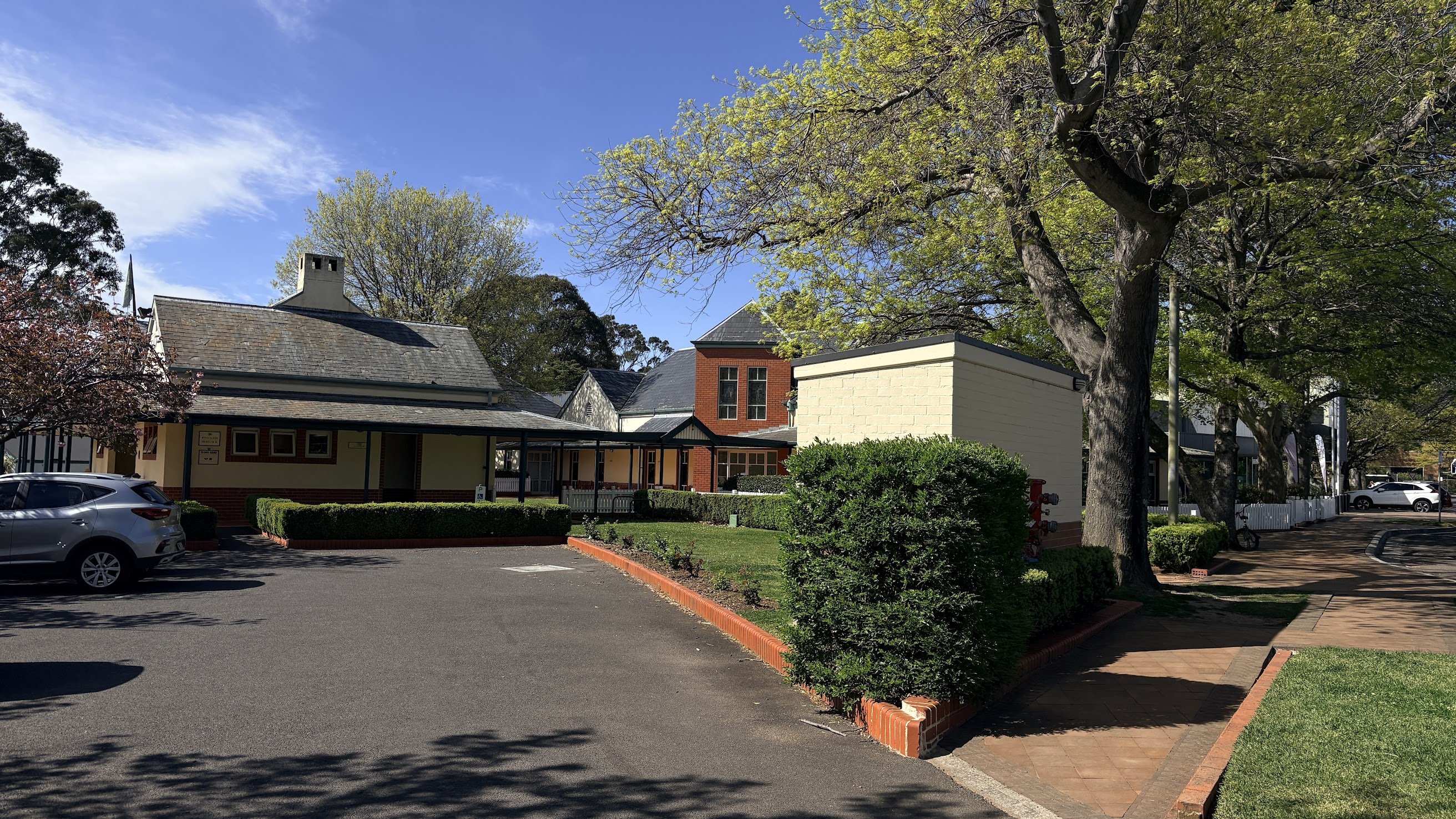
- Front side of Bradman Museum
- Established: 1989 (Bradman Museum); 2010 (International Cricket Hall of Fame)
- Location: Bowral, New South Wales, Australia
- Coordinates: 34.48294°S 150.42438°E
- Type: Museum and cricket hall of fame
- Website: bradman.com.au

The Bradman Museum & International Cricket Hall of Fame is a permanent cultural exhibition dedicated to the game of cricket and Australian cricketing hero Sir Donald Bradman. The Museum located in the Australian town of Bowral, New South Wales. The exhibition opened in November 2010 in buildings formerly used by the Bradman Museum, which was devoted to the cricketing career of the Australian batsman Sir Donald Bradman. The Bradman Museum opened in 1989. The Hall of Fame incorporated all of the former Bradman Museum's holdings. The Bradman Museum was, and in effect remains, the only museum in Australia dedicated principally to an individual.

The International Cricket Hall of Fame is adjacent to Bradman Oval, which was named after Sir Donald Bradman in 1947. The Oval was where he played many games in his early years, and where his and his wife's ashes are now scattered. The oval and museum are significant tourist attractions for Australians with an interest in the legend of Sir Donald Bradman, cricket fans in Australia, and for many people visiting from overseas. In 2016, after the ODI win over India in Manuka Oval, Canberra, on their way to Sydney Cricket Ground, the squad became the first Australian squad to ever visit the Museum.
