= Collingwood, Queensland =

Former town in Queensland, Australia

Collingwood
- Town
- Coordinates: 22°19′58″S 142°32′06″E
- Country: Australia
- State: Queensland
- LGA: Shire of Winton
- Location: 56.1 km (34.9 mi) W of Winton; 235 km (146 mi) NW of Longreach; 921 km (572 mi) WNW of Rockhampton; 1,412 km (877 mi) NW of Brisbane
- Established: ~1878
- Abolished: ~1900
- Elevation: 252 m (827 ft)

Population
  - Total: 0
- Time zone: UTC+10:00 (AEST)

Collingwood was a former town in the Channel Country in Central West Queensland, Australia, in the Shire of Winton. Collingwood was founded in the 1870s, and it was hoped that the town would thrive and grow into a regional centre that would foster the development of pastoral activity in the Diamantina region, an industry of great local importance to this day. However, Collingwood ultimately failed as a town and was given up after only about two decades of existence.

== Geography ==
=== Location ===
Collingwood was roughly 11 km up the Western River from the forks where it empties into the Diamantina River, one of only three major confluences on the Diamantina, roughly 52 km west of Winton. Both rivers are braided at this point, a landform that gives the Channel Country its name. Wokingham Creek, too, meets the Diamantina here, and feeds the Conn Waterhole (22.299°S 142.479°E), a hook-shaped body of water just up from the Diamantina whose size fluctuates with the region's climatic fortunes; drought is a common phenomenon here. A smaller stream, called Haine Creek (or Maine Creek – sources differ), empties into the Western from the south at the Collingwood site. Other streams nearby are Scarlet Creek, which empties into the Western from the south about 8 km upstream from the townsite, and Gum Creek, which empties into Mulray Creek, which empties into the Diamantina itself some 21 km southwest of the townsite, and roughly 14 km downstream from where the Western empties into the Diamantina. Lydia Creek empties into the Western from the south about two fifths of the way up to Winton. The land in the area is mostly flat grassland (specifically, Mitchell grass downs), although locally, there are a few points where the land rises above the surrounding flatness, among them Mount Booka Booka 10.5 km to the northwest, Mount Munro 12.4 km to the north, Mount Boorooma 15 km to the south, Mount Capo Goleburra 19 km to the south-southeast and Mount Hardwick right at the Conn Waterhole, 6.5 km northwest of the former town. The townsite, which is still identified on many maps as Collingwood, lies on the Diamantina River Road some four kilometres along from its junction with the Kennedy Developmental Road lying to the north, and there is a short road to the south of the former leading to what once was the Collingwood Cemetery. Upwards of 70 sheep and cattle stations lie within 70 km of the Collingwood site, some of which even date from the time when the town existed (see Collingwood today below), and figured in the town's short history.

Satellite Views of Collingwood's Location

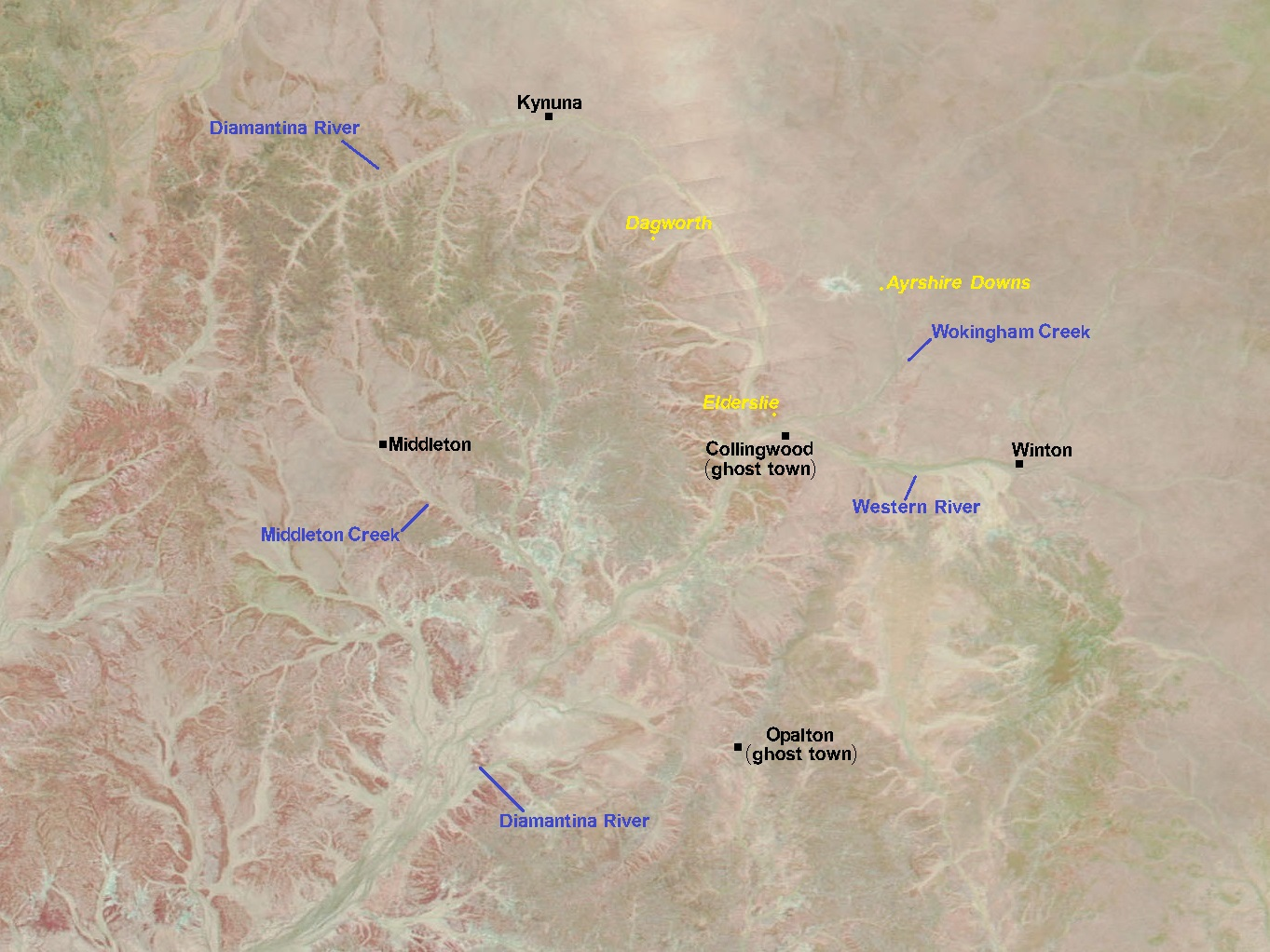
A dry-looking Collingwood area in December 2008 demonstrates, when seen next to the following image, seasonal changes in surface water.

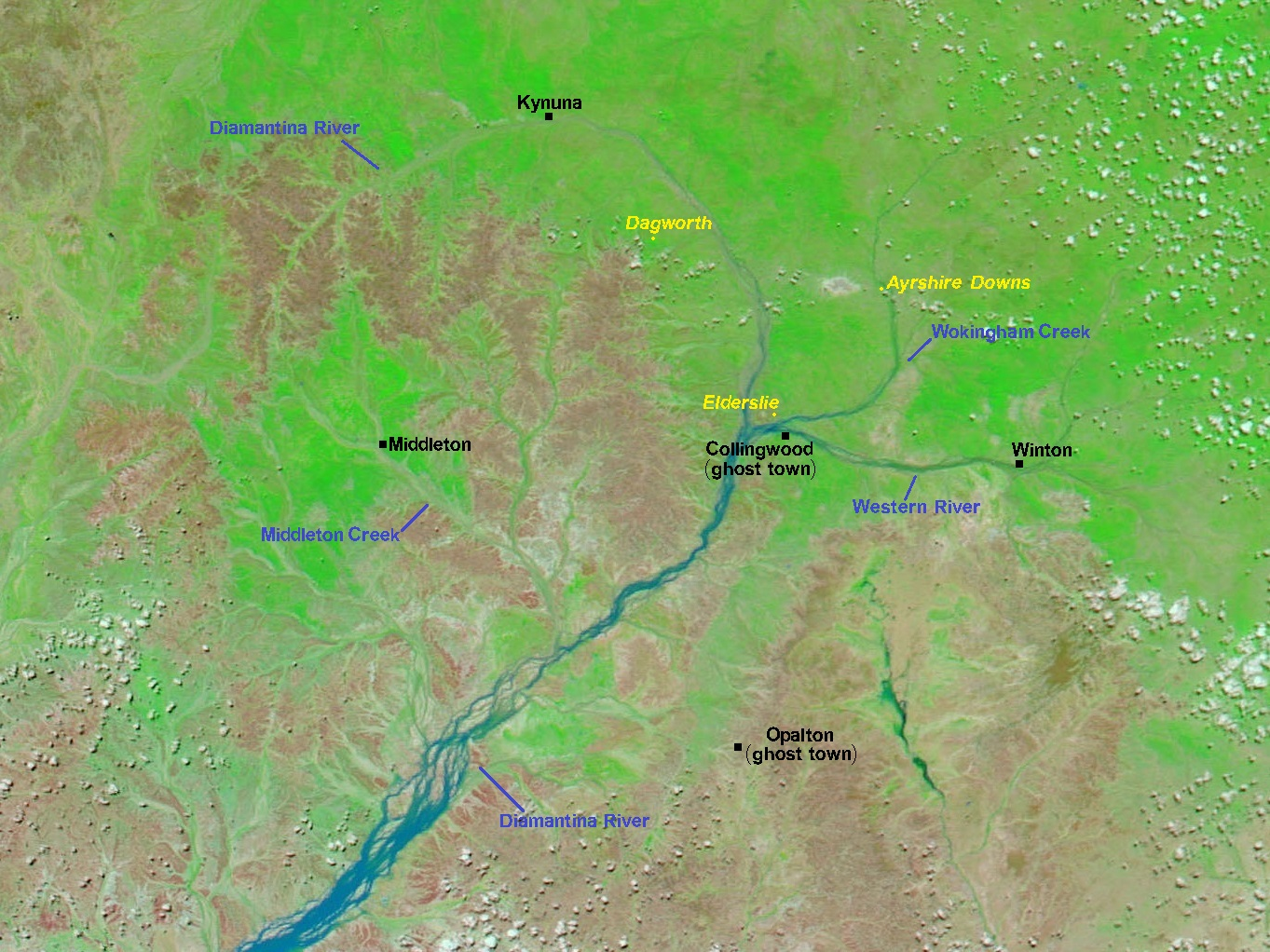
Only two months later, in February 2009, the Collingwood area seems a bit wetter and, consequently, lusher. This flooding happened towards the end of a drought.

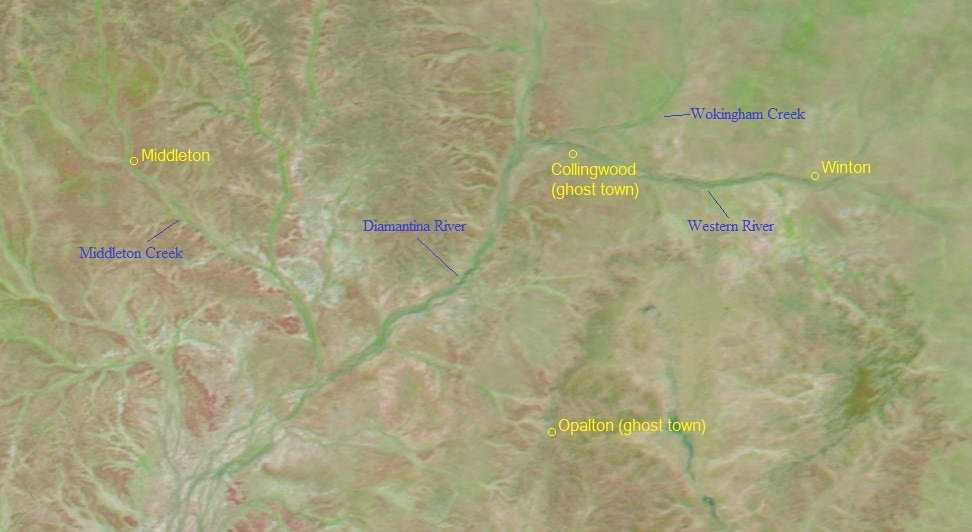
Flooding in January 2010 greened the land, especially near the rivers. This colouring, however, is exaggerated somewhat by NASA's use of both visible and infrared light in all three images.

=== Geology and palaeontology ===
Collingwood also lay in the Great Artesian Basin. Nevertheless, there does not seem to be any record of an artesian bore ever being attempted at Collingwood, as was done in many other places in Outback Queensland, even locally (as at Dagworth, 65 km to the northwest, in the 1890s) often with great success. Geologically, the site lies in the Eromanga Basin. More locally, the geology consists of the Cretaceous Winton Formation, and it was at Manfred Station (23.07°S 143.96°E), 168 km from Collingwood's former site, where the formation yielded up at least two palaeobotanical fossils to a J. Williams in 1920. More recently, in 2005, Australovenator and Diamantinasaurus matildae Early Cretaceous dinosaur remains were unearthed by palaeontologists at the "Matilda site" not far north of the former town, on Elderslie Station (22.29°S 142.47°E). A "major fault" passes just southeast of the Collingwood site, called the Cork Fault. It runs roughly northeast to southwest. Its downthrow is to the northwest, towards Collingwood. Seismic studies along this fault began in 1960 with the Bureau of Mineral Resources (now Geoscience Australia). In the years that followed, a number of other surveys were conducted by private companies, among which was the Western River Seismic Survey in 1967 by the United Geophysical Corporation, which was "aimed at further defining the Permo–Triassic section on the downthrown (west) side of the Cork Fault indicated by the previous Collingwood survey (Phillips, 1966)." This information is all held in a report that also mentions petroleum exploration in the area, with one exploratory well sunk about 20 km north of the former townsite, at Lovelle Downs (22.15°S 142.53°E). Drilling was underway late in 1972 by Hematite Petroleum. The Cork Fault might have begun as long ago as the Mesoproterozoic (1.6 to 1.0 billion years ago), when it would have been part of a great network of active normal faults in the land that would eventually come to be known as Australia, although then, the land was part of the supercontinent of Rodinia. The team from Monash University who reached these conclusions and presented them in 2015, namely Giovanni P. T. Spampinato, Laurent Aillères, Peter G. Betts and Robin J. Armit, believed that while the Cork Fault was to be regarded as a fundamental crustal discontinuity, it was not Rodinia's former eastern margin. This they believe because the Cork Fault is the line in the Earth's crust where the Proterozoic Mount Isa terrane (the fault's downthrown side mentioned above) has been thrust under the Phanaerozoic Thomson Orogen (the upthrown side).

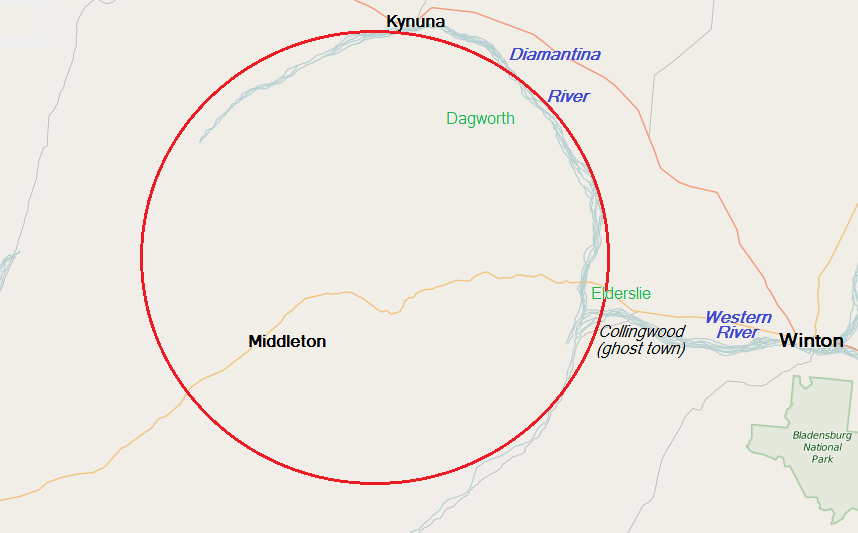
A map showing the rough extent of the crustal anomaly that may be an ancient impact structure.

Robert Logan Jack, FGS, FRGS, the Government Geologist for Queensland, wrote a report on the region (and indeed all Queensland) in 1892. Along with fellow geologist Robert Etheridge, Junior, the New South Wales Government Palaeontologist, Jack identified "a bed of gypsum, of workable thickness, and of great purity" at Chollarton, a place said by Jack to lie near Collingwood (although the name only seems to appear in one other place in the records, also in connection with Jack's work). Jack also mentioned in his report that the area between Wokingham Creek and the Diamantina River, just north of the town, was characterised by grey sandstones "with occasional sandy ironstone or ironmasked sandstone". He furthermore wrote that there was silicified wood strewn over the ground. Jack's report also makes clear that there are coal seams in the region. A well sunk about 1878 between Werna and Ayrshire Downs, about 50 km north of Collingwood, struck two such seams, and otherwise yielded strata of grey sandstones and sandy shales with beds of argillaceous flagstone (which contained seashells) and sandstone with iron pyrites. The well also yielded forth many fragments of silicified and carbonised wood. The boring ended at 204 feet (62 m) in hard, fine-grained sandstone. Water was struck at two levels below the first coal seam. Other wells in the region, too, struck coal (but not always water).

=== Possible asteroid strike ===
The Diamantina River's hook-shaped upper reaches have drawn scientific attention. In March 2015, Geoscience Australia reported that the river's course at and near its headwaters flows along the edge of a roughly circular crustal anomaly that might well be an impact structure. It is 130 km in diameter, and the Collingwood site lies right at its eastern edge. The asteroid impact, if indeed this is the explanation for the anomaly, would have happened roughly 300 million years ago.

=== Bioregion ===
In terms of bioregions, the Collingwood site lies within the Galilee subregion, itself part of the Lake Eyre Basin bioregion.

== History ==
=== Indigenous peoples ===
In the time before European colonisation, the Diamantina River, passing right by the townsite, served as a north-south trade highway for Indigenous Australians. The Maiawali and Karuwali traded such goods as boomerangs, shields and pituri for yellow ochre, stone for making tools, and various other things.

The semi-arid climate that characterises the Collingwood site and the surrounding area can be inhospitable. At least one early attempt by Europeans to colonise the area was thwarted by drought, leading settlers to choose to leave. Indigenous people, though, have lived in the Channel Country for thousands of years. According to the Queensland Historical Atlas, it was "Permanent waterholes and periodic pulses of substantial water" in the form of, sometimes heavy, rain that "allowed Aboriginal people to live in great numbers in the Channel Country". Actual Indigenous population figures from the time before European colonisation are unavailable, but John McKinlay, who passed near Collingwood's future site in 1862 while leading the South Australian Burke Relief Expedition (see European exploration in the area below) remarked that Indigenous people "seemed to pour out from every nook and corner where there was water". One of these places would have been the Conn Waterhole, which does not dry up in times of drought, and it lies right near the Collingwood site, and also right near McKinlay's route.

In a native title claim application initiated in 2015 by the Koa people (also called Goamalku, Goamulgo, Goa, Coah, Coa, Guwa or Kuwa, depending on the text), the Koa, claiming descent from a group of 16 persons who lived in the late 19th and early 20th centuries, were seeking to have traditional rights recognised in an area comprising 30 000 km^{2} of "the headwaters of the Diamantina River in what is now Northwest Queensland". Part of the basis of their claim is that Indigenous people's occupation of that land, their resource use and their trade were documented by Robert Christison in 1863 and R. M. Watson in 1873 in an area that included Winton, Elderslie Station and the Conn Waterhole at the junction of Wokingham Creek and the Diamantina River (Collingwood's former site). Linguistic and ethnographic evidence was also submitted in connection with this application, consisting of writings made by early White settlers. One of these accounts stated as follows:

...and extracted a range of food and other resources from their country essential to their sustenance and to the conduct of daily and traditional life. For example, Christison recorded that the ‘Goamulku' traded pituri for quartz flakes with the neighbouring ‘Dallabarra' group... [and] ...their ancestors used to trade gidgee wood spears and boomerangs with other tribes in the area.

The area that the Koa claim as their ancestral homeland is shown on a map accompanying their application. Despite having been a ghost town for well over a century, Collingwood is marked on this map, inside the homeland.

=== European exploration in the area ===
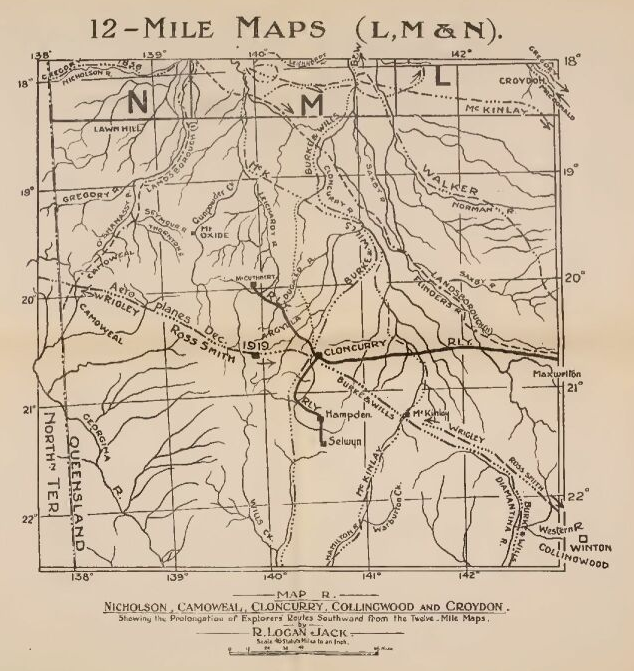
Map of Western Queensland published in 1921 showing Collingwood at the lower right – and Winton in the margin. Collingwood was already a ghost town by this time. The work is by Robert Logan Jack (see Geology and palaeontology above).

At least one account of the ill-fated Burke and Wills expedition tells that the two explorers and their party, on their northward journey, passed by the townsite in 1860 as they followed the Diamantina River. "This route would take them close to the future sites of Birdsville, Monkira [24.82°S 140.55°E], Davenport Downs, Diamantina Lakes, Brighton Downs [23.36°S 141.56°E], Cork [22.926°S 141.874°E], Collingwood, Kynuna, McKinlay and Cloncurry." Other accounts, though, have the expedition leaving the river once it swung eastwards – presumably meaning at the bend near Birdsville – and heading northwards, eventually along Eyre Creek. This makes it highly doubtful that Burke and Wills ever came within sight of Collingwood.

In less doubt is that John McKinlay's South Australian Burke Relief Expedition, a quest to find any sign of the vanished Burke and Wills expedition, came within a stone's throw of Collingwood's future site, if the explorers did not actually set foot there. McKinlay's Camp 32, where the expedition stayed overnight on 9 April 1862, was, as shown on a Royal Geographical Society map from 1863, right near the Conn Waterhole. Indeed, it may have been that very waterhole that McKinlay meant when he wrote in his journal about "Kell's Creek", where there was "plenty of water".

William Landsborough undertook extensive exploration of both the Western and Diamantina rivers in the 1860s, and it seems likely that he might have found himself at their confluence, especially as Landsborough himself mentioned in his diary made during an expedition undertaken in 1866 the "Giant's Table and Seat", a formation only about 35 km northwest from the Diamantina's forks with the Western. This he committed to paper on 19 March that year.

The first non-Indigenous person to discover the Conn Waterhole was William Conn, "a man of vast experience as a pioneer", who found the place "in the early sixties [1860s]". It was thereafter named after him. He did not stay here, however. He and his wife were unlucky enough to be murdered by Indigenous Australians roughly twelve years later in what is now Queensland's Cassowary Coast Region. Conn's Crossing on the Herbert River and Conn Creek, a small stream, which was the site of the aforesaid 1875 Conn murders, lying south of Damper Creek, are also named after the waterhole's discoverer.

According to Ernest Favenc, himself an Australian explorer in the 19th century, William Hodgkinson passed by the townsite with an expedition in 1876. Hodgkinson's route as described in Favenc's 1888 book The History of Australian Exploration from 1788 to 1888 would have taken him right by what was soon to be Collingwood:

...Hodgkinson and party left that place [Cloncurry] in May, 1876, and proceeded across the dividing watershed to the Diamantina River, and followed that river down to below the boundary of the colony of Queensland and South Australia...

Of course, by this time, most of the country west to the Diamantina was already known to White settlers, and indeed, Favenc even mentions that Hodgkinson found cattle tracks all up and down the river. As if to confirm this, an 1874 newspaper article had already reported that "the Diamantina country is nearly all occupied." The newspaper's "informant" further gave a very favourable report about northwest Queensland, saying that it was the finest part of the territory that he had ever seen. Hodgkinson's goal was to "ascertain the extent of pastoral country lying to the west of the future Winton district and along the Diamantina River", and both those geographical criteria would include the Collingwood site. His was the last expedition funded by the Queensland colonial government.

An expedition was undertaken in 1877 by a Mr. Shives (his name appears as Chives in some articles), who made a map "showing the creeks and general features" of the "Diamantina Country" as far as "the junction of Workingham Creek [as it is often spelt in older publications], and the Western River, and Diamantina River, thence to Conn's Waterhole." There was then evidently no town of Collingwood yet, which would later lie on the waterways in question, but the report further said "A township is recommended to be reserved about 3 miles [5 km] above Conn's Waterhole". This was slightly farther down the Western from what turned out to be Collingwood's actual site, but the recommendation was likely to have been the motivation for establishing the town. The name Collingwood was not mentioned. The article also vaunted, often in glowing language, the western country's virtues, saying "Large stations are being taken up daily, and there is every prospect of large and increasing settlement taking place." Mr. Shives's main purpose in undertaking this journey in the Outback was to survey a possible route for a "proposed road from our northwestern country to Cleveland Bay", whose western terminus was to be at the Conn Waterhole.

Explorers and mappers in the Collingwood area

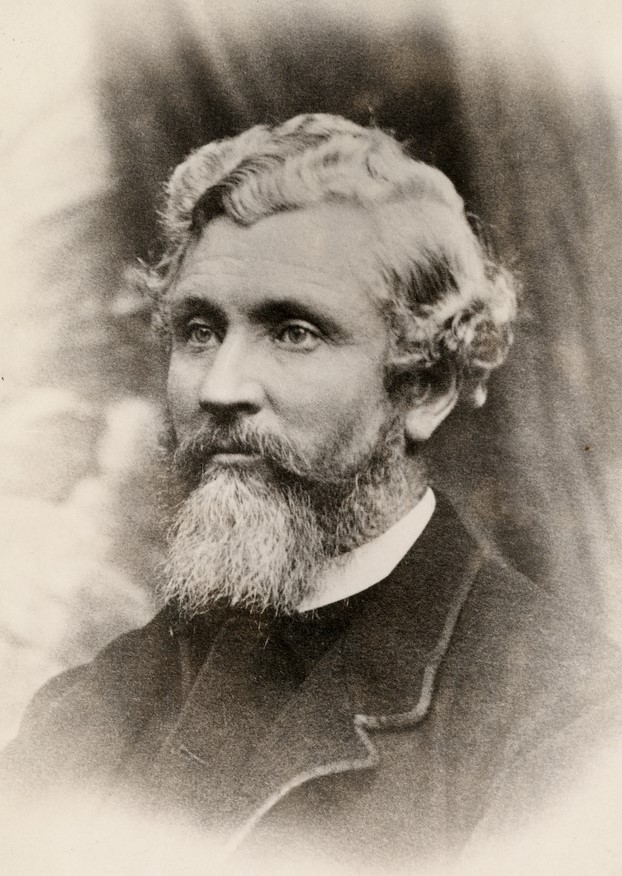
John McKinlay

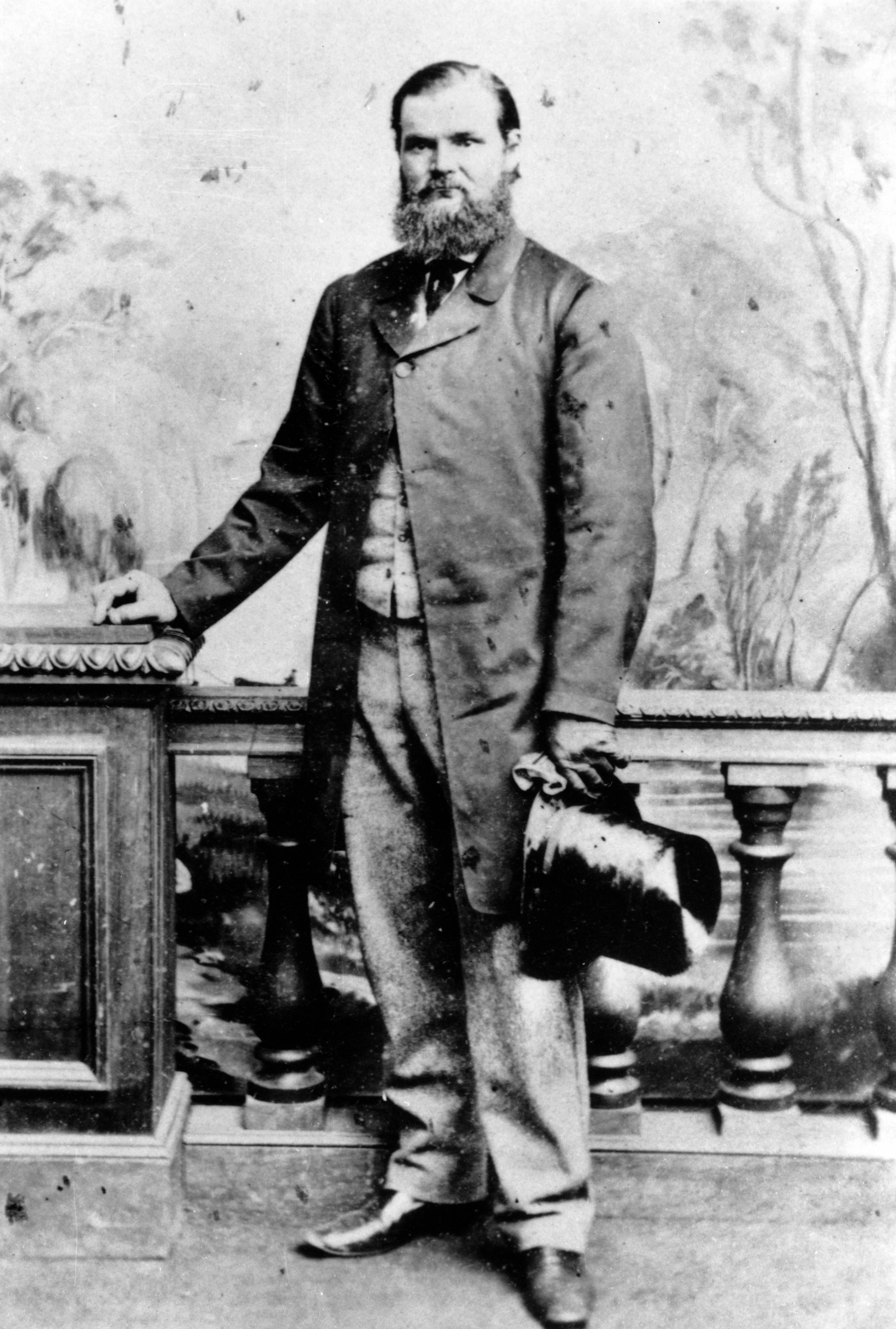
William Landsborough

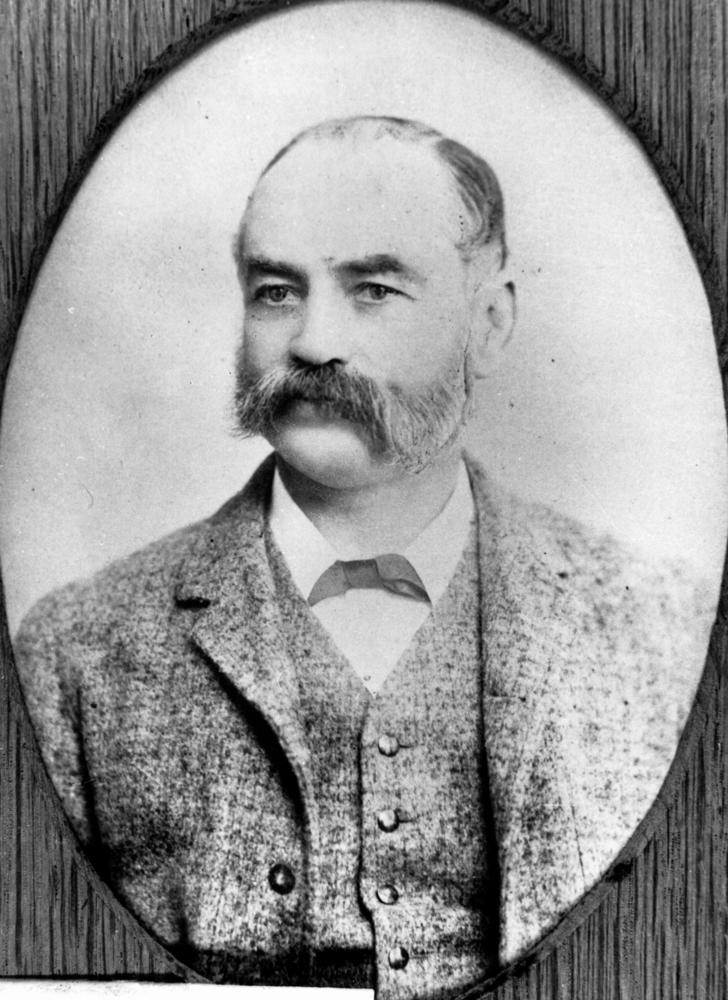
William Hodgkinson

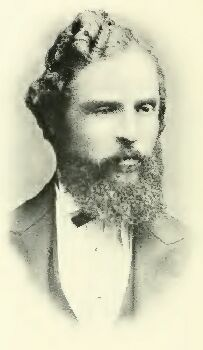
Robert Logan Jack

=== Early European colonisation ===
Even though a summary of Winton's early history stated flatly in 1928 that "A township had been surveyed there [at Collingwood] by the Government surveyor, but it never got any further than that" – which was not altogether true – the seeds for Collingwood's failure as a town were nonetheless sown almost right at the beginning, as William Henry Corfield's written record makes clear. He and some acquaintances set out to do business in this Outback town, only to decide upon arrival in the district that it would be a better idea to found a town somewhat farther east near the Pelican Waterholes, which was to become Winton, Collingwood's rival for regional dominance, and eventually the victor in the struggle.

William Henry Corfield (1843–1927), later the mayor of Winton, mentioned Collingwood in his book Reminiscences of Queensland 1862–1899, published in 1921 (by which time Collingwood had long ceased to exist). After suffering a bout of malaria, he had returned to Queensland after a few months in Sydney in 1878:

Passing through Townsville, I met [Robert] Fitzmaurice, who told me that carrying had fallen away between Cooktown and the Palmer, and that he had left that district. He suggested that I should join with him in carrying to the western country, and added that he had been informed by a squatter that there was a good opening for a store at the Conn Waterhole, on the Diamantina River. This is about forty miles [60 km] down the Western River, from where Winton now is.

The Conn Waterhole to which Corfield referred is a body of water at Collingwood, the northernmost permanent waterhole in the Diamantina basin, and maps still identify it by that name today. It also seems to have been another name for Collingwood itself, as a later passage in Corfield's book makes clear:

Our destination was Collingwood, more widely known as the Conn Waterhole, where the Government Surveyor had laid out a township situated about 40 miles [64 km] west of Winton.

Another man of Corfield's acquaintance, named Thomas Lynett, had left Townsville for the same destination with backing from Burns, Philp and Co. to set up a shop at Collingwood, if he deemed the then newly laid out town to be suitable upon his inspection. Apparently, though, he did not, deciding that the land there was too prone to flooding. He turned back, and eventually, he, Corfield, Fitzmaurice and one further man, a former police sergeant turned shopkeeper, Robert Allen from Aramac agreed to establish a centre east of Corfield's original destination of Collingwood. This was Winton's beginning (and Allen is hailed there as its founder), and this town would prove to be Collingwood's eventual undoing.

Lynett's misgivings about the chosen site for the new town were echoed elsewhere. A correspondent who used the name "Argus" said that nobody cared to build at the Conn Waterhole, wryly adding "...owing to the prejudice many people have against building twenty feet below flood-mark." He furthermore foresaw, correctly, that Winton would eventually become the township that was to grow into the main regional business centre. Another correspondent, identified only as "Outsider", referred to the townsite as the district's "pet grievance" for the danger posed thereto by flooding, and told the story of a would-be shopkeeper and publican who "departed disgusted for some other district" after rejecting the proposed townsite and then trying to build at a spot higher up from the Conn Waterhole at a place called Crosthwaite's Camp (likely named after Benjamin Crosthwaite), but the manager of Elderslie Station objected to this. Indeed, although the man is not named in the article, it might well have been Lynett himself. The station manager was not named, either, but may have been Donald Smith Wallace. "Outsider", too, mentioned that the townsite had been "surveyed and laid out by the Government surveyor".

Corfield and his party were also trying to earn a reward of £50 for opening a new, more direct road into the lands that lay in Queensland's west, but a road party had set out to do just that, and upon catching up with them, Corfield's party discovered what the new road's intended course was to be:

Fitzmaurice, whilst riding after the bullocks, met Mr. Bergin, the man in charge of the [road] party, who told Fitzmaurice that he was instructed to mark a direct line to Collingwood, on the Western River, and that he intended going up Thornhill Creek, cross the divide between the Landsborough and Diamantina Rivers, and then run down Jessamine and Mill's Creeks to the Western River, and thence to Collingwood.

The pastoral industry in the Collingwood area in the late 19th century concentrated on sheep and cattle, and indeed, it still does. It was the cattle that came first. An 1879 news article about lambing on the local stations reported:

Lambing is in full swing on the Wokingham creek and Western river sheep stations, and, as the past season has been a most splendid one, no doubt the result will be very satisfactory.

It was apparently a good year, at least when seen against the conditions that prevailed farther down the Diamantina River, where there had been "little or no rain during the last two years", and while the Diamantina had run (it was often dry), stations there were "sadly off for grass".

An 1877 news article reported "something of the progress of settlement in this far-out district", and referred to the cattle being used to stock the country.

It is now barely two years since the first stock came out to this river [the Diamantina], and already every mile of available country has been secured and partially stocked, from the head down to the South Australian boundary; and the same may be said of most of the largest tributaries, such as the Western River and Wokingham Creek. There are now travelling down the river three mobs of cattle destined to stock country to the west.

Those three streams all flow together at what was to be Collingwood's site, and such glowing reports about the quick success of this "far-out district" may have contributed to the decision to found the town.

=== Collingwood's beginning and struggle to grow ===
There was seemingly little knowledge of the new town of Collingwood in its earliest days, but then, as one correspondent put it, "We are in a state of blissful ignorance respecting the state of the Western country, except the rumours that reach us by the solitary and exhausted trader." The reason for this was that the mail, formerly a fortnightly service at the correspondent's location (Scarrbury – misidentified in the article as Scarborough – about 56 km west of Aramac at 22.93°S 144.7°E, and like Collingwood, a now vanished town), was not running. This undoubtedly is why he was puzzled upon finding this out:

One of the most curious features respecting the Western mail that has come under my notice is that tenders have been called for the conveyance of a mail for the present year from the Flinders River to Conn's Waterhole, on the Diamantina, a locality that there is not a station within 40 miles of, neither is there any individual to receive the mail; the nearest station to the said Waterhole is the property of the present Minister for Works...

Clearly, the correspondent knew nothing of the new town of Collingwood at the site that he named, and it seems equally clear that he lacked the mental wherewithal to realise from the news that had come his way that colonisation must have been spreading to the Diamantina-Western area. He was also a bit more blissfully ignorant than he realised, for Elderslie Station, Collingwood's neighbour, well under 40 miles from the Conn Waterhole (not even one kilometre, in fact), had been established a few years earlier. Whether any building had begun at Collingwood by 8 February 1878, when the article was written, cannot be known from the article's content, but it nonetheless seems clear that plans for the new town were proceeding, for the correspondent was at least right in believing that a postal service to an uninhabited spot would be pointless.

There was more explicit news of Collingwood's founding in an article written only the next month.

The most exciting news I have heard for some time is that a township is to be proclaimed at our celebrated Conn Waterhole (at the junction of the Western and Diamantina), and that Messrs. Clifton and Aplin, of Townsville, intend putting up a large store to supply us with the necessaries and luxuries of life. I am almost afraid the news is too good to be true, although a sure fortune awaits any enterprising firm who would push out at once and start business on a large and liberal scale.

This, however, was only a forthcoming proclamation. Building had yet to begin in earnest, and indeed, the official proclamation only came months later, in October 1878. It was buried in a list in a government gazette and consisted of a few short lines under "RESERVES.— The following reserves are proclaimed : ...", and it read simply "...for township purposes on the Western River, Gregory North District, under the name of Collingwood, resumed from the Doveridge No. 1 Run...". Other proclamations in the list included a quarry in the parish of Takalvan (in the Bundaberg Region) and a cemetery in Nerang.

This proclamation does seem to contradict the version of events as related on the Collingwood Cemetery Marker, which gives the town's establishment date as 1874.

Whenever it was founded, building had definitely begun at Collingwood by early 1880, for a news item mentioned as much in January of that year (although the item was a month old by the time it appeared in The Brisbane Courier). The article described development at the year-and-a-half-old town of Winton as well, but gave no hint of a rivalry between the two towns. Rather, the writer seemed to think that the two of them would complement each other:

The township of Winton is growing in size with wonderful rapidity, and from all appearance I should imagine a rare business was being done both by the storekeepers and publicans. A really good hotel has been opened by Mr. John Urquhart, and as he is a most deservedly popular man he will no doubt do well. The town can now boast of three hotels, two large stores, two butchers' shops, blacksmith, bootmaker, &c. Not bad, considering the place is barely eighteen months old.

The township at the Western [River] crossing (Collingwood) is also going ahead; three houses are nearly finished, which are intended for public houses as soon as they get their licenses; so there will be no lack of "spiritual refreshment" on the Upper Diamantina and Western. A good store ought to pay well at this place, as it would save thirty-five miles [56 km] to anyone coming in from the Lower Diamantina or Herbert districts.

It seems clear from this story, though, that Winton had something of a developmental head start over Collingwood. The census taken the following year also suggested such a thing. In 1881, there were nine persons living in Collingwood, eight male and one female. At the same census, Winton's population was 146, 119 male and 27 female. Perhaps this was further brought home by the sale of Crown lands at Collingwood announced in 1882 in a supplement to the Government Gazette, and reproduced in The Brisbane Courier, to be held on 30 November of that year. There were to be sales of land in several Queensland towns, and 69 town lots in Collingwood were for sale "at upset of £12 per acre". No mention was made of any land for sale in Winton. Another advertisement about this same sale tells the reader that Collingwood lay in the County of Ayrshire and the Parish of Collingwood, and also that the sale's venue was Robinson's Auction Rooms in Winton. It is interesting to note, though, that the sale of the Collingwood Crown lands was held in Winton, not Collingwood.

Late February and early March 1881 brought heavy rains to the region one week, this after a year of "the driest of dry weather". The upshot was that there were quite heavy flows in both the Western and Diamantina rivers, but this was not altogether a boon to the region, much as the thirst for water had been growing, as quite a few dams were washed out, including "a fine dam" at Elderslie, "near the township of Collingwood", although the damage to it was reckoned to be only partial, and could "be repaired at little cost". The late-19th-century rural roads also became very muddy, thwarting travel and communication.

A curious publication appeared in 1885 that seems to suggest that there was an official prejudice towards Collingwood over Winton. A map showing railway development and Cobb and Co's stagecoach routes in Queensland, "compiled & lithographed from official maps", shows the name "Collingwood" printed in an italic typeface, whereas the name "Winton" was obviously written on the map by hand. Clearly, it had been left off the "official maps". Cobb and Co needed to have Winton on the map to show its route leading there from Hughenden, which then continued to Cork – bypassing Collingwood. Collingwood was, however, served by a weekly horse-borne mail run between Winton and Boulia by that same year.

It was also in 1885 that a postal receiving office – not a full post office – was established at "Collingwood, near Winton", in April. As if to foreshadow things to come for the doomed town, the same article mentioned that "the post office at Rocklands has been removed to and is now called Camooweal". The stretch of the postal service between Collingwood and Boulia had its timetable "altered" the very next month (but service was not "extended" or "decreased", as with several other mail runs in Queensland mentioned in the article), perhaps in connection with the new receiving office.

A Brisbane newspaper, in an item dated 25 January 1886, described the weather in the region as "still unsettled" and said that there had been "½in." (roughly 13 mm) of rain at Collingwood that week. It was apparently "still fearfully hot" at the time of writing.

The 1886 Queensland Census gave the rather dire impression that Collingwood had already been given up by that time. No population was reported for Collingwood in the results. However, this may have been mostly due to problems conducting the census. The list included a great many other places that had seemingly been given up. One of these was Clifton, but that still exists today, unlike Collingwood.

Beset though the region often was (and still is) by drought, there was enough of a flow in the Western River on 24 January 1887 to cause a rather unfortunate accident. A Mr. Roydell from nearby Brighton Downs station, 150 km southwest of the town, was trying to swim across the river at Collingwood when one of his horses was swept away by the current and sank. All efforts to rescue the horse, or at least salvage the valuable saddle that it was wearing, failed. Mr. Roydell, however, was not injured.

A happier story unfolded in 1895 when "a lad named Fleetwood", who had supposedly drowned in recent floods at nearby Elderslie, was found alive near Collingwood. He had gone eleven days without food, the last seven of those up a tree.

The postal arrangements at Collingwood had changed within a few years. The new arrangement that was to go into effect on 1 January 1890 would serve "Elderslie and Cork, via Collingwood, Conn's [Waterhole], and Police Barracks", but it was still done by horse alone, not stagecoach, and it was still only weekly. The work was contracted for two years to "Macartney and Percy, Diamantina Lakes, Winton" for £195 yearly. This may reflect development in Winton rather than Collingwood, for Diamantina Lakes Station – nowadays a national park – actually lay somewhat nearer the latter than the former, but was nonetheless identified here as an outlying centre of Winton.

The Australian native police post mentioned above (22.7684°S 142.1109°E), some 65 km southwest of Collingwood, had, in fact, been forsaken by this time. It lay down the Diamantina from the town, but it was "broken up" by March 1882, leaving "a stretch of 70 miles [113 km] – Collingwood to Cork – and no place to recruit ration bags." The troopers had all been transferred to Cloncurry to the northwest.

The Great Shearers' Strike came in 1891, disrupting the wool industry for a while. One of the "momentous decisions by the Federated Pastoralists" (the management side in the strike) on 18 March that year was to declare a great number of stations in the Collingwood area "non-union", including Elderslie just to the north of town, and also Ayrshire Downs (21.97°S 142.72°E) up Wokingham Creek, Dagworth up the Diamantina River, Warnambool Downs (22.81°S 142.83°E) southeast of town and Llanrheidol (22.28°S 141.60°E) west of town. "This means that no loading consigned to those stations during this week will be allowed to be forwarded by union teams", the article asserted. Later, on nearby Elderslie Station, which belonged to absentee landlord Sir Samuel Wilson at the time, the woolshed was burnt down on 8 October that year.

Queensland's 1891 census did not mention Collingwood at all, although it did mention Winton, which lay in the same census district (Marathon). However, the crime story below clearly indicates that there was still a Collingwood two years later.

A major storm in January 1894 brought much needed rain to Central West Queensland. As a result of the downpour, several of the Western River's braided channels were running, as were three on the Diamantina into which it flowed at Collingwood. The news article about this storm ended by declaring "Splendid rain has fallen on several parts of Elderslie run, particularly in the vicinity of Collingwood."

Later in 1894, Collingwood – and Winton too – once again found themselves in the middle of a hotbed of discontent as the Second Shearers' Strike wore on. There were unfortunate incidents in the Collingwood area. At neighbouring Elderslie Station, a great haystack was set ablaze, while farther up the Diamantina, at Dagworth Station, the shearing shed was burnt down by strikers armed with guns. Another woolshed was set afire at Manuka (21.717°S 143.400°E), about halfway between Collingwood and Hughenden. A map at the same source shows the "Scene of Recent Outrages" (the strikers did not have the press on their side), with Collingwood clearly marked. It is worth noting, however, that the town's name is rendered in lowercase, whereas nearby Winton has its name in uppercase. It is likely that the strike did not help with Collingwood's economy at the time, as one of the local industries was for a while brought to a standstill.

Collingwood and the surrounding area – notably Elderslie Station – also have their place in the annals of Australian crime. In 1893, a man named Harry Ward, a stockman from Dagworth Station (although the article describes him as a "swagman") in Robert Macpherson's employ (see Collingwood races below), was accused and eventually convicted of killing a sixteen-year-old Indigenous boy named Charlie at Elderslie after an evening of drinking in nearby Collingwood. A constable named P. Duffy diligently tracked him down over a distance of 159 miles (256 km) as Ward was trying to flee to South Australia, a deed that took Duffy eight days. Ward was eventually found guilty of manslaughter and sentenced to 15 years' hard labour on St Helena Island. Ward earned himself the epithet "the Western Queensland slayer".

Queensland's 1901 census – there was no census in 1896 – listed Collingwood among those towns and township reserves whose population was below 100, but it did not go as far as to say that the town had been given up.

=== People ===
Little is known about Collingwood's townsfolk, much of the knowledge coming from the cemetery records that have survived – and there are only eight of those. Two of those buried at the former graveyard – both of them babies (which in itself says something about infant mortality in late colonial Australia) – bore the name Tranby. This same name figured in an 1890 newspaper report that mentioned a horse and buggy accident on the road from Winton to Collingwood. The buggy was driven by a Mr. Tranby – his first name is not given – and he was driving a party to Collingwood, apparently to attend the races (see Collingwood races below), when it "came to grief" and the buggy's forecarriage was torn right off "horses and all", throwing everybody out of the buggy. Nobody was badly hurt, but the party had to spend the night in the bush. The report, perhaps meaning to incite sensation, mentioned that the overnight party included a young lady. It is also interesting to note that Mr. Tranby had apparently been in Winton on business, suggesting that by 1890, Winton was already outshining Collingwood as the region's commercial hub.

The Tranby children, Reginald Francis, who died at the age of 7½ months on 6 February 1891, and James Patrick, who died at the age of 9 months and three days on 23 December 1889, have their parents' names recorded as Peter (quite possibly the hapless buggy driver mentioned above) and Bridget, née Burke. Reginald was born at Collingwood, whereas his brother James's short life began at nearby Ayrshire Downs. Thomas Toombs and his wife Sarah Jane, née Powell, also had an unnamed baby son buried at Collingwood who lived only seven hours on 10 November 1882.

Of the people whose faraway origins are mentioned, two came from England (Thomas Gravestock, died 23 February 1882 at age 49; Richard Fitzgerald from Woolwich, died 1 November 1881, purportedly at age 132, although the plaque on the Collingwood Cemetery Marker gives his age as "unknown"), and two from Ireland (James Driscoll, died 2 February 1883 roughly at age 54; Patrick Phair, died 6 January 1884 at age 39).

Another man, William Paget, apparently died in December 1891, aged roughly 60, but was not buried at Collingwood Cemetery until 23 May the next year. No explanation is given for this. The plaque there mentions that it is likely that there are further, unknown burials at the old cemetery for which records have not survived.

At Christmas in 1897, an article in The Capricornian, relayed from 15 December issue of the Winton Herald, mentioned a man named Mr. Louis Webber, "formerly of the Western Hotel at Collingwood". He had "left last week for the south". This was late in the town's history, and Webber was part of an exodus that would continue. Peter Tranby, mentioned above, apparently moved to Cairns after leaving Collingwood. He died there, aged 58 or 59 (sources differ), on 26 April 1918. The Tranbys were already in Cairns before the turn of the century. Another record mentions that Bridget Tranby, who was from Ireland and who worked in Cairns as a laundress, died in 1898 of burns to her body and legs. The same record says that she and her husband Peter had six children, but only two reached their majority. Given that the Tranbys wed on 18 March 1889 – possibly in Collingwood – it would seem that the norms of Victorian morality were not in full force in this remote part of the Empire, for Mrs. Tranby was surely in the late stages of pregnancy with son James Patrick by the time of the wedding, his birthdate having presumably been 20 March 1889.

If a storyteller named Hazelton Brock can be believed, Collingwood had at least one Indigenous inhabitant, who was known as Boomerang Jack. Brock claimed to be the one who had kidnapped Jack on the occasion of a punitive massacre at Skull Hole on the upper Mistake Creek on Bladensburg Station in the early 1870s ("There must have been over two hundred blacks killed on that day") after some men from the boy's group had murdered a White man and robbed his party of some supplies, and he furthermore claimed to have raised Jack.

The name W. T. Strutton appears in the historical record as a would-be innkeeper at Collingwood. He announced his intention on 10 December 1879 to open a public house called The St. Helen's Hotel in the new town, and to apply for the needed licence at the monthly licensing meeting to be held on 10 February 1880. He lived at the time in Aramac, and whether he ever moved to Collingwood and undertook such a business is unknown, but he did claim in his legal notice that the house that he meant to use as his inn was under his ownership. Nonetheless, one historical record mentions that there were two hotels in Collingwood, but neither one had that name. There is a bit of confusion about this as initial reports on the town's progress mention three hotel buildings, and more than two names are mentioned in what records survive. One hotel apparently bore the name Western Hotel, but other articles mention further names. One is Mrs. G. Martin, who according to one report (see Collingwood races below) ran the Bushman's Arms Hotel.

When a local pastoralist who was prominent in business, horseracing, history, and perhaps even legend, died in 1930, his obituary mentioned a man named Mick Cunningham, who was said to have been a hotel owner in Collingwood.

Also named in an 1885 article as an innkeeper at Collingwood was a man identified as "Old Crawley", apparently from Aramac. The article further implies that the spot chosen for the town was determined by Old Crawley's choice of a location for his public house. No date is given for Old Crawley's arrival at the Conn Waterhole, but it is clear that this happened before the Government surveyor had laid out the township. This would mean that Old Crawley's inn was built before Corfield and his fellow businessmen came to set up shop at Collingwood in 1878, only to think better of it, for the survey had been done by then.

=== Collingwood races ===
In its heyday, Collingwood held races that were attended by crowds that were rather small, even with some race enthusiasts coming in from Winton. The first races were held "at the Conn Hole" on 1 and 2 October 1878, after the formation of the "Never Never Amateur Jockey Club". Attendance was "pretty good" according to the correspondent "Argus" mentioned above, especially as many men from nearby stations could not make it because they were busy with sheep shearing.

"A Correspondent", who was not named, described races held exactly seven years later – and mentioned a few other things about Collingwood – in an 1885 newspaper article:

Our Collingwood races came off last Thursday and Friday, 1st and 2nd October. The amount run for was £103 18s., which was mostly subscribed in our little town and in Winton, the Winton people assisting very well, as our townspeople always subscribe to their race meeting. The races were very successful considering the programme was not advertised or carried out as it ought to be according to racing rules. We had a fair attendance for the races, numbering between sixty and seventy people, several from Winton, and a few from Elderslie. Collingwood has two hotels and a small store – no private residences, only a few calico houses – on the banks of the Western.

The two-day event ended with a camel race, which the correspondent said "drew more attraction than any other part of the sport". The camels had been brought to Collingwood from South Australia ten days earlier by a "Bombay man". The settling took place, the article said, at Mrs. G. Martin's Bushman's Arms Hotel.

Races at Collingwood on Saint Patrick's Day 1887 were mentioned in an article in The Morning Bulletin published in Rockhampton on 25 March. The meeting apparently did not draw universal interest.

Several of the sporting men went to Collingwood, where races were held. The attendance was small, but everything passed off well. The principal event fell to Anonyma, the property of Mr. Macpherson, of Dagworth, one of the most enthusiastic sportsmen of the district, and always a popular winner. Very little interest was taken in the meeting here [in Winton], the general impression being that most of the horses were only out for an airing.

As an interesting side note, "Mr. Macpherson, of Dagworth" was Christina Macpherson's brother Robert ("Bob"), who was not only a racing enthusiast, as witnessed by both his attendance at the Collingwood races and his cofounding of the Kynuna Race Club near Dagworth Station twelve years later in 1899, but also the man commonly identified as "the squatter" in the poem and song "Waltzing Matilda". Indeed, Robert Macpherson's 1930 obituary in The Longreach Leader mentioned his participation at the Collingwood races (and confirmed that Collingwood no longer existed by the time of his death) and his breeding and racing of several winners. The obituary did not mention Anonyma, but it did say that one of Mr. Macpherson's winners had been called Nameless. There is a correspondence in literal meaning between these two names, but it is unknown whether they were the same horse. The obituary also mentioned Banjo Paterson's stay at Dagworth and the inspiration that he had drawn there.

Another race meeting at Collingwood in 1889, likewise held on Saint Patrick's Day, was mentioned in another article in that same newspaper on 27 March of that year. This only drew a few spectators and there were not many starters, perhaps, as the correspondent thought, owing to the dryness of the weather. Nonetheless, races were run in this one-day event, and the settling-up was done that evening at the Welcome Hotel. The correspondent, reporting from Winton, also mentioned that the weather in that part of Queensland had been very dry lately.

No change has taken place with regard to the weather, which still remains very hot and dry. The grass being parched with the heat, the country is completely bare for miles. If rain is not forthcoming soon the town [Winton] will be in a worse state than it has been for years.

The same article also mentions that one of the horses at the races that day was Disraeli, owned by P. Tranby, likely the same Peter Tranby mentioned earlier. Disraeli won his first race (1 mile, or 1600 m), but not his next (¾ mile, or 1200 m). Also owned by P. Tranby were Baby and Cunnamulla, neither of whom won that day. The racetrack was evidently quite narrow, as each race involved only three horses.

Saint Patrick's Day, 17 March, seemed to be a regular date for holding the Collingwood races. Notwithstanding what it says above, however, in 1889, another article reported that they were held on 18 March, likely because Saint Patrick's Day fell on a Sunday that year.

The Capricornian, another Rockhampton newspaper, reported that there was trouble at the Collingwood races on one occasion in 1890:

The races at Collingwood were fairly attended; there was plenty of rowdyism in spite of the posse of policemen in attendance. The police were kept busy having to discard "drunks", who were numerous, and attend to more serious affairs. Several arrests resulted.

This came in the wake of another newspaper's declaration that the forthcoming Collingwood races were not exciting much interest that year owing to the recent flooding and attendant problems that that posed to travellers.

=== Collingwood's decline and fall ===
Drought was indeed a serious problem in the region at various times, one that might have destroyed the nearby town of Winton, had one drought in 1895 been as dire an emergency as one geologist believed. Robert Logan Jack (see Geology and palaeontology above) wrote in that year of an eventuality in his Geological Survey, Bulletin no. 1, Artesian Water in the Western Interior of Queensland, that might have saved Collingwood from what would turn out to be its actual fate. The drought striking the region had seriously depleted the waterhole on Mistake Creek, upon which Winton wholly depended for its water, leaving, Jack reckoned, only three weeks' to a month's supply of water for that town. He foresaw that it might become necessary to move Winton's whole population, along with their livestock, to the Conn Waterhole at Collingwood. This, however, never came about. Mirroring history, a similar plan emerged for drought-stricken Cloncurry well over a century later, in 2014.

Even though an atlas dating from 1901 identified the lands abutting the town as "Excellent Country", and even though traffic had to be diverted through the town in 1885 owing to drought along the usual road, putting Collingwood on the main road for a while, Collingwood never achieved its goal of regional dominance, mainly because of competition for this status from the town of Winton to the east. The railway reached there in 1899, and Collingwood, which had never truly prospered throughout its few decades of existence, became a ghost town by about 1900. Curiously, a map published in 1925 "for the Commissioner of Railways, Brisbane", years after the town's abandonment, showed that a westward railway extension from Winton to the Collingwood area was "under construction", and further, that Parliament had approved a further extension to this line to a point about halfway between Diamantina Lakes and Selwyn, where it was to form a junction with another approved but yet to be built line running from Quilpie northwest to Camooweal. None of this, however, was actually built, but had it been, it might have revived Collingwood's fortunes.

== Collingwood today ==
Today, no buildings are standing, and satellite views reveal only an undifferentiated patch of Channel Country scenery. The town's former location today lies within the locality of Middleton, whose like-named centre, lying some 101 km to the west, is itself a depopulated (but not altogether deserted) town. The town of Collingwood is memorialized in the Collingwood Cemetery Marker, which is about the only physical trace left of Collingwood. A rough-hewn stone with a plaque fastened onto it lists eight persons known to be buried there.

Even though Collingwood passed into history more than a century ago, geographical details of the town still appear on some maps, even on modern online mapping services. At least one of these shows a small street grid, complete with street names. The Gazetteer of Australia also still lists Collingwood, twice. One entry describes it as a "parish" and the other as an "unbounded locality", but the coordinates given for both are 22.333333°S 142.533333°E, about 180 m west-southwest of the point defined by those at the top of this article, but still well within the old townsite.

Collingwood's site has not been utterly forgotten. Tourist literature for the Winton area mentions angling as a worthwhile activity at the Conn Waterhole, with one brochure even describing it as a "pretty picnic spot". A 2010 doctoral thesis whose fieldwork involved fish populations and movement in far western Queensland identified bony bream, silver tandan, golden perch and golden tank goby as fish found at the Conn Waterhole.

The name Collingwood is still used locally by more than one entity. The area at the old townsite and the Conn Waterhole is a pastoral property (it is thus described in a 1938 obituary) called the Collingwood Reserve, and a local grazier holds a property nearby that likewise bears the name. A newspaper story from 1942 even mentioned both in one sentence. The "waterhole in the Western River on the Collingwood Reserve" in this article is, of course, the Conn Waterhole. Mapcarta identifies the former townsite as a "farm" named Collingwood, while OpenStreetMap identifies the facility at 22.343444°S 142.526436°E lying somewhat more than a kilometre south-southwest of the former townsite, clearly visible in satellite images, as the local grazier's "Collingwood" property. This, however, lies just across the boundary in the locality of Opalton. What follows is a table of pastoral homesteads found today near (that is, within 70 km of) Collingwood. Coördinates are drawn from the Gazetteer of Australia and often indicate a spot several hundred metres from the actual homestead. The only exceptions are Boolbie House, Castle Hill, Gallipoli and Gurley Out Station, whose coördinates are drawn from Mapcarta, along with Apache Downs, Cork, Donald Downs, Nadjayamba, Namarva and Webb, whose coördinates are drawn from Google Maps. The bearing in each case is a compass direction expressed in degrees, with 0° as north, and proceeding clockwise (and thus, for example, east is 90°). In each case, the bearing is as seen from Collingwood, and it is rounded to the nearest degree. The position used for Collingwood in each calculation is the one at the top of the article, which represents a spot at the intersection of Summer Street and Winter Street (although these exist only in records; there is no trace of them on the ground). All distances and bearings are as the crow flies.

Homesteads Within 70 km of Collingwood
Name	Position	Dist. (km)	Bearing	Remarks
Albrighton	22.000000000°S 142.399993896°E	39.5	339°	
Aldingham	22.279583757°S 143.205422279°E	69.2	85°	
Alni	22.149999618°S 142.483337402°E	21.0	345°	Rendered "Anli" in some sources; Sauropodomorpha fossils found
Amelia Downs	22.049999237°S 142.550003051°E	31.5	3°	Owners lost an appeal against a Department of Lands rental valuation in 1995, despite effects of drought.
Apache Downs	21.843089388°S 142.721052382°E	57.7	19°	Not in Gazetteer of Australia
Ascot	21.733329772°S 142.516662597°E	66.7	358°	
Athlestane	22.783330917°S 142.949996948°E	65.8	140°	
Ayrshire Downs	21.966669082°S 142.716674804°E	44.9	25°	James Patrick Tranby's birthplace; woolshed burnt down in Second Shearers' Strike; Thomas McIlwraith visited twice (1881 & 1885)
Balranald	22.350000381°S 142.716674804°E	18.8	96°	
Belfield	21.833330154°S 142.933334350°E	69.1	37°	
Bendemeer	21.899999618°S 142.416671752°E	49.7	346°	
Bernfels	21.933330535°S 142.633331298°E	45.6	13°	
Bladensburg	22.516666412°S 143.033340454°E	55.2	112°	Former homestead; now a national park information centre; site of massacre of Indigenous Australians at Skull Hole in 1870s
Boolbie House	22.173300000°S 141.928000000°E	64.9	286°	Not in Gazetteer of Australia
Brooklyn	21.783330917°S 142.816665649°E	67.7	25°	Bought by T. J. Ryan's state government in 1916 as part of state business activities, along with many other properties.
Camara	22.149999618°S 143.050003051°E	56.8	69°	
Carella	22.216669082°S 142.933334350°E	43.0	73°	Rendered "Corella" in some sources
Carisbrooke	22.649999618°S 142.516662597°E	35.3	183°	Site of Lyndon B. Johnson's 1942 emergency landing; still a cattle and sheep station but now also a tourism facility
Castle Hill	22.129900000°S 142.283800000°E	35.3	311°	Subject of a native title application by the Koa people lodged on 24 May 1999, separate from the one listed above. Not in Gazetteer of Australia
Cathedral Hill	22.000000000°S 142.199996948°E	50.8	317°	
Colane	22.416669845°S 142.733337402°E	22.5	115°	
Collingwood	22.350000381°S 142.550003051°E	2.5	141°	Property mentioned in foregoing paragraph; Gazetteer coördinates badly off mark
Colston	22.783330917°S 142.716674804°E	53.5	160°	
Congewoi	21.799999237°S 142.283325195°E	64.7	336°	
Cooinda	21.916669845°S 142.866668701°E	57.5	37°	Site of early, highly successful artesian bore (1896)
Cork	22.925296588°S 142.3110472848°E	69.8	199°	Bought by Thomas McIlwraith and Joseph Smyth in 1875; named after latter's birthplace; Hugh McDonald's song The Diamantina Drover tells a story set at the former (now abandoned) homestead, which is now in need of restoration.
Cotswold Hills	22.549999237°S 142.666671752°E	57.5	151°	
Dagworth	21.866670608°S 142.149993896°E	65.3	323°	Late-19th-century owner raced winners at Collingwood; famous for Waltzing Matilda; woolshed burnt down in Second Shearers' Strike
Donald Downs	21.755234860°S 142.455586746°E	64.8	353°	Not in Gazetteer of Australia
Elderslie	22.283330917°S 142.466674804°E	8.9	308°	Existed in Collingwood's time; woolshed burnt down in Great Shearers' Strike; home to Matilda Site; once owned by Samuel Wilson
Farewell	21.933330535°S 142.333328247°E	49.0	335°	
Gallipoli	22.516700000°S 142.600000000°E	21.5	162°	Not in Gazetteer of Australia
Glenusk	22.250000000°S 142.750000000°E	24.0	67°	
Goolma	22.366670608°S 142.583328247°E	5.7	127°	
The Grove	22.333330154°S 142.633331298°E	10.1	90°	
Gurley Out Station	22.216700000°S 142.400000000°E	19.0	313°	Rendered "Curley Out Station" in some sources; not visible in satellite imagery; not in Gazetteer of Australia
Hexham	22.083330154°S 143.116668701°E	66.0	65°	
Jarvisfield	22.516670227°S 142.583328247°E	21.0	166°	Once owned by Robert Towns
Kalkadoon	22.500000000°S 142.366668701°E	25.4	223°	Like-named artesian bore water facility nearby (22.522637°S 142.351547°E)
Karoola	22.083330154°S 142.500000000°E	28.0	353°	
Lana Downs	22.000000000°S 143.100006103°E	69.0	58°	
Leeson	22.183330535°S 142.750000000°E	27.7	53°	
Lilford	21.866670608°S 142.899993896°E	64.0	36°	
Lovelle Downs	22.149999618°S 142.533325195°E	20.3	0°	Site of exploratory oil well; Sauropodomorpha fossils found
Mountain View	22.450000762°S 143.149993896°E	64.6	102°	
Mount Campbell	21.966669082°S 142.483337402°E	41.0	353°	
Myrall	22.083330154°S 142.766662597°E	36.6	41°	
Nadjayamba	22.383291656°S 142.834701828°E	31.3	100°	Site of Ansett-ANA Flight 149 crash in 1966; not in Gazetteer of Australia
Namarva	22.833000000°S 142.733000000°E	59.2	160°	Owners went droving for two years owing to drought (2013–2015); not in Gazetteer of Australia
Narangie	22.266670227°S 142.649993896°E	13.9	58°	
Nareen House	22.783330917°S 142.466674804°E	50.6	188°	
Nuken	21.833330154°S 142.366668701°E	58.2	343°	
Oondooroo	22.166669845°S 143.149993896°E	65.9	74°	Location for film Banjo & Matilda (released 2016); riot and attempted arson at woolshed in Second Shearers' Strike
Owens Creek	22.383329391°S 142.433334350°E	11.9	242°	Not visible in satellite imagery
Prubi	22.084133148°S 143.131439208°E	67.3	66°	Actually a railway station, but a homestead is visible there on satellite
Rangelands	22.266670227°S 143.050003051°E	53.5	82°	
Robins	22.166669845°S 142.333328247°E	27.8	312°	
Strathbowen	21.866670608°S 142.266662597°E	58.8	332°	
Strathfillan	22.116670608°S 142.850006103°E	40.4	54°	Like-named artesian bore water facility nearby (22.133333206°S 142.833328247°E)
Suvla	22.566669464°S 142.533325195°E	26.0	180°	
Talkara	21.916669845°S 142.750000000°E	51.3	26°	
Tatong	22.916669845°S 142.716674804°E	67.5	164°	
Teviot	22.233329772°S 142.783325195°E	27.8	67°	
Thymania	22.816669464°S 142.716674804°E	56.9	161°	
Tranby	22.666669845°S 142.399993896°E	39.6	200°	Owner drove Holden from Queensland to Yorkshire by way of Timbuktu (1950s)
Tulmur	22.649999618°S 142.250000000°E	45.8	220°	
Warnambool Downs	22.816669464°S 142.833328247°E	61.9	150°	Once had opal mines
Webb	22.028815631°S 142.943391292°E	54.0	51°	Not in Gazetteer of Australia
Werna	21.833330154°S 142.716674804°E	58.6	19°	Resident justice of the peace (1920s); Thomas McIlwraith visited in 1885
Weston	22.100000381°S 142.649993896°E	28.5	25°	
Whyrallah	22.766670227°S 142.366668701°E	51.2	200°	
Winderere	22.383329391°S 142.833328247°E	31.2	100°	Rendered "Windermere" in some sources
Wongan	21.799999237°S 142.550003051°E	59.3	1°	
Woodstock	22.266670227°S 141.949996948°E	60.6	277°	Diamantina River ring feature investigation site; once owned by Robert Towns
Wybenia	21.799999237°S 142.600006103°E	59.6	6°	

These homesteads lie in all directions from the former townsite, although there is a notable dearth of them to Collingwood's southwest. Some of these homesteads already existed in Collingwood's heyday, but others are newer. The name Suvla, for instance, likely refers to the landing that figured in the Battle of Gallipoli in the First World War, an event that took place after Collingwood's abandonment.

== See also ==
- Elderslie Station — a still extant sheep and cattle station whose homestead lies less than 10 km from Collingwood, and which existed when there was actually a town at Collingwood.
- Diamantina River ring feature — a geological structure and possible asteroid impact site discovered in 2015 on whose eastern edge Collingwood lay.
