= Kynuna Station =

Pastoral lease in Queensland

Coordinates: 21.734444°S 141.966949°E

Location in Queensland

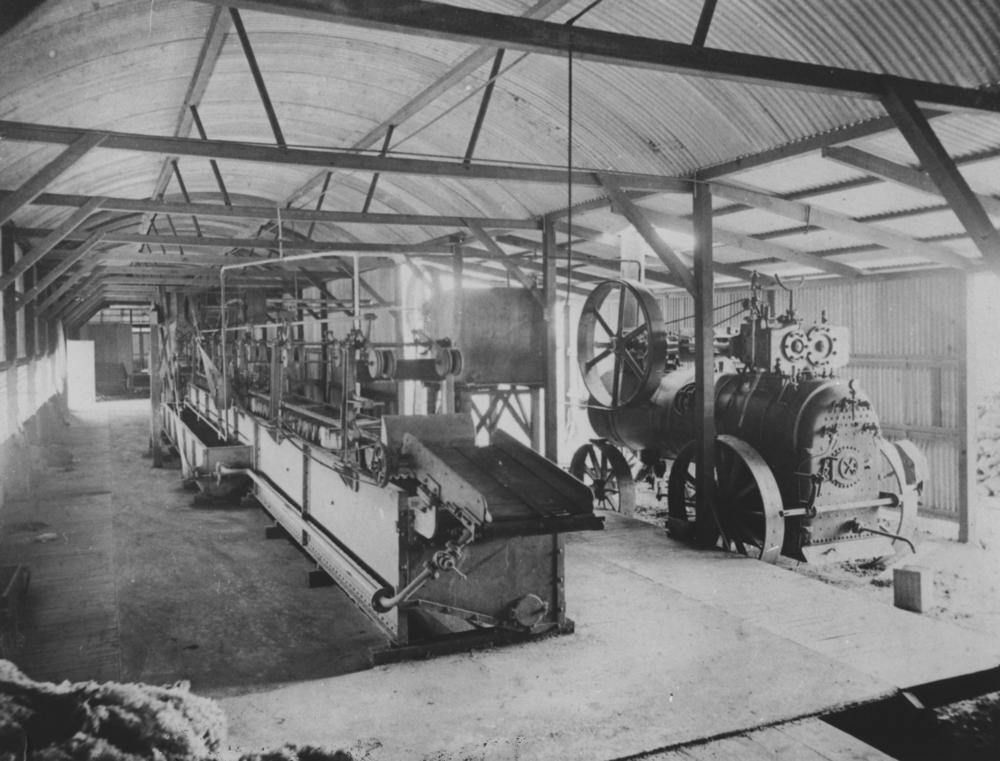
Kynuna wool scours 1908

Kynuna Station also known as Kynuna is a pastoral lease that operates as a cattle station in Queensland, Australia.

== Description ==
The station is located about 81 kilometres (50 mi) north east of Middleton and 122 kilometres (76 mi) south east of Julia Creek in Central West Queensland. It is located in the Channel Country among the headwaters of the Diamantina.

It occupies an area of 1,406 square kilometres (543 sq mi) and carries about 8,000 head of cattle depending on the season. Kynuna and Dagworth Station operate as a single entity and employ a manager and about six staff. The township of Kynuna is situated across the river from the station.

Composed of open plains vegetated with Mitchell grass interspersed with areas of Gidyea, coolibah and Boree woodlands, it is bordered by the river at the northeastern boundary of the property for a distance of over 40 miles (64 km).

Kynuna Station lies at the northern rim of a roughly circular zone measuring some 130 km across that has been identified by Geoscience Australia as a crustal anomaly. Proof is currently lacking as to the cause, but it is believed likely that the anomaly was caused by an asteroid strike that happened about 300 million years ago.

== History ==
The property was established prior to 1878 when it was owned by the Wilson Brothers who were Victorians as were many of the property owners in the area at the time. Messrs Wilson and Colt sold the station in 1882 to Mr. A. K. Finlay when the property had an area 450 square miles (1,165 km^{2}) and was carrying 600 cattle.

The entire area was struck by drought from 1884 to 1886 but undeterred Edmund Jowett thought the property would be a wise investment and by 1886 the property had been acquired by Messrs Jowett and Co. and the switch had been made to grazing sheep, with a flock of 16,000 transferred to Kynuna late in that year.

Wool scouring hands went on strike at Kynuna in 1892 and free labourers were summoned to Winton and then onto the station to take over from the work. The police arrived prior to the labourers but no trouble was reported. Later the same year the area was struck by drought and sheep were moved to Eulolo and Eastern Creek to obtain water and feed. The land on Kynuna was described as being as of "deplorable appearance, not a vestige of grass to be seen anywhere" by July the following year when shearing took place. Surprisingly lambing that year was described as very good and 40 men filled a full board for shearing. 15,000 wethers (castrated male sheep) were sold from the station for a southern buyer in 1894.

Industrial trouble was brewing in Queensland in 1894 with arbitration being required between shearers and pastoralists. Strikes at many stations were being called and a cook at Kynuna was not allowed to accept the terms offered by the pastoralist and trouble was anticipated. A new agreement was offered which shearers refused to sign, effectively striking. Free labourers were brought in from Queensland to assume the workload of the striking shearers.

One of the first artesian bores at Kynuna was drilled in 1896 with water being struck at a depth of 1,708 feet (521 m), producing a flow of about 600,000 imperial gallons (2,727,654 L) daily. Drought struck once more and 60,000 sheep were lost in 1897 and again in 1903.

The fourth bore was sunk in 1898 when the property had a total area of 686 square miles (1,777 km^{2}) and by which time it had been completely surrounded by other established pastoral runs, with Dagworth to the east, Quambelook and Hamilton Downs to the north east, Toorak and Eulolo to the north and Strathearn and Llanrhetdol to the south. The property was carrying about 200,000 sheep at the time and was being managed by Adam Black who had recently replaced Mr S. McCowan who had managed the property for many years.

Another drought struck in 1902 when Jowett had to send away 81,000 of 82,000 sheep on the property for fear all the stock would die.

In 1911 the property was sold by Edmund Jowett to the Scottish Australian Investment Company. At this stage Kynuna occupied an area of 668 square miles (1,730 km^{2}) and was "regarded as one of the finest stations in the district" with seven artesian bores. The sale included an undisclosed number of sheep which was thought to be over 120,000 head and the price was estimated at £160,000.

Sold again in 1912 to Frank Bond of Tasmania, Kynuna was described as the "largest pastoral property in the Winton district". It was estimated that 250,000 sheep would be shorn at Kynuna that season.

Shearing was held up in 1947 after shearers alleged a sheep with scabby mouth was yarded, the animal was quarantined but shearers refused to return to work for the remainder of the day.

The area was severely flooded in 1953 following heavy rain and the Diamantina River broke its banks spreading out a couple of kilometres on either side.

The station manager, R. A. Wall campaigned strongly in 1953 for a dingo barrier fence to be constructed in Central Queensland after dingos had wreaked havoc with the flocks in the area. Hall had stated that "Kynuna had gone out of sheep and others had to walk off their properties with a few hundred pounds, owing to the dingoes".

The property was purchased by the North Australian Pastoral Company in 1996 shortly after the company had purchased neighbouring Dagworth Station in 1995.

== See also ==
- List of ranches and stations
