= Elderslie Station =

Pastoral lease in Queensland

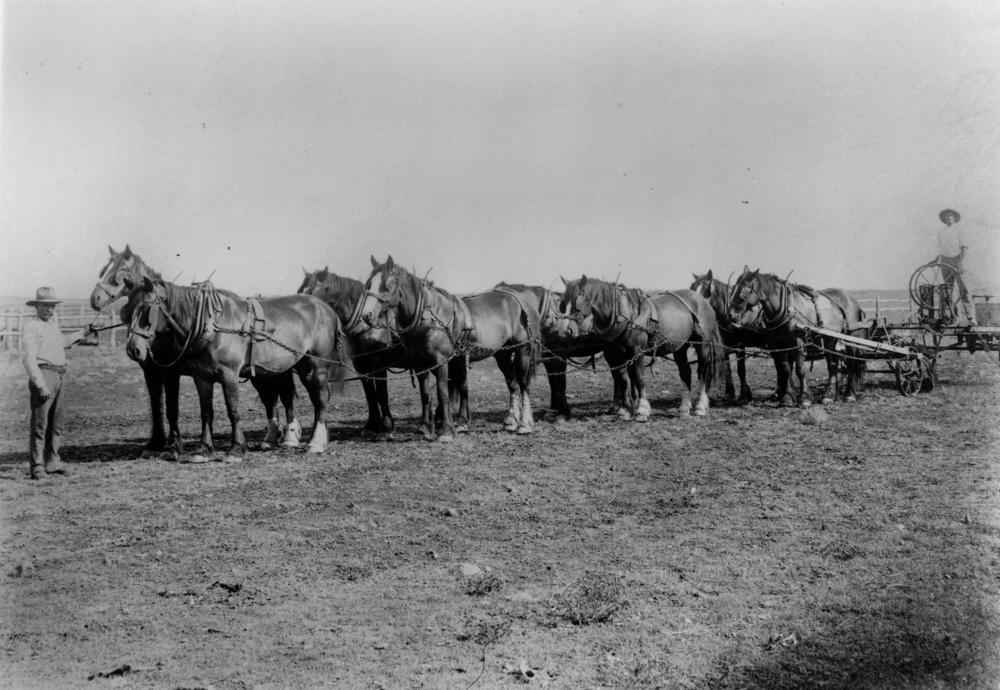
- ] Station team at work on Elderslie]

- Coordinates: 22.29042°S 142.47256°E
- Country: Australia
- State: Queensland

Elderslie Station, also known as Elderslie, is a pastoral lease that operates as a sheep and cattle station in Queensland, Australia.

== Description ==
The station is located about 60 kilometres (37 mi) west of Winton and 95 km (59 mi) east of Middleton in Central West Queensland. It is located in the Channel Country and is bisected from north to south by the Diamantina River. The north east corner is well watered by Wokingham Creek. For a few decades in the late 19th century, there was another town right near the station called Collingwood, but this had become a ghost town by 1900.

Composed of open plains vegetated with Mitchell grass interspersed with areas of gidgee, coolibah and boree woodlands. The area is very flat interrupted only by Mount Booka Booka and its surrounding hills. Oondooroo station once bordered Elderslie.

Elderslie Station lies at the eastern rim of a roughly circular zone measuring some 130 km across that has been identified by Geoscience Australia as a crustal anomaly. Proof is currently lacking as to the cause, but it is believed likely that the anomaly was caused by an asteroid strike that happened about 300 million years ago.

== History ==
John McKinlay and his party would have trekked through the area in 1862, while searching for the Burke and Wills expedition, following the banks to the Diamantina to where it met Middleton Creek en route to the Gulf of Carpentaria. This point later became the boundary of the Elderslie. William Landsborough also passed through in 1866 and described the land as well grassed in season but stocking it could be difficult through lack of surface water.

In 1873, William Forsayth took up three blocks fronting the Diamantina and Western Rivers covering some 3,108 km^{2} (1,200 sq mi) and named the run Doveridge. The first sheep arrived at the property in mid-1874 and then later the same year Forsayth transferred the lease to Donald Wallace, a Victorian pastoralist, who began to acquire surrounding blocks until the area was 4,662 km^{2} (1,800 sq mi), encompassing the land where Winton is located all the way to Middleton Creek. By 1879, Wallace owned the property outright, and by 1881, a stone homestead was constructed along with several outbuildings.

Sir Samuel Wilson bought the property some time prior to 1878. By 1887, the property was advertised as occupying an area of 2,450 sq mi (6,345 km^{2}) and held 40,000 sheep, 13,000 cattle, and 250 horses. The adjoining properties included Warrnambool Downs, Vindex, Ayrshire Downs, and Dagworth Stations. At the time, the lease had 40 mi (64 km) of double frontage to the Western River and over 30 mi (48 km) of double frontage to Middleton Creek with 350 mi (563 km) of fencing having been installed. In 1891, the property had 70,000 sheep and 20,000 head of cattle depastured, and was still owned by Samuel Wilson. The woolshed burnt down later the same year.

Banjo Paterson was thought to have worked at Elderslie as a jackeroo or storekeeper in 1895, at about the time he wrote "Waltzing Matilda", while visiting nearby Dagworth Station.

The property was sold in 1896 by the executors of Wilson's estate to the Ramsay brothers.

An engineer named Douglas Hutchinson drowned when he tried to cross the Diamantina River in 1901.

In 1912, the size of the station was 1,500 sq mi (3,885 km^{2}), and held a flock of about 112,000 sheep. The property was sold by the then owners, the Ramsay brothers, for £110,000. It had been acquired by Mr. C. J. Brabazon, who had recently sold Warenda Station and began improving his new run by employing about 100 men to work on fencing and other projects.

The first commercial flight in the Northern Territory by Qantas carried Mr. C. J. Brabazon from Elderslie to Austral Downs, another property he owned, in 1921.

The property was sold in 1924 by the Queensland Stock and Breeders Company to a Southern company, Australian Estates and Mortgage Company, that already had large interests in Queensland. The sale included the 80,000 sheep with which the property was stocked, along with all plant and equipment. At this time the station occupied an area of 680 square miles (1,761 km^{2}).

By 1933, the size of the property was 427 km^{2} (165 sq mi) and it was staffed by about 36 people.

Heavy rains inundated the area in 1940, causing extensive flooding further down the Diamantina.

In 1950, the property was sold by the Australian Estates and Mortgage Company and was then divided into seven separate grazing properties which were opened up for selection by the ballot process. The Elderslie leasehold was reduced to a size of 208.5 km^{2} (81 sq mi) and purchased by John Dixon, who sold again in 1954 to Keith Watts for five shillings per acre. Watts started to carry out repairs on the homestead which were later classified by the National Trust. A drover drowned while trying to ford the swollen Workingham Creek in 1955. During the 1980s, the roof of the manager's house was damaged during storms, resulting in the deterioration of the building.

In October 1992, the Elderslie Homestead was listed on the Queensland Heritage Register.

The property was still owned by the Watts family in 2011 and was stocked with a flock of 5300 sheep and 800 cattle.

== See also ==
- List of ranches and stations
