= Diamantina Lakes Station =

Former pastoral lease in central west Queensland, now Diamantina National Park

Coordinates: 23.76401°S 141.14119°E

Location in Queensland

Diamantina Lakes Station, most commonly known as Diamantina Lakes, was a pastoral lease that once operated as a cattle station in central west Queensland, and is now Diamantina National Park, a national park.

Diamantina Lakes station was located about 157 kilometres (98 mi) south east of Boulia and 239 kilometres (149 mi) north west of Windorah in the Channel Country of Queensland. The area is a mix of landscapes including sand dunes, claypans, sandstone mesas, gibber plains and river channels. The Diamantina River traverses the area meaning the plains are able to support extensive grasslands and have near-permanent naturally deep waterholes, fed by seasonal rains and the Great Artesian Basin.

The traditional owners of the area are the Maiawali and Karuwali peoples, who were well supported by the watercourses, ranges and plains in the area, and maintain a close spiritual connection with it.

== History ==
The station was established in 1876 with a partnership between John Arthur Macartney and Hugh Louis Heber-Percy, who initially took up the lease. Heber-Percy stayed on at the property as a manager for many years. By 1881 the property had been put for auction by Macartney, Mayne and Percy and was stocked with 5,000 cattle. The station occupied an area of 1,000 square miles (2,590 km^{2}) of open rolling downs and had double frontage on 42 miles (68 km) of the Diamantina River as well as some frontage to Mayne River and Spring Creek.

Sidney Kidman acquired the property in 1908, paying A£25,000 for the station and all its stock. The property occupied an area of 2,132 square miles (5,522 km^{2}) at the time and was purchased along with nearby Mount Poole Station and at the same time as the huge Innamincka Station in South Australia; Kidman sold off Victoria Downs in the Northern Territory and Carlton Hill Station in Western Australia to finance the deal.

Between 1914 and 1916 the area was struck by drought; about 10,000 cattle died on the station during this time. Kidman lost over 75,000 head of stock on all of his properties through the channel country, including Glengyle, Durham Downs, Innamincka and Sandringham Stations. Suffering financially, Kidman sold the property in 1918.

George Hooper and E. A. Trenenny formed a partnership and acquired the station, then later sold it to the Queensland Government. The two later purchased Davenport Downs Station but had to relinquish it for financial reasons.

In 1927 the government owned the station and sold it unstocked to a company that was still in the process of being formed, for the reserve price of A£10,000.

The Queensland Government purchased the property in 1992 and subsequently gazetted the 5,070-square-kilometre (1,958 sq mi) property, capable of holding up to 12,000 head of cattle, as the Diamantina National Park. A number of stock routes still exist, and are regularly used in the park.

== See also ==
- List of ranches and stations
- List of the largest stations in Australia
