= Innamincka Station =

Pastoral lease in South Australia

Coordinates: 27.724291°S 140.763184°E

Location in South Australia

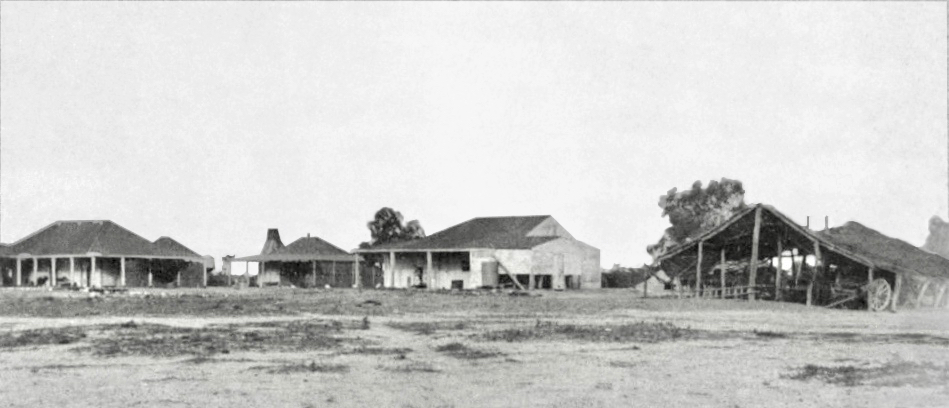
Innamincka Station in 1910

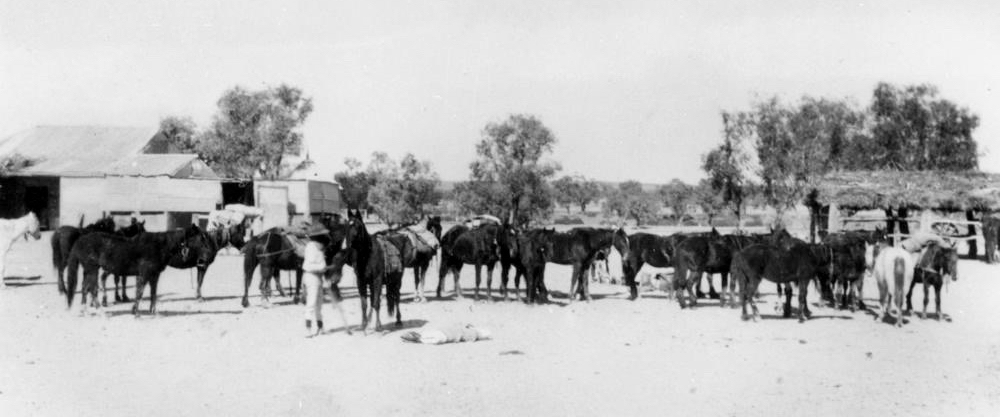
Horses at Innamincka Station in 1927

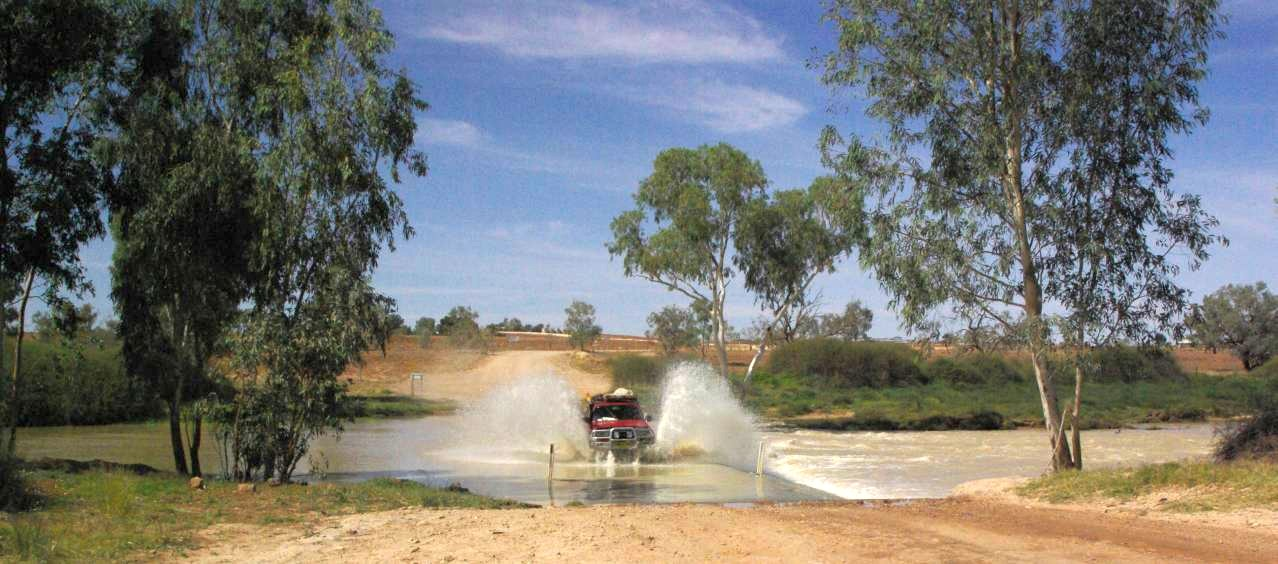
The Cooper Creek ford at Innamincka township

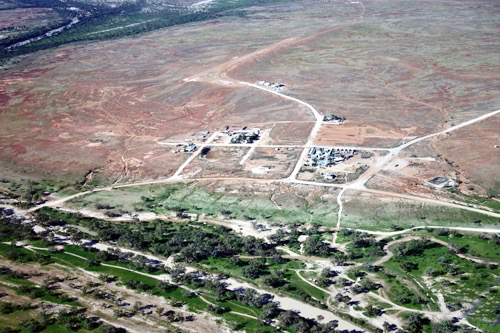
Innamincka township; the cattle station homestead is on the far bank of Cooper Creek, in the top left

Innamincka Station, often called simply Innamincka, is a pastoral lease in the Australian state of South Australia. It operates as a cattle station. It is located about 4 kilometres (2 miles) north-east of the small township of the same name. 23 km (14 mi) west of the Queensland border, and 246 km (153 mi) south-east of Birdsville. As of 2012 the station – the second largest in South Australia after Anna Creek station – occupied an area of 13,552 square kilometres (5,232 square miles) and was owned by the pastoral company, S. Kidman & Co.

The name of the station derives from two Aboriginal words meaning your shelter and your home.

== History ==
Innamincka Station was established in 1872 by Robert Bostock as the first station and permanent settlement along Cooper Creek. The station expanded until it covered more than 15,000 square kilometres (5,800 sq mi). In 1881, when the station and stock were sold to William Campbell for £60,000, it supported a herd of 8,000 cattle.

A man who became an Australian cattle baron, Sidney Kidman, bought Innamincka in 1908 from the trustees of the estate of William Campbell, when the station covered more than 4,000 square miles (10,360 km^{2}). He immediately sold 250 bullocks in the Adelaide yards, which were much admired for their "breeding and quality". Suffering financially after bad drought, Kidman sold the property in 1918; he later repurchased it.

In 1954, it covered an area of 9,175 square miles (24,000 km^{2}).

In 1981, it covered an area of 6,180 square miles (16,000 km^{2}).

In the late 1950s and the 1960s, the Australian energy company, Santos Limited, conducted a drilling program for oil and natural gas in the Cooper Basin, including at localities near Innamincka; the first commercial gas was discovered in 1963. Eventually 145 gas fields and 76 oil fields came into production, feeding into production facilities at Moomba, 70 kilometres (43 miles) to the south-west.

Floods and drought are characteristics of Australian outback localities. Those that affected Innamincka included the following:

- The Cooper Creek inundated the station in 1891.
- The locality was struck by a severe drought in 1902.
- The homestead was washed away during the floods of 1906.
- Between 1914 and 1916 the area was struck by drought, killing about 10,000 cattle at Innamincka. (Note: Kidman also lost 65,000 more on his other properties through the channel country, including Diamantina Lakes, Durham Downs, Glengyle and Sandringham Stations.)
- During floods in 1939, water levels came within 10 feet (3 m) of the 1906 mark.
- The entire area was struck by drought in 1946, causing many cattle deaths and destocking of properties.
- The area suffered severe flooding in March 1949 when it was hit with record rainfall. More than 21 inches (533 mm) of rain fell in four weeks – as much as would normally fall in four years. The area was described as a "vast inland sea", with Cooper Creek running at more than 15 miles (24 km) wide.

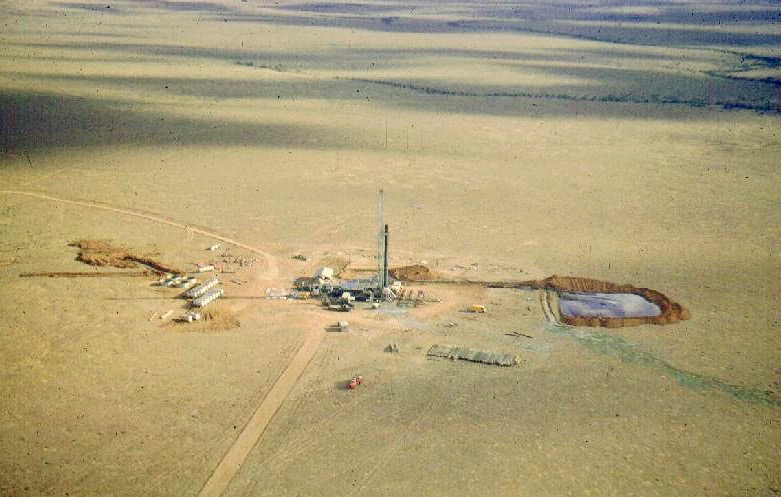
Santos drill rig near Innamincka in 1959

- In 1953 the property only received 2 inches (51 mm) of rain and only 1.5 inches (38 mm) in 1954.

The station had an excellent season in 1981; the country was reported as having "masses of yellow and white wildflowers".

== See also ==
- List of ranches and stations
- List of the largest stations in Australia
