= Austral Downs =

Pastoral lease in the Northern Territory

Coordinates: 20.502°S 137.774°E

Location in Northern Territory

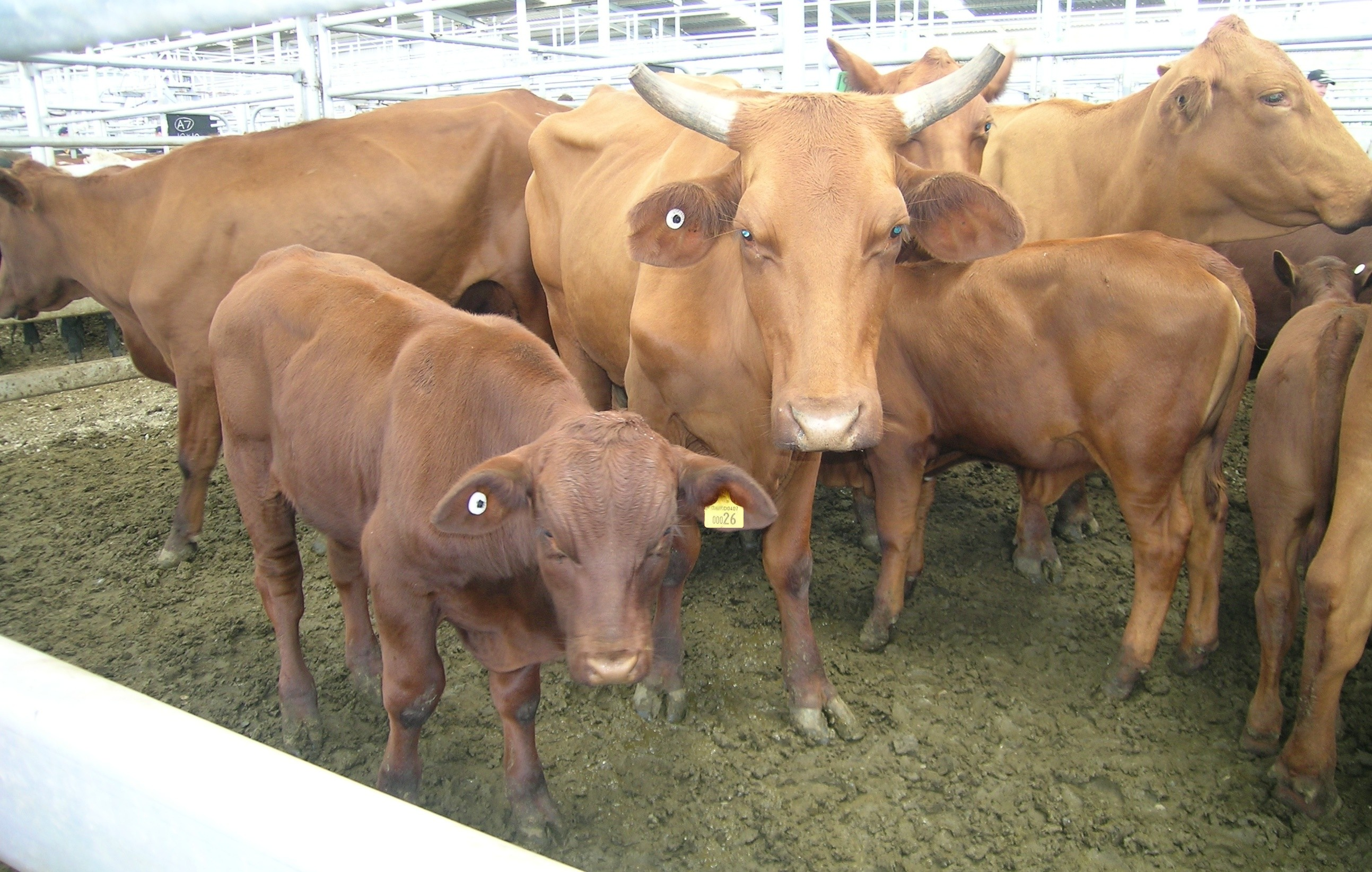
Santa Gertrudis cows and calves

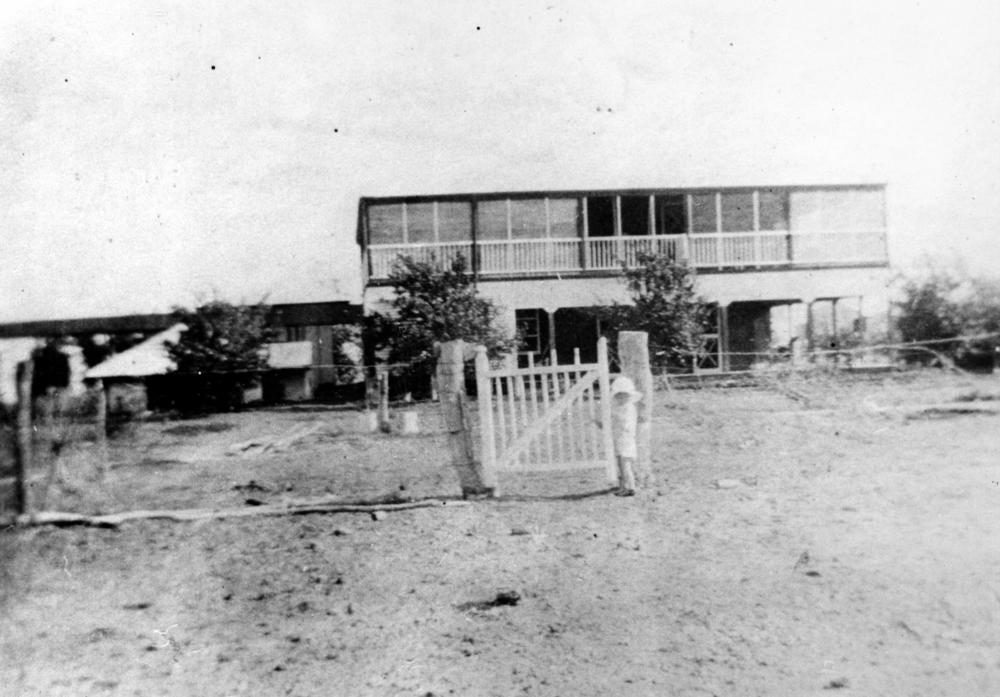
Austral Downs Homestead ca. 1930

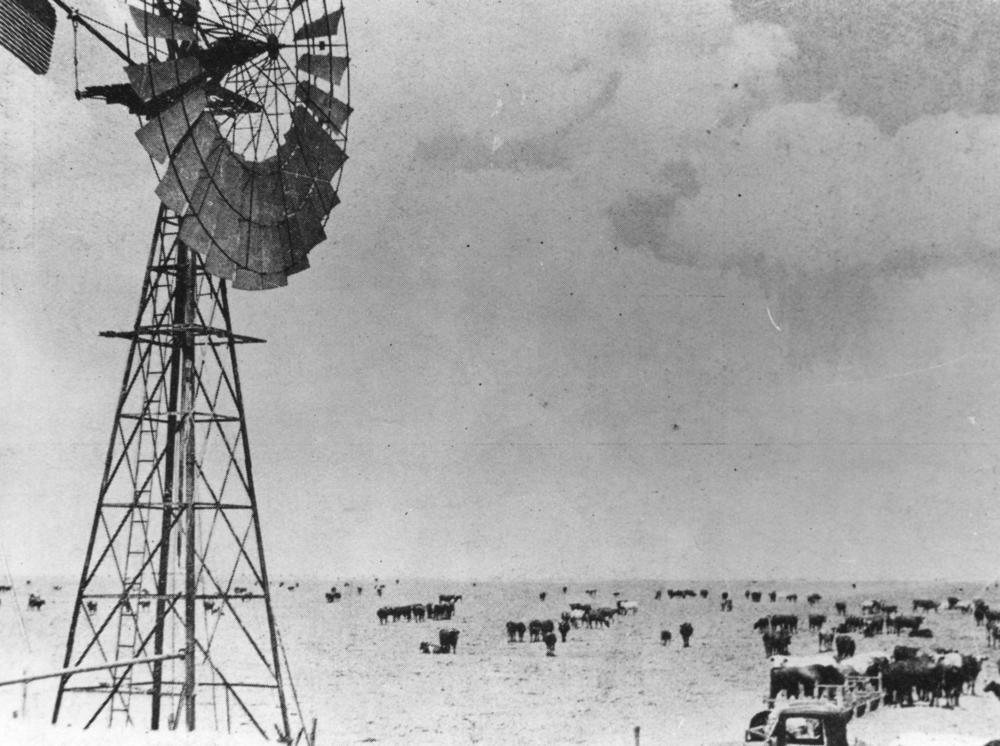
Cattle on Avon Downs Station 1939

Austral Downs Station, most commonly known as Austral Downs, is a cattle station on the Barkly Tableland in the Northern Territory, Australia. It is situated approximately 70 kilometres (43 mi) west of Camooweal and 250 kilometres (155 mi) north west of Mount Isa.

== Description ==
The Station occupies an area of 4,692 square kilometres (1,812 sq mi) and has a carrying capacity of approximately 42,000 head of Santa Gertrudis crossed with Angus crossed with Wagyu cattle. The station is run by the Australian Agricultural Company in combination with Avon Downs with an area of 3,939 square kilometres (1,521 sq mi); together the properties turn off an average of 25,000 head per year.

The soil is described as being black to brown loam with a good deal of limestone. The rolling downs are covered in Mitchell grass amongst areas of Gidyea woodlands. The property is situated along the Herbert River and Happy Creek, both of which are tributaries of the Georgina River.

== History ==
The station was established in 1883 when Richardson, Little and Carr took up a large area of land known as Austral Downs on the tableland. Initially the property was to be stocked with sheep. By mid-1884 the property was stocked with 1,400 head of cattle and 140 horses. A flock of 8,200 ewes were overlanded to the property later the same year.

Some flooding occurred in 1885 following heavy rains, with Austral losing £1000 worth of earthworks. The entire area was affected by far more severe flooding in 1901, with the station reported as having been entirely swept away by the combined flood waters of the Georgina, Rankin and James Rivers.

Brabazon and Co. bought the property in 1911. At this time the station had an estimated area of 794 square miles (2,056 km^{2}) and was sold unstocked. The first commercial flight in the Northern Territory by Qantas carried Mr. C. J. Brabazon from Elderslie Station to Austral Downs in 1921.

In 1925 the station was acquired by the Scottish Australian Land Company. Later the same year the property was placed under quarantine following an outbreak of redwater in the herd.

Floods occurred in early 1927 with the crossing to the station being submerged under 6 feet (1.8 m) of water, cutting the telegraph line.

The area was gripped by drought from 1934 to mid-1935 before the property received 1.1 inches (28 mm) of rain in one day.

The drought of 1952 lead to Austral and other stations trying to move all stock from their properties and trucking them to the Mount Isa railhead to move further afield for agistment.

Later in the 1950s a rocket shelter was constructed at Austral as part of the Woomera space program.

In 1980 the property was sold to Nelson Bunker Hunt, an American billionaire, along with other parts of the Scottish Australian Company assets. The Australian Agricultural Company acquired Austral in 1990 to be run in conjunction with neighbouring Avon Downs which the company had purchased in 1921.

== See also ==
- List of ranches and stations
- List of the largest stations in Australia
