= Dagworth Station =

Cattle station in Queensland, Australia

Coordinates: 21°52′0″S 142°09′0″E

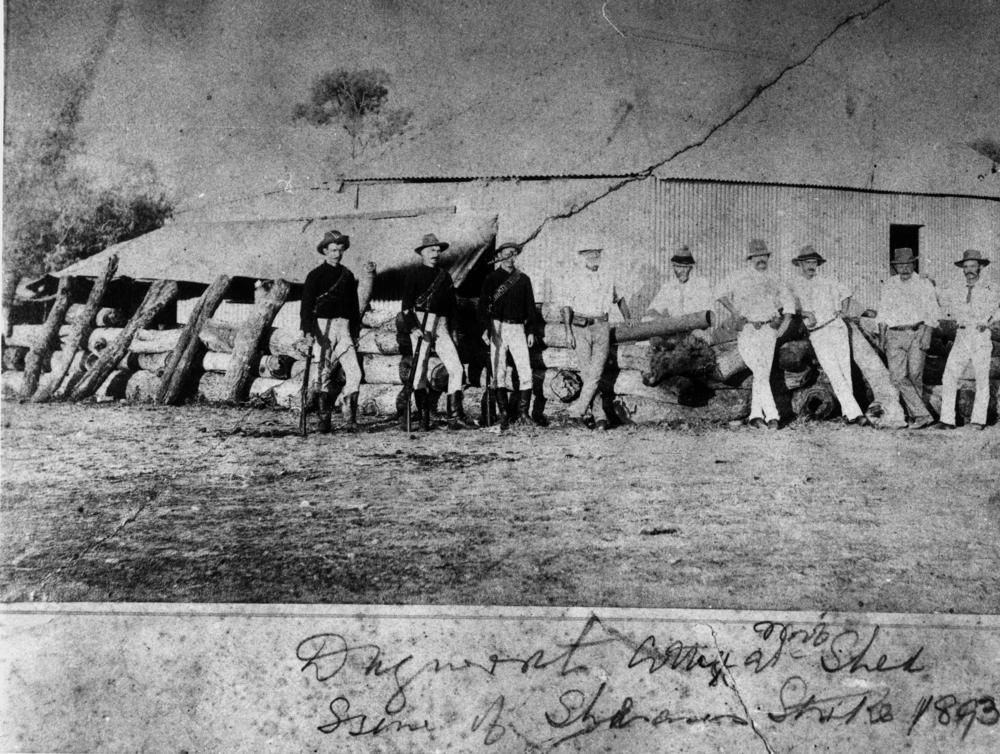
Troopers at Dagworth Station during the shearer's strike in 1894

Dagworth Station is a cattle station located north-west of Winton in central west Queensland in Australia. It was established in 1876 by Messrs Hunter and Urquhart who were living in a grass hut on the property in 1878 when they were still building up the run. One of the adjoining properties in 1887 was Elderslie Station, which at the time was owned by Sir Samuel Wilson.

== History ==
In 1894 the station's shearing shed was burned down along with seven others in the district as part of a protest by shearers over wages. The Macpherson family owned the station in the 1890s and early 1900s. Samuel Hoffmeister, who was implicated in these events was later found dead at a nearby billabong. The following year Banjo Paterson visited the station and wrote the lyrics to "Waltzing Matilda", said to be inspired by these incidents. The music for the song was arranged by Christina Macpherson, the daughter of the owner of Dagworth and sister of the manager of the property Robert Macpherson.

The station was bought by the North Australian Pastoral Company in 1995.

In March 2015, Geoscience Australia reported that the Diamantina River’s course at and near its headwaters flows along the edge of a roughly circular crustal anomaly that might well be an impact structure. It is 130 km in diameter, and Dagworth lies in its northeast quadrant. The asteroid impact, if indeed this is the explanation for the anomaly, would have happened roughly 300 million years ago.

== See also ==
- List of ranches and stations
