= Diamantina River ring feature =

The Diamantina River ring feature is a geomorphic feature that consists of a conspicuous near-360° circular drainage pattern that forms the headwaters of the Diamantina River. It is centred near the Woodstock Station west of Winton, Channel Country, Central West Queensland. This geomorphic feature coincides with a potassium–thorium–uranium radiometric signature that is associated with exposed clay-rich sedimentary rocks of the Cretaceous Winton Formation, high-uranium elevated Cenozoic duricrust surfaces, and high-thorium elevated sediment eroded from the Cenozoic weathering profile. The Diamantina River ring feature is one of several circular crustal structures of diverse origin that have been mapped within Australia. These circular crustal structures include geologic structures such as tectonic domes, circular granite intrusions, volcanic calderas and ring structures, salt domes, impact structures and morphological drainage rings of unknown origin.

Beneath the Diamantina River ring feature, two seismic reflection sections exhibit a circa 100 kilometres (62 mi)-wide zone of anomalously moderately reflective to weakly reflective crust underlying flat–lying, undisturbed sedimentary strata. These sedimentary strata consist of the superimposed sedimentary basin fills of Jurassic–Cretaceous Eromanga and Permian–Triassic Galilee basins. The anomalous crust overlies a well-defined circa 39 to 45 kilometres (24 to 28 mi)-deep Mohorovičić discontinuity. This region of seismically non-reflective to weakly reflective crust separates crust of different seismic reflection character on either side. As discussed below, the nature of the seismic non-reflective crust is unknown.

== Name ==
This geomorphic feature has been given numerous names. In his discussions of its origin, Glikson refers to it in nongeneric terms as the Diamantina River ring feature. In reference to theories proposing it to be of extraterrestrial impact origin, Kennett refers to it as the Winton crater and Donchak calls it the Winton Impact Structure. In a press release, Geoscience Australia, refers to the Woodstock-Winton circular drainage ring in a map caption in reference to the Diamantina River's course.

== Impact hypothesis ==
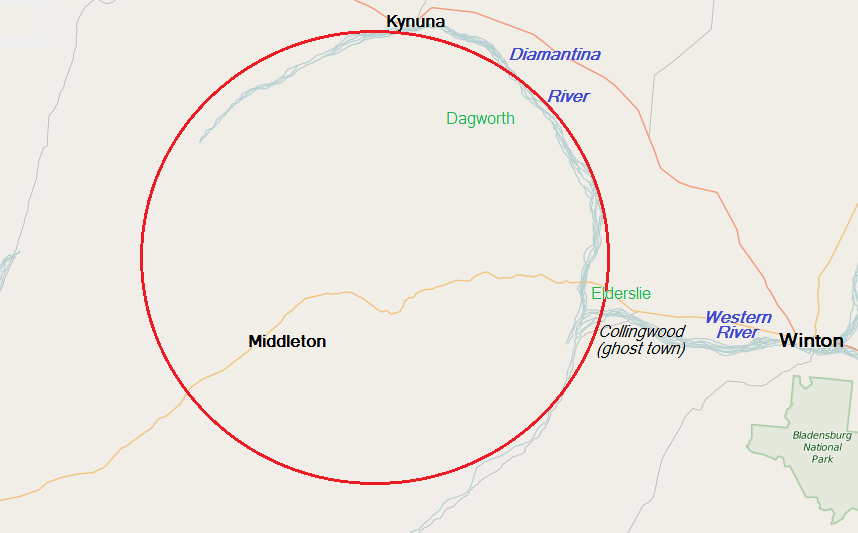
A map showing the rough extent of the crustal anomaly west of Winton that may be a Palaeozoic impact structure.

Scientists from Geoscience Australia have proposed that this feature is associated with an impact event that happened about 300 million years ago. The region in which the asteroid impact theoretically happened lies in a sparsely populated area in the Australian Outback centred roughly at 22.15°S 141.9°E. This region is roughly circular with a diameter of about 120 kilometres (75 mi) and thus has an area of about 11,300 square kilometres (4,400 sq mi)). The depopulated town of Middleton and Dagworth Station – famous for the part it played in the creation of "Waltzing Matilda" – lie within the anomaly discovered here. Skirting the edge of this region for more than half its circumference, mostly on the north and east sides, round from its headwaters to well below its confluence with the Western River, is the Diamantina River, an intermittent stream with, in most places, several braided channels of the kind that give the Channel Country its name.

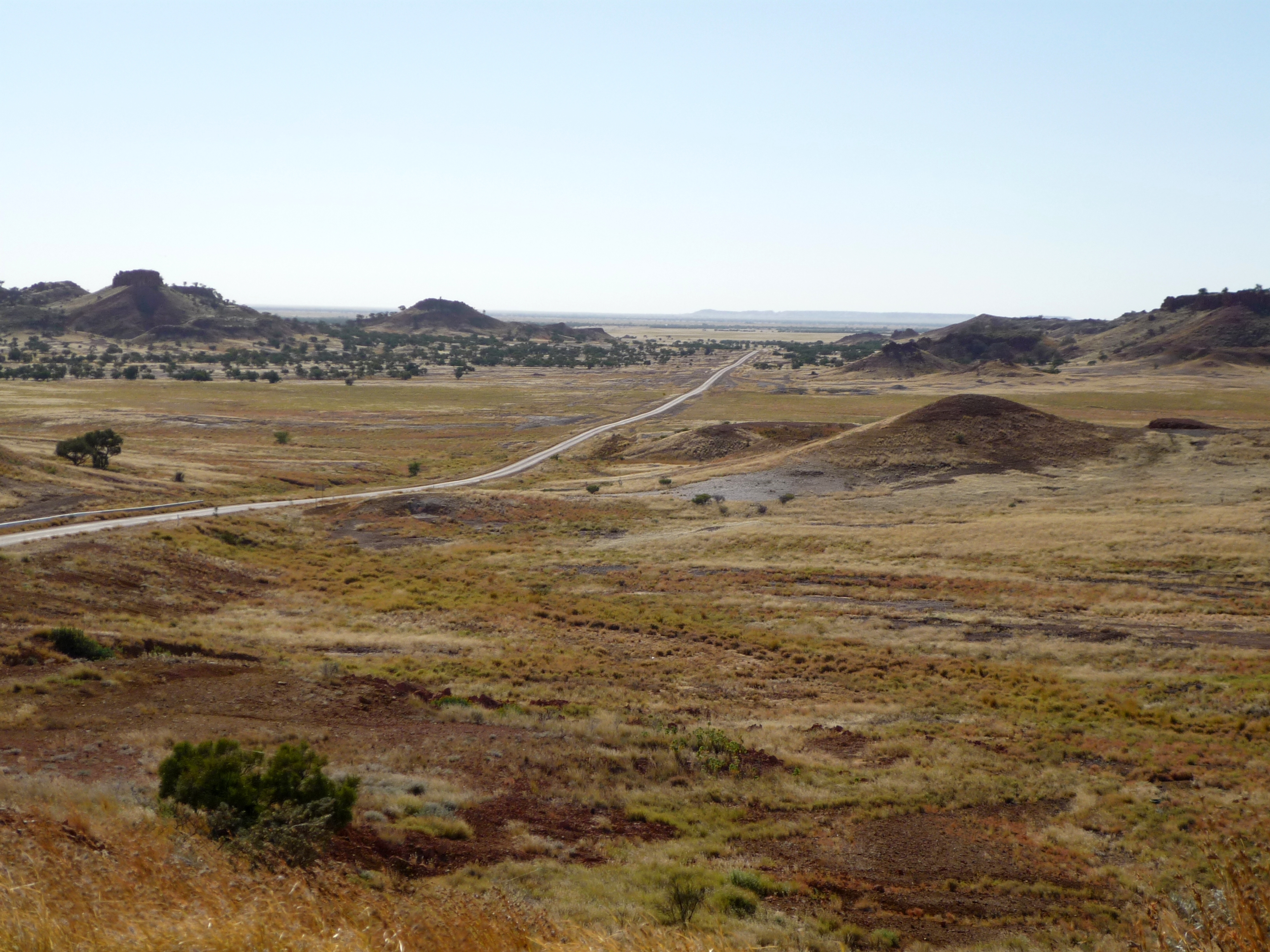
The countryside within the Diamantina River ring feature, here looking roughly north from Cornpore Lookout near Middleton. The road is the Kennedy Developmental Road.

The Diamantina River's hook-shaped upper reaches had long been a puzzle to science. To Andrew Glikson, whose research interests include "early crustal evolution with focus on the role of asteroid impacts", the near-circular course was the first indication that there might be an anomaly in the crust in this region. Glikson's research into the matter revealed several noteworthy things about this circular area. For instance, the circular area inside the upper Diamantina lies within a "magnetically quiet zone", according to data yielded by studies of the local magnetic fields, whereas the neighbouring rock shows a more linear pattern in its magnetic signatures. Reflection seismology, used on a line transecting the area's outer rim, also revealed "dramatic" differences between the rock within the anomaly and outside it. It can thus be inferred that the possible cause is a disturbance of the deep crust by something like a great impact. Gravimetry revealed some interesting information about the anomaly's centre, which itself contains a gravimetric anomaly. This told the researchers about differences in rock densities as compared to neighbouring areas of crust, likewise suggesting that there could long ago have been a major impact event.

Proof is the one thing currently wanting in any quest to label the Diamantina River ring feature an asteroid impact structure. However, the scientists involved see that as rather a straightforward matter of drilling core samples in the zone and then analyzing them. Richard Blewett from Geoscience Australia quoted the needed depth for these samples as "about three kilometres", whereas Geoscience Australia says in its own report, somewhat more conservatively, that the depth will have to be "many hundreds of metres". Analysis of the core samples would involve, among other things, the detection of "shock textures" in the rock, caused by the great energy of an asteroid impact. The impact event is, as of this writing, only theoretical. Its reality is far from certain. Richard Blewett, mentioned above, admits that there are other possible explanations for the geological anomaly on the upper Diamantina, but adds "but they become difficult to explain".

== See also ==
- List of possible impact structures on Earth
- Lawn Hill crater
- Tookoonooka crater
