= Diamantina River =

Diamantina
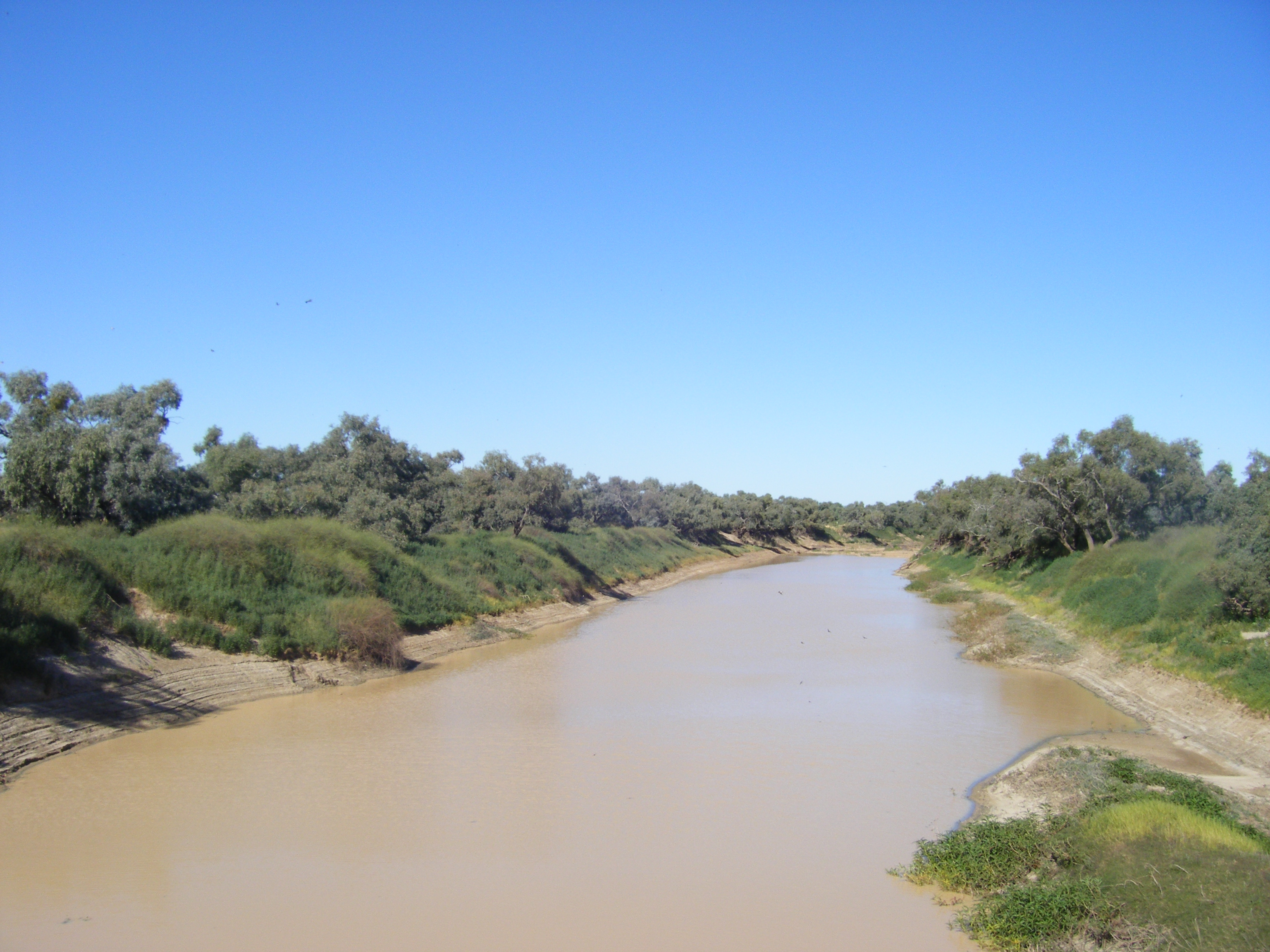
- The Diamantina River at Birdsville, Queensland

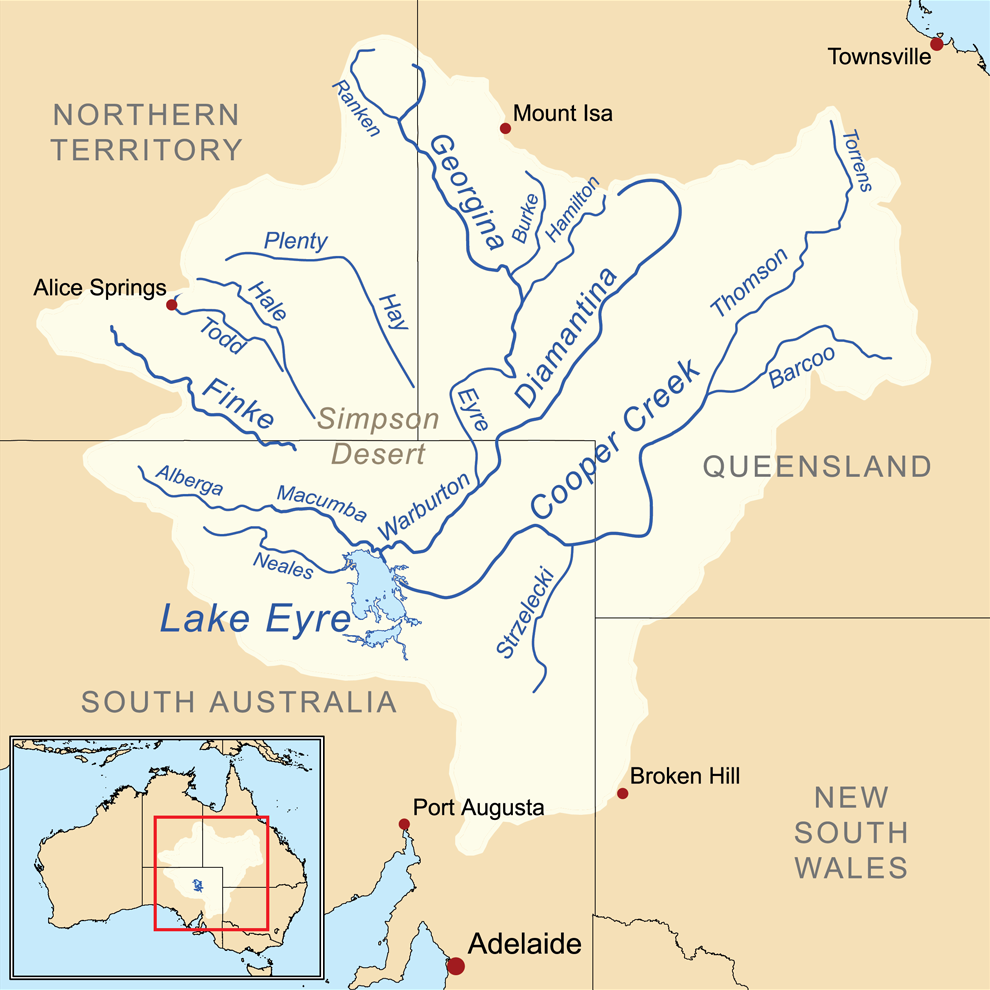
- Map of the Lake Eyre Basin showing the Diamantina River
- Etymology: Lady Diamantina Bowen

Location
- Country: Australia
- State: Queensland, South Australia
- Region: Channel Country

Physical characteristics
- Source: Swords Range
  - location: west of Winton, South West, Queensland
  - elevation: 313 m (1,027 ft)
- Mouth: Warburton River
  - location: confluence with the Eyre Creek, Far North, South Australia
  - elevation: 20 m (66 ft)
- Length: 900 km (560 mi)
- Basin size: 157,000 km^{2} (61,000 sq mi)

Basin features
- River system: Lake Eyre basin
- Tributaries
  - left: Western River, Mayne River
- National park: Diamantina National Park

The Diamantina River is a major river in Central West Queensland and the far north of South Australia.

The river was named by William Landsborough in 1866 for Lady Diamantina Bowen (née Roma), wife of Sir George Bowen, the first Governor of Queensland. It has three major tributaries the Western River, Mayne River and Farrars Creek.

== Geography ==
Rising north-west of Longreach in the Swords Range in Queensland, the river flows in a south-westerly direction through central Queensland and the Channel Country to form the Warburton River at its confluence with the Georgina River. In extremely wet years, the Warburton River flows as far as Lake Eyre. The length of the Diamantina River is approximately 900 km (560 mi), and the basin is approximately 157,000 square kilometres (61,000 sq mi), of which 140,000 square kilometres (54,000 sq mi) are used for agriculture.

Most of the basin of the Diamantina is very flat—even the highest points in the northeast do not reach 500 m (1,600 ft) above sea level and Lake Eyre itself is 16 m (52 ft) below sea level. Apart from a few streams near Winton (the largest town in the basin) almost all rivers in the basin flow southwestwards towards Birdsville. The Diamantina River has no main channel, rather it is a series of wide and relatively shallow channels. The major feature of the river's sluggish course is Diamantina National Park about halfway between Winton and Birdsville. Apart from the national park, almost all land in the basin is used for grazing cattle and sheep, though numbers fluctuate greatly and considerable skill is required on the part of graziers.

The variable drought and flood cycles of the area make the river ephemeral with many semi-permanent waterholes. The highest recorded flow rate of the river was at Birdsville in 1974 with 4,700 cubic metres per second (170,000 cu ft/s) was measured.

The Diamantina runs along the northern and eastern rim of a roughly circular zone measuring some 130 km across that has been identified by Geoscience Australia as a crustal anomaly. Proof is currently lacking as to the cause, but it is believed likely that the anomaly was caused by an asteroid strike that happened about 300 million years ago.

== Environment ==
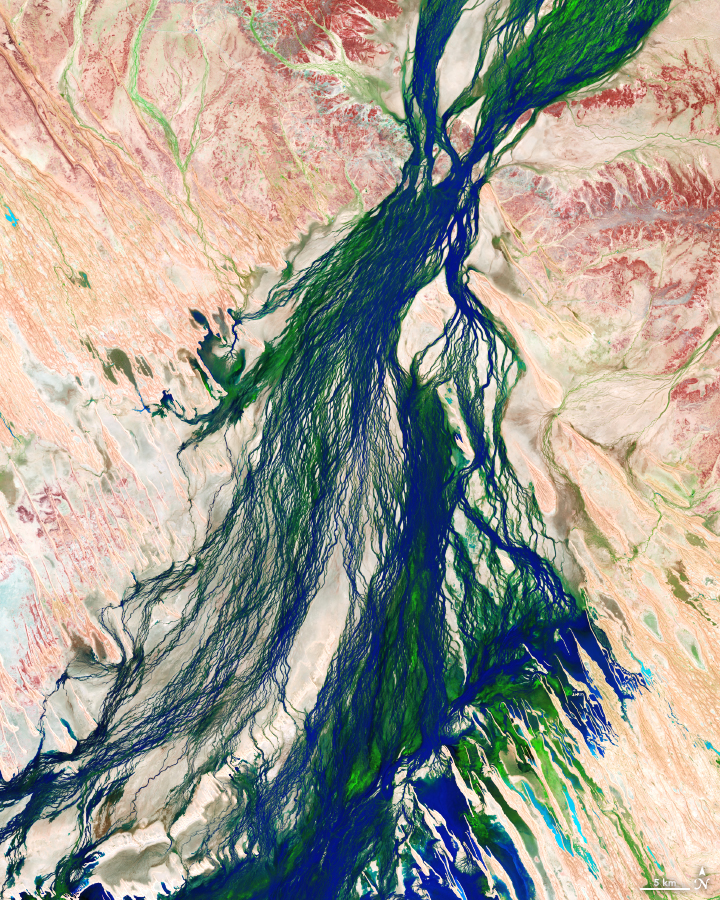
The Diamantina River in Australia during the spring floods, 2023. Landsat data from the U.S. Geological Survey. False-color image: see text at image file for explanation.

=== Climate ===
The climate of the basin is hot and arid. In January, temperatures throughout the basin average around 37 °C (99 °F) during the day and decline only to about 24 °C (75 °F) at night. In winter, they typically range from 25 °C (77 °F) during the day to 11 °C (52 °F) at night. On occasions, however, frost has been reported in all areas of the basin: Winton has recorded minima as low as −1.8 °C (28.8 °F).

==== Precipitation ====
Rainfall is heavily concentrated between December and March: averages for these four months range from 310 mm (12 in) at Winton and Kynuna to around 90 mm (3.5 in) at Birdsville. In the rest of the year rainfall is very scanty and only on the rarest occasions are significant falls reported: throughout most of the basin the average rainfall between May and September totals around 40 mm (1.6 in). However, the rainfall of the basin, as with all of the Lake Eyre Basin, is exceedingly erratic and catastrophic droughts and floods tend to be the normal state of affairs throughout this region. In the northern part of the basin, annual rainfalls as high as 1,100 mm (43 in) were reported in 1894, 1950, 1974 and 2000, whilst even in Birdsville annual totals as high as 550 mm (22 in) have been reported. During floods the river can be as wide as 30 km (19 mi) across.

In dry years such as 1902, 1905, 1928, 1961, 1965 and 2002, almost the whole basin reported totals 100 mm (3.9 in). There can also be significant variation from station to station over small areas: although the annual averages and variability at Winton and Kynuna are almost alike, the actual totals at the two stations can differ by as much as 200 mm (7.9 in) in some years due to isolated very heavy rainfalls.

=== Soils ===
The soils in the region are mainly grey and brown vertisols, with some fluvents in the drier areas. Although they do not have high phosphate contents, they have adequate levels of most other nutrients: consequently when rainfall is abundant the grasses within the basin are extremely nutritious, especially in the lower reaches of the river around Birdsville, which is a primary region for cattle fattening in years when rainfall further north is adequate to flood the region.

=== Wildlife ===
The 3,400-square-kilometre (1,300 sq mi) floodplain of the lower reaches of the Diamantina has been identified as an Important Bird Area by BirdLife International because it has been estimated to support at least 450,000 waterbirds when in flood, as well as globally significant numbers of the nankeen night-heron, royal spoonbill, little curlew, Australian bustard, grey grasswren, inland dotterel, cinnamon quail-thrush and pied honeyeater.

== History ==
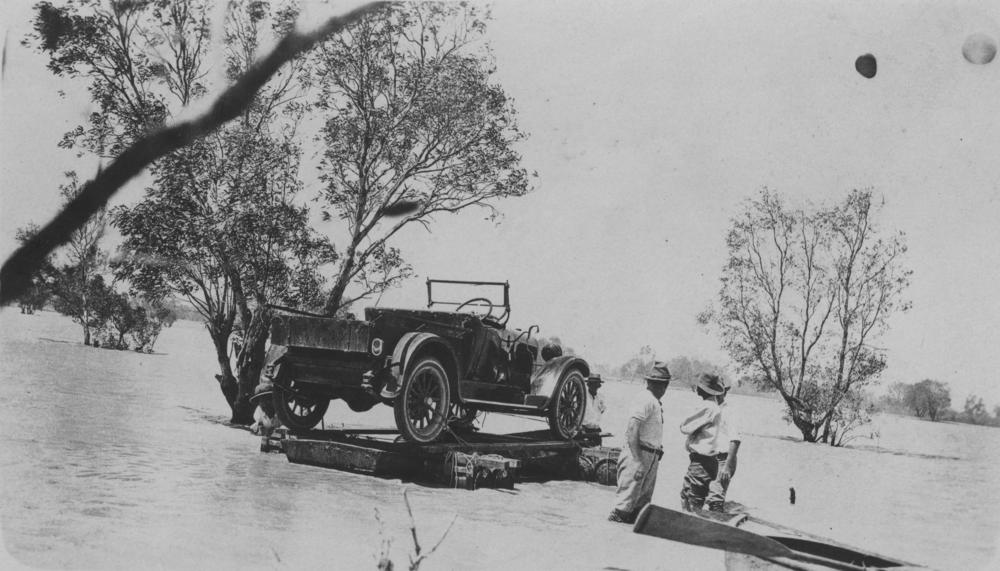
Crossing the Diamantina River in flood at Birdsville, Queensland, 1924

The river is ephemeral but floods periodically following heavy rainfall events in the catchment. During the floods of 1940 the mailman, Harry Ding, completed his round using a motorboat and Cooper Creek was measured at around 43 kilometres (27 mi) wide. In 1950 flooding covered some 7,770 square kilometres (3,000 sq mi), with the river described as a raging torrent 48 kilometres (30 mi) wide.

In 1960, Ben Murray reported that in 1890 a massacre of about forty indigenous people took place at the Cooninghera Waterhole on the Diamantina River in South Australia. He said the killings were carried out by colonial stockmen and pastoralists, apparently in reprisal for the murder of a station cook who had allegedly raped an indigenous female.

Karuwali (also known as Garuwali, Dieri) is a language of far western Queensland. The Karuwali language region includes the landscape within the local government boundaries of the Diamantina Shire Council, including the localities of Betoota and Haddon Corner.

== See also ==
- List of rivers of Australia
- Diamantina River ring feature
