= Don Bradman (disambiguation) =

Don Bradman (1908–2001) was an Australian cricketer.

Don or Donald Bradman may also refer to:

- Don Bradman in popular culture
- Don Bradman with the Australian cricket team in England in 1948
- Don Bradman's batting technique
- Controversies involving Don Bradman
- List of international cricket centuries by Don Bradman

== Namesakes ==
- Don Bradman Cricket 14, a 2014 cricket video game
- Don Bradman Cricket 17, a 2016 cricket video game
- Sir Donald Bradman Drive, Adelaide, a major arterial road
- Sir Donald Bradman Oration, a cricket calendar event held in Australia
- "Our Don Bradman", a 1930 song by Jack O'Hagan

== See also ==
- Bradman (disambiguation)
- The Don (disambiguation)
