= 1894 Australian shearers' strike =

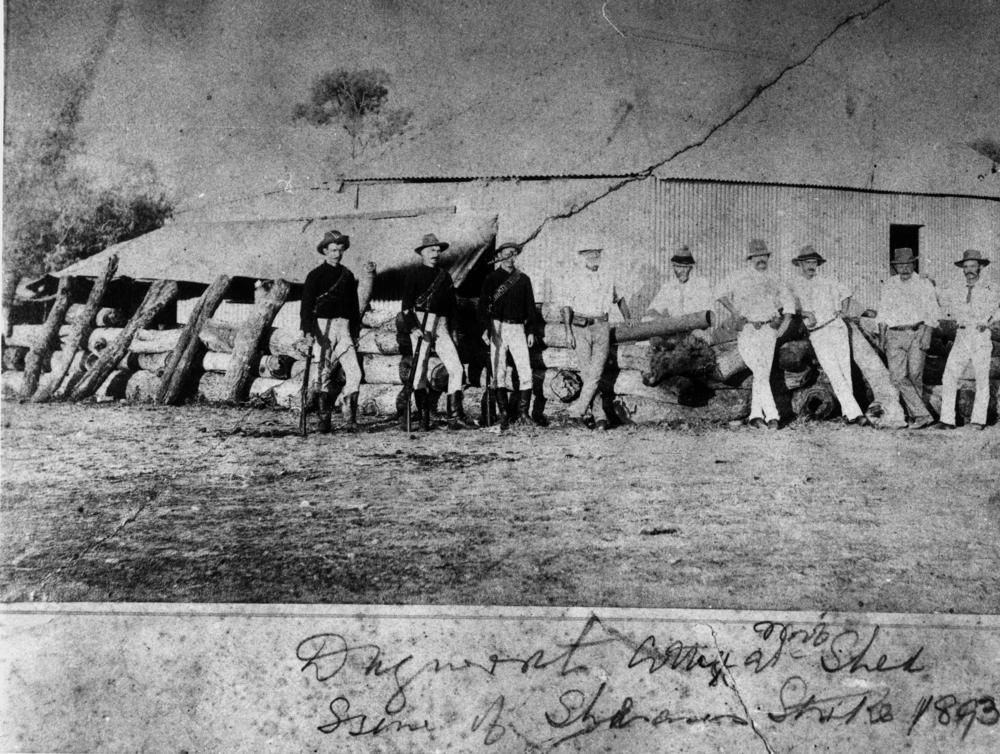
A fortified temporary shearing shed at Dagworth Station following the 1894 arson of the main shed. The three troopers at left are thought to be those referred to in Waltzing Matilda, while the squatter was Bob Macpherson, fourth from right

After the 1890 Australian maritime dispute and the 1891 Australian shearers' strike both of which were long, drawn out affairs in which trade unions were defeated, running out of funds, actions by increasingly militant and desperate unions led up to perhaps the most violent shearers' strike, in 1894.

Particularly due to falling wool prices in London, pastoralists were motivated to cut pay rates and hire non-union labour, which was plentiful due to mass unemployment during the 1890s depression. In May 1894, the Amalgamated Workers Union rose to the defence of the shearers' wages .

By October 1894 the Queensland Amalgamated Workers Union conceded defeat and called off the strike in the colony of Queensland. However, the strike continued in New South Wales, where possibly 16,000 workers gathered in strike camps. Police were mobilised against them.

The most famous incident during the strike was the burning and sinking of the steamer Rodney, which was transporting non-union labour up the Darling River. When the boat was moored in a swamp 23 miles (37 km) above Pooncarie, a few miles above the Moorara shearing shed, unionists boarded, took control, offloaded all passengers, then soaked the hold in kerosene and set it alight. The burning boat drifted away and sank after several hours.

In September 1894, on Dagworth Station, north-west of Winton), striking shearers fired their rifles and pistols in the air, setting fire to the woolshed. The owner of the homestead and three policemen gave chase to a man named Samuel Hoffmeister – also known as "French(y)". Rather than be captured, Hoffmeister shot and killed himself at the Combo Waterhole. It has been widely accepted that the lyrics of Waltzing Matilda are based the incident.
