= Don Bradman in popular culture =

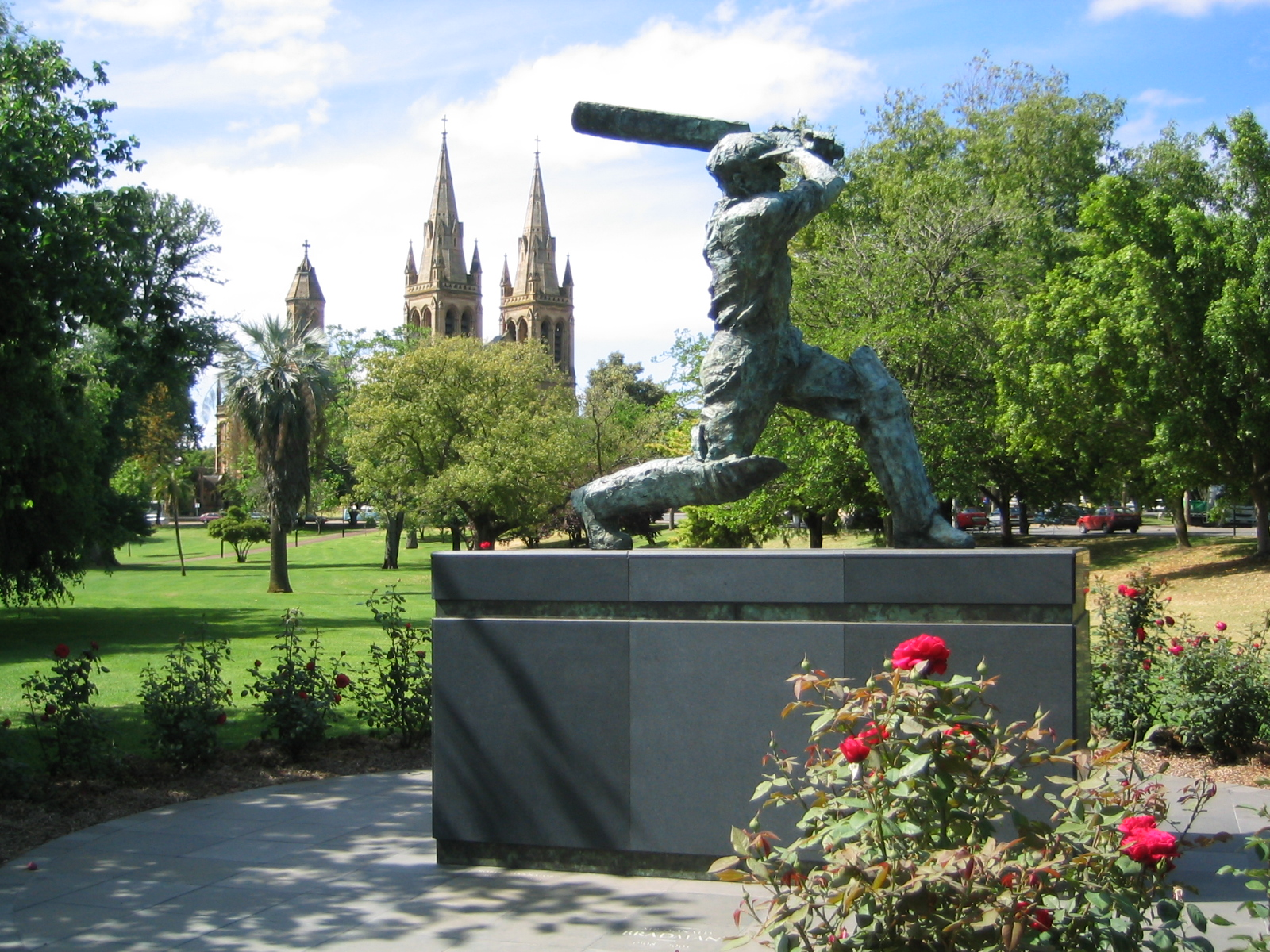
Don Bradman statue at the Adelaide Oval

The appearances of former Australian cricketer Don Bradman in popular culture are many and varied. As a player, he first came to prominence during the 1928/29 season. His record-breaking performances on the 1930 tour of England made him a national hero in Australia. Bradman was a private person who did not enjoy the adulation associated with his fame. In cricket, a batsman who enjoys an exceptional run of form over an extended period is sometimes called Bradmanesque.

Bradman's name has become a generic term for outstanding excellence, both within cricket and in the wider world.

== Coins and stamps ==
In 1997, Australia Post issued two stamps depicting Bradman, the first living Australian to be so featured. The issue was part of a series entitled "Australian Legends". Another stamp featuring Bradman was issued in March 2001, after his death.

In 2001, the platypus was replaced by an image of Bradman on the obverse side of the Australia's common 20-cent coin, the first such change since the decimalisation of Australian currency in 1966. The Commonwealth Treasury issued three limited edition legal-tender coins in 2001 as a posthumous tribute to Bradman's career.

== Film ==
The story of the Bodyline series was retold in the 1984 television miniseries Bodyline, in which Hugo Weaving played Douglas Jardine and Gary Sweet played Don Bradman.

Bradman appeared as himself in the 1936 film The Flying Doctor.

In 1996, journalist Ray Martin interviewed Bradman in a Channel 9 programme called Bradman: 87 Not Out, so named because Bradman was 87 at the time. It included his wife Lady Jessie Bradman and Sachin Tendulkar, and was later released on VHS.

== Landmarks ==
- The Bradman Stand at the Sydney Cricket Ground was dedicated in 1974.
- The Bradman Oval in Bowral was opened in 1976.
- The Bradman Stand at the Adelaide Oval was dedicated in 1990. It was subsequently demolished as part of a redevelopment before 2014. The section of the Western Stand containing the cricket changerooms was then renamed as the "Sir Donald Bradman Pavilion".
- The Bradman Gate in the Great Southern Stand at the Melbourne Cricket Ground was opened in 1992.
- Burbridge Road, a main thoroughfare in the city of Adelaide, was renamed Sir Donald Bradman Drive in 2001.

== Literature ==
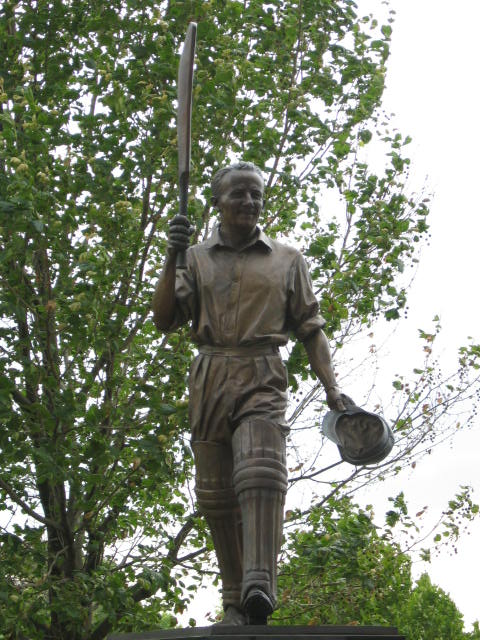
Statue of Bradman at the Melbourne Cricket Ground

Alan Eason stated that Bradman has been the subject of more biographies than any other Australian, apart from the outlaw Ned Kelly. Bradman authored four books himself:

- Don Bradman's Book: The Story of My Cricketing Life with Hints on Batting, Bowling and Fielding, published in 1930.
- My Cricketing Life in 1938.
- Farewell to Cricket in 1950.
- The Art of Cricket in 1958.

The following is a list of books that encompasses biographies, pictorial essays, artworks and anthologies that have been written about Bradman and his cricketing career:

- Bradman by AG Moyes, Harrap 1948.
- Bradman: An Australian Hero by Charles Williams, Little, Brown 1996.
- Bradman and the Bodyline Series by Ted Docker, Angus & Robertson (UK) 1978.
- Bradman the Great by BJ Wakley, Nicholas Kaye of London, 1959.
- Bradman: The Illustrated Biography by Michael Page, Macmillan 1983.
- Bradman Revisited – The Legacy of Sir Donald Bradman by AL Shillinglaw and Brian Hale, The Parrs Wood Press 2003.
- Bradman's Band by Ashley Mallett, UQP 2000.
- Bradman; What They Said About Him edited by Barry Morris, ABC Books 1995.
- Don Bradman by Philip Lindsay, Phoenix House 1951.
- Farewell to Bradman: A Final Tribute edited by Peter Allen, Pan Macmillan Australia 2001.
- Images of Bradman by Peter Allen and James Kemsley, Allen Kemsley Publishing 1994.
- Our Don Bradman edited by Philip Derriman, Macmillan Australia 1987.
- Remembering Bradman edited by Margaret Geddes, Penguin Group (Australia) 2002.
- Sir Donald Bradman: A Biography by Irving Rosenwater, Batsford 1978.
- The A–Z of Bradman by Alan Eason, ABC Books 2004.
- The Art of Bradman text by Richard Mulvaney, Artwork by Brian Clinton, Funtastic Ltd. 2003.
- The Bradman Albums drawn from the collection held by the State Library of South Australia, Rigby 1987.
- The Don: A Biography of Sir Donald Bradman by Roland Perry, Macmillan 1995.
- The Don – A Photographic Essay of a Legendary Life by Michael Page and Des Fregan, Sun-Macmillan 1988.
- The Private Don by Christine Wallace, Allen & Unwin 2004.
- Wisden on Bradman edited by Graeme Wright, Hardie Grant Books 1998.

== Museum ==
In 1987, the Bradman museum opened at the Bradman Oval in Bowral.

== Plants ==
The Sir Donald Bradman Rose, a hybrid tea rose bred by Meilland International, was released in June 2002.

== Sporting Awards ==
- The Sport Australia Hall of Fame Awards was inaugurated in 1985 with Bradman as its first inductee.

"The Don" award is made annually and was first awarded in 1998 to, "honour a current Australian athlete who, by their achievements and example over the last 12 months, are considered to have had the capacity to most inspire the nation." Award-winners do not receive immediate induction into the Hall of Fame, they become eligible for nomination after retirement, the same rule that applies to all athletes. So far, 12 winners have been named.

- The South Australian Cricket Association presents the Bradman Medal every season to the best player in Adelaide's Grade cricket competition.
- Cricket Australia presents the Bradman Young Cricketer of the Year award at the annual Allan Border Medal night.

== Songs ==
Bradman is immortalised in some popular songs of very different styles and eras.

- "Our Don Bradman", a jaunty ditty written by Jack O'Hagan and performed by Art Leonard, was recorded during 1930.
- "Bradman" written and performed by Paul Kelly, appeared on the CD release of Kelly's 1987 album Under the Sun.
- "The Tiger And The Don", written and performed by Ted Egan, released on the 1989 album This Land Australia and the 2003 album The Land Downunder.
- "Sir Don", a 1996 tribute written by John Williamson, who performed it at Bradman's Memorial Service.
- He was also featured in the famous 2007 "Eulogy Song" written by Chris Taylor of The Chaser, in which his bad temper and overall crankiness was outlined.
- Greg Champion wrote and recorded the comedic song "I Was A Mate of Don Bradman" for his the 2009 album Strayana.

== Other ==
In the Italian campaign of the Second World War, "Bradman will be batting tomorrow" were the code words used by allied forces to signal their attack on the Monte Cassino monastery.

A popular story is that Sir Charles Moses, General Manager of the Australian Broadcasting Corporation and personal friend of Bradman, asked that Bradman's Test batting average be immortalised as the post office box number of the ABC. The ABC's mailing address in every capital city of Australia is PO Box 9994. There is some debate about whether the story is true, but ABC sports host Karen Tighe confirms that the number was in fact chosen in honour of Bradman, and the claim is also supported by Alan Eason in his book The A–Z of Bradman. However, the broadcaster was not assigned the box number until after Moses's successor, Sir Talbot Duckmanton, had retired. The ABC's national toll-free telephone number is 13 9994.

In 2000, the Australian Government made it illegal for the names of corporations to suggest a link to "Sir Donald Bradman", if such a link does not in fact exist. Other entities with similar protection are the Australian and foreign governments, the Royal Family, and ex-servicemen's organisations.

Don Bradman Cricket 14, a video game for the PlayStation 3, Xbox 360 and Microsoft Windows was released in 2014.
