= Thomas Bulch =

Australian musician and composer

Thomas Edward Bulch
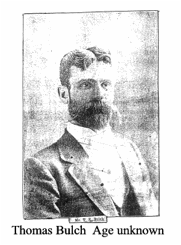
- Born: 30 December 1862; New Shildon, Durham, England
- Died: 13 November 1930 (aged 67); Mascot, Sydney, New South Wales, Australia
- Occupation: Composer
- Known for: Australian Brass Band Music Composition

Thomas Edward Bulch (30 December 1862 – 13 November 1930) was an English-born Australian musician and composer.

== Biography ==
Brewster's Millions Waltz 1908 by Thomas Bulch
MIDI version

Happy Thoughts Schottishe 1875
Midi Version

Bulch was born in New Shildon, Durham, one of thirteen children, living at 48 Adelaide Street, New Shildon. His father was a timekeeper at the Shildon Locomotive Works. On leaving school Thomas became apprenticed as a fitter at the same works. Both his father and uncles were bandsmen in local bands and it was not long before Thomas started to learn music. He started playing the piano, largely teaching himself, then with the help of his father moved on to brass instruments.

He showed a great aptitude for music in his early years and it was at the age of 12 that he joined a junior band formed by his uncle Mr. Dinsdale. The Dinsdale family, his mother's relatives, lived close to the Bulch Family in New Shildon. During this period with the junior band, Thomas started to compose music and at the age of 17 composed his first contest march, "The Typhoon". At the age of 19 he took over from his uncle, as bandmaster.

At the age of 21, Thomas migrated to Australia on the ship Gulf of Venice. Friends had suggested he go there, as he would have good prospects in the music field. Thomas also had friends in Australia who finally influenced him to join them. It was further said that he came to Australia for health reasons.

Shortly after his arrival in Creswick, Thomas was asked to take control of the 3rd Battalion Band. It was with this band that he entered his first competition in 1886. This was at the "Creswick Miners Sports" where the band took first place. In about 1886 he was also bandmaster of the Ballarat Temperance Brass Band. Following a dispute with the Commanding Officer in 1886/7 Thomas resigned as bandmaster of the 3rd Battalion band. He then formed "Bulch's Model Band", a private band. Some of the bandsmen also resigned from the 3rd battalion band and joined him as members of the "Model Band". Bulch's Model Band was renamed the Ballarat City Brass Band in 1900, and later became the City of Ballarat Municipal Band which still exists today.

His two sons both enlisted in the Australian armed forces during the First World War. Youngest son, Corporal John (Jack) Bulch served in France in the 22nd Battalion but returned to Australia in 1919 aboard the Chemnitz transport ship. Elder son Sergeant Thomas Edward Bulch Junior (Service number 1149) served in Alexandria, Gallipoli and was then killed in France in 1916.

Thomas died on 13 November 1930 at his home in the Sydney suburb of Mascot.

== Music ==
Thomas wrote music as a living. Apart from his need for income to support his family he had a great love for composing and spent much of his time at the piano working on his music. He wrote under many pseudonyms and it is difficult now to identify all his work. Some of the better known names he used are Godfrey Parker, Henri Laski, Pat Cooney and Eugene Lecosta. These are but a few of the names used. He also created arrangements for brass and military bands of the works of other composers; some from opera and the classics such as Meyerbeer, Weber and Rossini; others from the works of popular contemporary composers of his day such as Carl Volti (a pseudonym for Glaswegian violinist Archibald Milligan) and Charles le Thiere (a pseudonym for London-based composer and conductor Thomas Wilby Tomkins) occasionally leading to the names of such to be occasionally mistakenly conflated with that of Bulch himself.

He wrote and dedicated compositions to all the female members of his family. For his wife, he dedicated the music and song “My Darling Wife” and a waltz “My Polly”. His eldest daughter Adeline had the compositions titled “Little Dark Eyes” and “Adelina” written for her. His second daughter, Myrtle May had a waltz “Les Fleurs D’Australie” (Flowers of Australia) dedicated to her, and the names of Myrtle and Adeline were combined to name a waltz “Myrine”.

His youngest daughter Alice had her name combined with that of her husband Norman (Johnson) to title a waltz “Noralla” and a mazurka using her name as the title, “Alice Bertha”.

The composition “Craigielee” composed by Thomas (using the pen name Godfrey Parker) is said to have a connection with the music of “Waltzing Matilda”. It has been written that a Christina MacPherson heard it being played at the Warrnambool Races in 1894. She later played it from memory in Queensland and Banjo Paterson put words to it.

Thomas was in contact with his wife's grandmother Elizabeth Paterson during her lifetime. She had emigrated to Australia and lived at Inglewood in Victoria. Her maiden name was Craigie and he composed and dedicated the march “Craigielee” to her as a tribute using the name Godfrey Parker as the composer. Thomas had made a practice of writing and dedicating music to all the female members of the family. In discussion with Adeline Bulch several years after her father's death she mentioned the soldiers returning from France whistling a popular song that she said was set to her father's music. This she identified as “Waltzing Matilda”. She also said that a woman had written to her father requesting permission to use the music, as she wanted to put words to it. Thomas had replied that he no longer had copyright of the music. It is widely thought that Thomas based Craigielee on James Barr's setting of Robert Tannahill's poem “Thou Bonnie Wood o' Craigielee” (now commonly spelled as “Craigielea”). The tune of “Waltzing Matilda” is similar to Barr's melody and to Bulch's composition.

== Critical reception ==
On the domestic scene, Thomas Bulch works were frequently played as far afield as Kalgoorlie His notoriety was used as a yardstick to compare other composers of his time His works were published in the United States and Britain His fame is reflected in eulogy. and beyond.

As of 2025, ten of Bulch's marches are on the Prescribed March List of the National Band Council of Australia, which outlines marches that are permitted for brass band contests.

Thomas Bulch was considered a paragon for brass players

== Works ==
=== Marches ===
Marches marked with an asterisk (*) are included in the Prescribed March List for the Australian National Band Championships.

- A.B.C.D.E.F*
- Antipodes*
- Baby Elephant (1906) (score lost?)
- Bathurst
- Belgian Guards, The: Quick March (1895)
- Bendigo* (1908)
- Canterbury Engineers*
- Craigielee
- El Ave
- General Joffre
- Gibraltar*
- The Jubilee March (1887)
- Kitcheners Army: March Past (1914)
- Newcastle*
- Newtown*
- On the War Path
- The Postman's Parade* (1900)
- Sandhurst
- Second to None*
- South Street Parade*
- Torchlight Parade

=== Other works ===
- Austral: overture
- Bombardment of Port Arthur: fantasia: grand naval divertimento
- Chiselhurst – quadrille
- Ernani – fantasia
- Gems of America: selection
- Gigantique: grand overture
- Jamie Stewart's birthday: Scotch patrol
- Kilties, The – quadrille
- Land of the shamrock: quadrille (Irish)
- Meltonville: lancers / T.E. Bulch
- Memories of England – see Memories of England on YouTube
- Memories of Erin: selection / Thos. E. Bulch
- Miranda: intermezzo
- Nada: valse (as Henri Laski)
- Noralla: valse – For Piano
- Phonograph – quadrille
- The Pro: solo polka
- Roberto – quadrille
- Sacred gems: sacred fantasia
- Sydney by Night
- The tripod: solo tongueing polka see Tripod on YouTube
- Young Recruit, The: descriptive fantasia
