= Bradman (disambiguation) =

Don Bradman (1908–2001) was an Australian cricketer.

Bradman may also refer to:

- HMS Bradman, a Royal Navy anti-submarine trawler sunk in 1940, named for Don Bradman
- 2472 Bradman, an asteroid, named for Don Bradman
- Bradman Oval, a cricket grounds in Bowral, New South Wales, Australia
- Bradman (crossword compiler), one of the pseudonyms of Don Manley

== People with the name ==
- Godfrey Bradman (1936–2022), British property developer
- Greta Bradman, Australian operatic soprano, granddaughter of Don Bradman
- John Bradman (born 1939), Australian academic, son of Don Bradman
- Sam Bradman (born 1990), American lacrosse player
- Tony Bradman (born 1954), English children's author
- Bradman Best (born 2001), Australian rugby league player
- Bradman Ediriweera (born 1975), Sri Lankan cricketer
- Bradman Weerakoon (1930–2025), Sri Lankan civil servant

== See also ==
- Don Bradman (disambiguation)
