= Jumbuck =

Australian term for a male sheep

Jumbuck is an Australian term of Aboriginal origin for a male sheep, and is featured in Banjo Paterson's poem "Waltzing Matilda".

== Terminology ==
The word may come from a Gamilaraay (Indigenous Australian) word, dhimba, of unknown meaning.

A different etymology was offered by Edward Morris in 1898: "Jumbuck is aboriginal pidgin-English for sheep. Often used in the bush. The origin of this word was long unknown. It is thus explained by Mr. Meston, in the Sydney Bulletin, April 18, 1896: The word jumbuck for sheep appears originally as jimba, jombock, dombock, and dumbog. In each case it meant the white mist preceding a shower, to which a flock of sheep bore a strong resemblance. It seemed the only thing the aboriginal mind could compare it to."

In an account of a police expedition in 1841 to capture Maraura people from the region west of the junction of the Murray and Darling rivers, the following passage occurs:

"... we found that the whole of the sheep had long before been slaughtered, as we saw their carcasses and bones thrown about in vast heaps in various places where the blacks had formed large encampments, and had folded the sheep; and though we saw and chased thirteen natives, (the only number seen on our side of the river, though numerous enough, on the other), they were ever too closer to the water's edge to admit of our securing them, for they took to the river when driven through the high reeds on its banks, and which rose above our heads when on horseback, and thus, from the want of boats, escaped us, though only a few yards distant. They might, all with certainty, have been shot, but when they found we would not fire, the villains laughed at and mocked us, roaring out "plenty sheepy," "plenty jumbuck," (another name of theirs for sheep) ..."

The Taungurung word 'white clouds' is dumbok.

A news report from 1839 noted that Indigenous people from the region around Yass, New South Wales used the word jimbuck to describe sheep.
