= God Bless Australia =

Proposed Australian national anthem

God Bless Australia was a proposed 1961 Australian national anthem by Australian songwriter Jack O'Hagan who provided patriotic lyrics to the traditional tune of Waltzing Matilda.

== Lyrics ==
Credits: Music by Marie Cowan, Lyrics by Jack O'Hagan.

Here in this God given land of ours, Australia
This proud possession, our own piece of earth
That was built by our fathers, who pioneered our heritage,
Here in Australia, the land of our birth.

REFRAIN

God bless Australia, Our land Australia,
Home of the Anzac, the strong and the free
It's our homeland, our own land,
To cherish for eternity,
God bless Australia, The land of the free.

Here in Australia, we treasure love and liberty,
Our way of life, all for one, one for all
We're a peace loving race, but should danger ever threaten us,
Let the world know we will answer the call

REFRAIN (×2)

== Corporate sponsorship ==
The song was given airplay in cinema advertisements in Australia by Ampol, an Australian Petrol Company, with a 45rpm record sold by the company. "God Bless Australia" was broadcast in honour of Australia Day (26 January) in 1968 via various television channels. This version was sung by Neil Williams, backed by an orchestra and chorus, which were recorded at Melbourne's GTV-9 studios. At that time, O'Hagan dismissed "Advance Australia Fair" as a possible national anthem, "[it] never developed into a national song. You can't make a national song overnight. It just evolves. That's why holding competitions to find one are not successful." O'Hagan also felt the original lyrics to "Waltzing Matilda" were not suitable for an anthem, dismissing it as undignified. STW-9 in Perth used this for their sign offs from 1977 until they went 24/7 in 1983.
