= James Barr (composer) =

Scottish composer

James Barr (1779–1860) was a Scottish composer who composed the tune which inspired the tune now used for the Australian traditional song "Waltzing Matilda."

Born in Tarbolton in South Ayrshire, Barr taught music and worked for a publisher in Glasgow. Barr set several poems by his friend Robert Tannahill to music.

Barr emigrated for Canada in 1832, where he worked as a farmer until 1855. He died in Kilbarchan in Renfrewshire, Scotland.
