= Waltzing Matilda =

Australian song

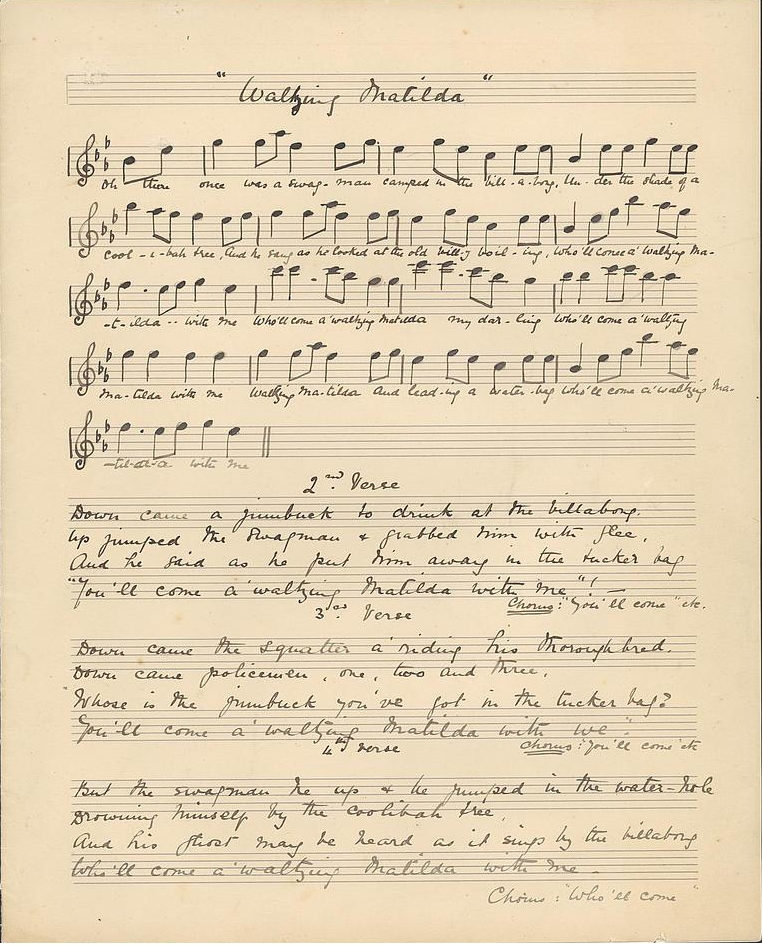
- Original manuscript, transcribed by Christina Macpherson, c. 1895

Song
- Written: 1895
- Genre: Bush ballad
- Lyricist: Banjo Paterson

Audio sample
- Christina Macpherson's Waltzing Matilda: file; help

"Waltzing Matilda" is a song in the Australian style of poetry and folk music called a bush ballad. It has been described as the country's "unofficial national anthem".

The title was Australian slang for travelling on foot (waltzing) with one's belongings in a "matilda" (swag) slung over one's back. The song tells the story of a swagman (itinerant worker) boiling his billy at a bush camp near a billabong (oxbow lake) and capturing a stray jumbuck (sheep) to eat. When the jumbuck's owner, a squatter (pastoral landholder), and three troopers (mounted policemen) try to arrest the swagman for theft, he declares "You'll never catch me alive!" and commits suicide by drowning himself in the billabong, after which his ghost haunts the site.

The original lyrics were composed in 1895 by the Australian poet Banjo Paterson, to a tune played by Christina MacPherson based on her memory of Thomas Bulch's march Craigielee, which was in turn based on James Barr's setting for Robert Tannahill's poem "Thou Bonnie Wood o Craigielee".

The first published setting of "Waltzing Matilda" was by Harry Nathan on 20 December 1902. Nathan wrote a variation of Christina MacPherson's melody and changed some of the words. The Sydney tea merchant James Inglis, who wanted to use "Waltzing Matilda" as an advertising jingle for Billy Tea, purchased the rights to "Waltzing Matilda" in early 1903, and asked Marie Cowan, the wife of one of his managers, to try her hand at turning it into an advertising jingle. Cowan made some more changes to the words, as well as some very minor changes to Nathan's melody, and gave the song a simple, brisk, harmonious accompaniment which made it very catchy. Her song, published in 1903, grew in popularity, and Cowan's arrangement remains the best-known version of "Waltzing Matilda".

Extensive folklore surrounds the song and the process of its creation, to the extent that it has its own museum, the Waltzing Matilda Centre in the Queensland outback town of Winton, where Paterson wrote the lyrics. In 2012, to remind Australians of the song's significance, Winton organised the inaugural Waltzing Matilda Day to be held on 6 April, wrongly thought at the time to be the anniversary of its first performance.

The song was first recorded in 1926, performed by John Collinson and Russell Callow. In 2008, that recording of "Waltzing Matilda" was added to the Sounds of Australia registry in the National Film and Sound Archive, which said that there are more recordings of "Waltzing Matilda" than any other Australian song.

== History ==
=== Writing of the song ===
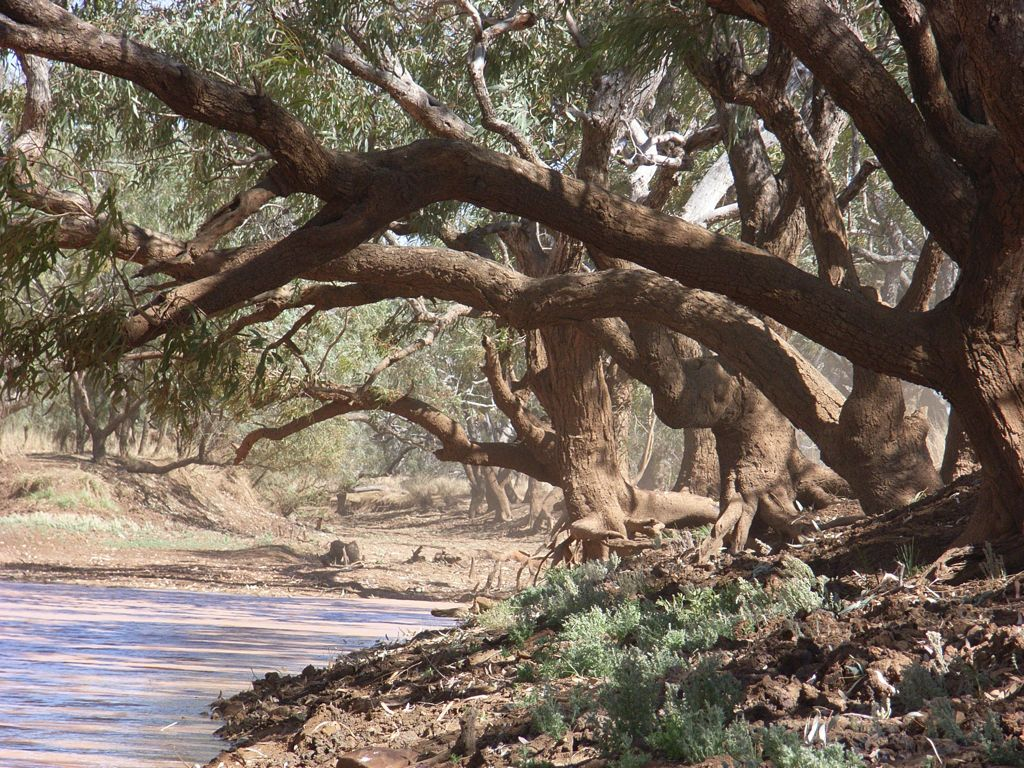
Combo Waterhole, thought to be the location that inspired the story of "Waltzing Matilda"

In 1895, Andrew Barton Paterson was living in Sydney, making his living as a solicitor. During this time, Paterson also wrote poetry and worked as a freelance journalist, both of which were published under the pen name of "The Banjo". Banjo was the name of his favourite horse on his father's farm. Paterson's poetry became unexpectedly popular, eventually resulting in his identity being publicly revealed. At some point in 1895, Paterson took a holiday from his day job, probably in early August. He made a journey of at least five days to visit Sarah Riley, his fiancée of seven years, in Winton, central-western Queensland and to see how people lived on the enormous, remote sheep stations in the district.

On arriving in Winton, Banjo attended a gathering where Christina Macpherson, Sarah's friend from school days in St Kilda, Melbourne, played some music to entertain those present. One tune caught Banjo's attention. In Christina's own words, "Mr Paterson asked me what it was – I could not tell him & he then said that that he thought that he could write some lines to it. He then and there wrote the first verse." The rest of the song was written and rehearsed over a period of some three or four weeks in August and early September at a number of locations. Credible accounts exist of the later verses being written at Dagworth Station, a sheep station 130 kilometres (81 miles) north-west of Winton in Central West Queensland, owned by the Macpherson family. Paterson and others have left accounts of the song being written at Dicks Creek, en route to Winton from Dagworth Station. The song was then sung, with piano accompaniment, in a house in Winton (owned by members of the Riley family). There is photographic evidence of the song, at an advanced stage, being sung at Oondooroo Station, again with piano accompaniment. When no piano was available, the instrument that Christina played was a small, very early model of an instrument called a volkszither or akkordzither in Germany. In America, where it became very popular, it was called an autoharp.

On 24 April 1894, Christina had attended the annual Warrnambool steeplechase meeting in south western Victoria. The music at the meeting was provided by the Warrnambool Garrison Artillery Band. The first item played by the band was the quick march "Craigielee", composed by English-born Australian Thomas Bulch, in or before 1891, using the pseudonym Godfrey Parker. "Craigielee" was a typical march with three strains. The first strain in the main section was based on "Thou Bonny Wood of Craigie Lee", composed by Glasgow musician James Barr, published in 1818 for Robert Tannahill's poem "Thou Bonnie Wood o Craigielee" which was written prior to 1806. Christina had a good memory for songs and, when she had the opportunity, tried to play the first strain by ear on piano at her relatives' house Meningoort, near Camperdown, Victoria. Christina's memory was not perfect. The first strain of "Craigielee" had the musical form AABC. Christina remembered the AAB section and put it into her tune as bars 1–12. For some reason she did not add the C section to her song as bars 13–16. To complete her tune, Christina repeated the second A section. Christina's tune had the musical form AABA. This is the musical form of "Waltzing Matilda" sung today.

When Christina arrived at Dagworth in June 1895 she found an autoharp with three or four chord bars, which belonged to the bookkeeper, John Tait Wilson. As there was no piano at Dagworth, Christina learned to play this autoharp. Within seven weeks she was able to play the tune that she heard at Warrnambool, well enough to catch the attention of Banjo Paterson. During the rest of her stay at Dagworth she mastered it.

About seven weeks after she arrived at Dagworth, Christina and her brothers went into Winton for a week or so. This coincided with the time that Banjo Paterson arrived to meet Sarah Riley. Banjo and Sarah were immediately invited to join the group returning to Dagworth Station. This was an irresistible temptation for a man venturing into the outback, the 'never-never' for the first time. During his stay, Paterson would have seen the places, heard the stories and encountered the people who inspired the lyrics of the original "Waltzing Matilda".

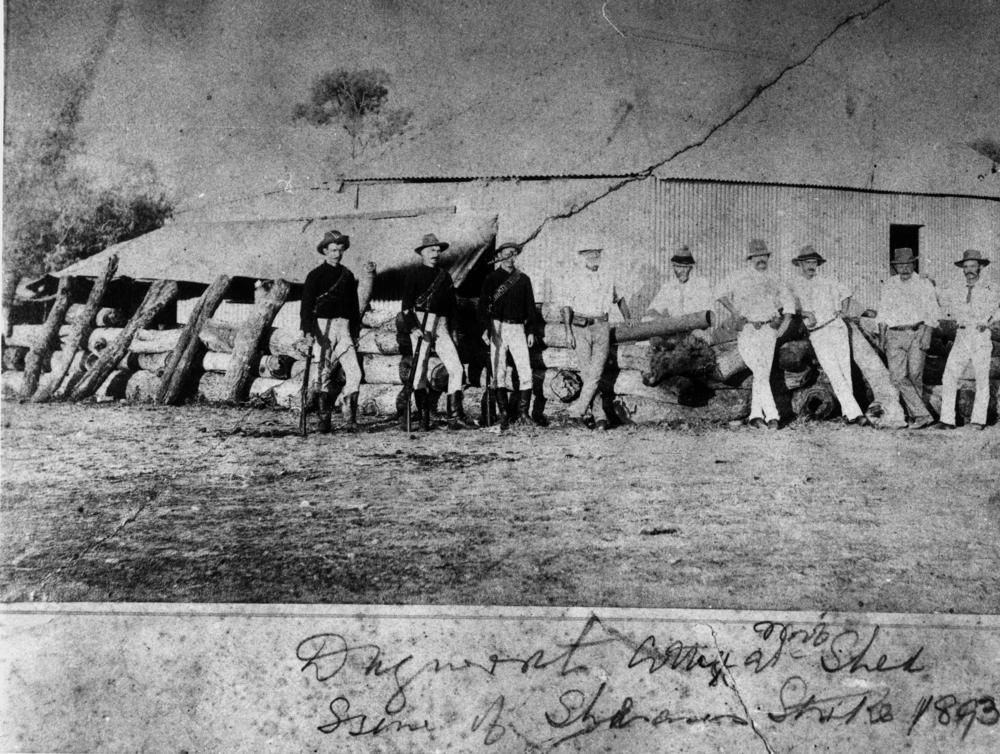
Fortified temporary shearing shed at Dagworth Station following the 1894 arson of the main shed. The three troopers at left may be those referred to in "Waltzing Matilda", while the squatter was Bob Macpherson, fourth from right.

=== Possible inspirations ===
In Queensland, in 1891, the Great Shearers' Strike brought the colony close to civil war and was broken only after the Premier of Queensland, Samuel Griffith, called in the military. In July and August 1894, as the shearing season approached, the strike broke out again in protest at a wage and contract agreement proposed by the squatters. During July and August, seven shearing sheds in central Queensland were burned by striking union shearers before shearing could begin with non-union labour. Early on the morning of 2 September, a group of striking union shearers, firing rifles and pistols, set fire to the shearing shed at Dagworth. The fire killed over a hundred sheep. The shed was defended by Constable Michael Daly, Bob Macpherson and his brothers and employees. In the early afternoon of the same day, Senior Constable Austin Cafferty, in Kynuna, was informed that a man had shot himself at a striking shearers' camp in a billabong 4 miles (6.4 km) from Kynuna and about 15 miles (24 km) from Dagworth. When he arrived at the camp, S/C Cafferty found the body of Samuel Hoffmeister, also known as "Frenchy", with a bullet wound through the mouth, in an apparent suicide. Hoffmeister was a known leader of the striking unionists and suspected of being involved in the arson attack at Dagworth on the night before. Later S/C Cafferty was joined by Constable Michael Daly, who had travelled from Dagworth. Three days later, a Coronial inquest into Hoffmeister's death was held at Kynuna Station. Police Magistrate, Ernest Eglington, travelled from Winton to conduct it. Dr Welford accompanied him to carry out a post mortem. Evidence was given by shearers who were in the camp when Hoffmeister died. The coroner found that the cause of Hoffmeister's death was "suicide" – a single gunshot to the mouth. That finding has, in 2010, been questioned.

Banjo Paterson was a first-class horseman and loved riding. It is likely that he would have seized any opportunity to go riding at Dagworth. Bob Macpherson (the brother of Christina) and Paterson went riding together and, in Christina's words, "they came to a waterhole (or billabong) & found the skin of a sheep which had been recently killed—all that had been left by a swagman". This incident may have inspired the second verse. Tom Ryan worked at Dagworth in 1895 and recorded an incident in which Paterson accompanied Dagworth horse breaker, Jack Lawton, when he went to the Combo to bring in a mob of horses. They brought them part of the way in and then put them against a fence running into a waterhole. Lawton then took the saddle from his horse and gave it a swim. He then stripped off and dived from a gum tree into the waterhole. Paterson followed suit. Jack then noticed that the mob of horses were walking away and would probably go back to their starting point. He jumped on his own horse without waiting to don any clothes and galloped after the mob. He was surprised, on looking around, to find his companion had again followed his example. On reaching the station that night, Paterson told him it was the best day's outing he had ever had.

Banjo's stay at Dagworth Station was short. He would have spent at least 16 days travelling during his absence from Sydney. While claims are made that he attended Combo Waterhole, they are not confirmed by Banjo or others who were present at the time of any visit there. There is no evidence that Banjo made the 52 kilometres (32 miles) round trip to the Four Mile Billabong where Hoffmeister's body was found. It is highly unlikely that he would have had time to do so during his short stay at Dagworth Station.

=== Christina's manuscripts ===
Paterson returned to Sydney in early September. Sometime later, Banjo wrote to Christina and asked her to send him a copy of the music of their song. This presented Christina with a serious problem: She played music by ear: she did not use sheet music. Writing down music from memory is quite challenging, even for musicians who read music well. It is extremely challenging for one who does not. In Christina's own words, "I am no musician but did my best." She managed to get hold of some 12-stave manuscript paper and wrote a first draft, writing down the notes of her song on the stave, as little open circles, at the pitch, and in the order that she remembered them. She will have used a piano to help her do this. She made no effort to indicate the lengths of the notes. In bar 9, Christina wrote the first 2 notes as a C. This was a mistake: they should have been B flat. She corrected this in a later manuscript. Christina had a very good ear, but, unfortunately, she had very limited ability to represent the time value of notes. Her full drafts have many mistakes. Some are minor and easily corrected, while some are fundamentally wrong. Christina's final drafts do not accurately represent the melody that she sang, and as written, they are unplayable. Despite this, it is possible to infer, with considerable accuracy, the melody of the tune that Christina recalled when she eventually drafted the manuscript, and it established the Scottish origin of the song.

It is not known when Banjo wrote to Christina or where Christina was when the manuscripts were written. She may have still been in Queensland or she may have returned to Melbourne. She wrote at least three full drafts of the song. She kept one, now known as the Macpherson manuscript. She sent one to Banjo and gave another to W. B. Bartlam, the manager of a station adjoining Dagworth at the time. This one is now known as the Bartlam-Roulston manuscript. The Bartlam-Roulston manuscript has the correct notes at the beginning of bar 9, indicating that it was written after the Macpherson manuscript. The manuscript that Christina kept was passed down to her sister, Margaret (McArthur) who in turn passed it down to her daughter, Diana (Baillieu). It was made public in 1992 and was later donated it to the National Library of Australia. The Bartlams knew what their manuscript was, but no one believed them until 1971. This allowed some myths about the song to grow. Both full drafts and the first draft are held at the National Library of Australia. The manuscript sent to Paterson was lost.

=== Memories and miscellanea ===
Some 40 years later, and not long before Christina died, Christina and Banjo each left different accounts of their recollection of the events surrounding the writing of "Waltzing Matilda". In the early 1930s, English musician Dr Thomas Wood worked his way around Australia as a music examiner and searched for Australian folk songs. He was captivated by "Waltzing Matilda". In 1931, the Argus newspaper reported him saying that 'Waltzing Matilda' was written on a moment's inspiration by Banjo Paterson, his sister composing the music equally spontaneously. In 1934, in his book "Cobbers", Wood wrote a brief, colourful, but very incomplete account of the composition of "Waltzing Matilda". Christina carefully drafted a letter to him to set the record straight but did not date or send it. In it, Christina stated that when the first verse was written, she had travelled to Winton with her brothers and that she had heard the music played by a band at Warrnambool. Christina then added more information from 1895 through to the song's inclusion in the "Australasian Students Song Book", which was published in 1911. Christina had a comprehensive memory and was proud of her role in producing the song. About the same time, for a talk on ABC radio, Paterson wrote that in 1894 the shearers staged a strike by way of expressing themselves, and Macpherson's shearing shed was burnt down, and a man was picked up dead. .... while resting for lunch or changing horses on our four-in-hand-journeys, Miss Macpherson, afterwards the wife of financial magnate, J McCall McCowan, used to play a little Scottish tune on a zither, and I put words to the tune and called it "Waltzing Matilda". These scanty details complement Christina's account but do not suggest that the song meant a lot to him. Paterson also attributed the playing of the music to the wrong Macpherson sister. Christina's sister Jean married McCall McCowan. Christina never married. As time passed, Banjo's memories of his trip to Dagworth faded.

Some 30 years later again and also for a talk on ABC radio, Hugh Paterson, Banjo's son, wrote his recollection of what Banjo had told him about the role that the autoharp played in the composition of "Waltzing Matilda". When Christina played her tune derived from "Bonnie Wood of Craigielea", Banjo said, "I told her that I thought I could write some whimsical words to match the tune's appeal to me ... We were too far out in the 'never-never' for pianos. But Miss Macpherson played it for me on an autoharp while I wrote the words that seemed to me to express its whimsicality and dreaminess."

For many years, it was believed that the song was first performed on 6 April 1895 by Sir Herbert Ramsay, 5th Bart., at the North Gregory Hotel in Winton, Queensland. The occasion was a banquet for the Premier of Queensland. This day is still celebrated as 'Waltzing Matilda Day'. In fact, Christina, Jean and Ewen Macpherson left Melbourne on the SS Wodonga on 1 June 1895 and the song was not written until probably late August. "Waltzing Matilda" was certainly not sung on 6 April 1895. Sir Herbert Ramsay did sing "Waltzing Matilda" when Bob Macpherson, Christina and Banjo visited Oondooroo Station, owned by the Ramsay family probably in the first week of September 1895. Herbert was dressed up as a swagman and his photo was taken.

Barrister, Trevor Monti, made a study of the transcript of the Coronial inquest into the death of Samuel Hoffmeister. In February 2010, ABC News reported his opinion that the death of Hoffmeister was more akin to a gangland assassination than to suicide.

=== Alternative theories ===
Given the tumultuous events of the shearers' strike and the burning down of 8 shearing sheds in the Winton & Kynuna districts in 1894, and given Paterson's socialist views, it is not difficult to see why historians look for a political allegory in the words of "Waltzing Matilda", penned in the districts in 1895. Ross Fitzgerald, emeritus professor in history and politics at Griffith University, argued that the defeat of the strike only a year or so before the song's creation, would have been in Paterson's mind, most likely consciously but at least "unconsciously", and thus was likely to have been an inspiration for the song. Fitzgerald stated, "the two things aren't mutually exclusive"—a view shared by others, who, while not denying the significance of Paterson's relationship with Macpherson, nonetheless recognise the underlying story of the shearers' strike and Hoffmeister's death in the lyrics of the song.

According to writer, Mathew Richardson, the 'swagman', at his most corporeal, is Frenchy Hoffmeister, who actually committed suicide by a billabong ... In a more general way, the swagman represents the 'free citizen, the itinerant with no vote, no award, no arbitration, standing for the union'.

These theories were not shared by other historians. In 2008, Australian writers and historians Peter and Sheila Forrest claimed that the widespread belief that Paterson had penned the ballad as a socialist anthem, inspired by the Great Shearers' Strike, was false and a "misappropriation" by political groups. The Forrests asserted that Paterson had in fact written the self-described "ditty" as part of his flirtation with Christina Macpherson, despite his engagement to Sarah Riley.

The original words of the first two lines of the first chorus of 'Waltzing Matilda' are, 'Who'll come a'waltzing Matilda my darling? Who'll come a'waltzing Matilda with me?' In 2019, in Waltzing Matilda – Australia's Accidental Anthem, W. Benjamin Lindner asks two questions. "Is 'Waltzing Matilda' a serenade and who was the 'darling' to whom Paterson posed the question, 'Who'll come a'waltzing Matilda with me?'" Lindner gives the unequivocal answer, "'Waltzing Matilda' is a serenade to Paterson's musical muse, Christina."

Graham Seal, Professor of Folklore at Curtin University, WA, wrote that "Waltzing Matilda" is – "let's be honest – a pretty silly ditty about a swaggie knocking off a sheep and throwing himself in the billabong when the squatter and the cops turn up."

Several alternative theories for the origins of the words of "Waltzing Matilda" have been proposed since the time it was written. Some oral stories collected during the twentieth century claimed that Paterson had merely modified an existing bush song, but there is no evidence for this. In 1905, Paterson himself published a book of bush ballads he had collected from around Australia entitled Old Bush Songs, with nothing resembling "Waltzing Matilda" in it. Nor do any other publications or recordings of bush ballads include anything to suggest it preceded Paterson. Meanwhile, manuscripts from the time the song originated indicate the song's origins with Paterson and Christina Macpherson, as do their own recollections and other pieces of evidence.

=== History of the music ===
The story of "Waltzing Matilda" began in West Paisley, Scotland, about 2 kilometres (1.2 miles) south of where Glasgow airport is today. Robert Tannahill, the weaver poet, wrote a poem, "Thou Bonnie Wood of Craigielea", prior to 1806. It was written in the pattern chorus, verse, chorus, verse, ready to be set to music. Tannahill's friend James Barr set it to music, and it was published in 1818. Barr's song was unusually melodious: it used four 4-bar phrases in a 16-bar song. It had the musical form ABCD. In 1850, an arrangement was published in 'The Lyric Gems of Scotland', page 65, which was written in the pattern verse, chorus, verse, chorus, and it dropped the second phrase of the verse and repeated the first. It had the musical form AABC. In 1880, an arrangement by T S Gleadhill, published in 'Kyles Scottish Lyric Gems', pages 244, 245, also dropped the second phrase of the verse and repeated the first. Thomas Bulch, an English expat living in Australia, wrote a quick march arrangement for brass band, called 'Craigielee' most likely in 1891. The opening strain of 'Craigielee' was 'Bonnie Wood of Craigielea' with the musical form AABC. It is very close to the melody in the "Lyric Gems" and perhaps even closer to the melody in Gleadhill's "Kyles Scottish Lyric Gems". This was the tune that caught Christina Macpherson's attention at the races at Warrnambool, Victoria, in 1894. Christina had a good ear and, when she next sat at a piano, she tried to play the opening strain. Christina remembered the AAB phrases and transcribed them into bars 1 to 12 of her tune. For some reason, Christina did not transcribe the C phrase into bars 13 to 16 of her tune. Instead, she repeated bars 5 to 8 in bars 13 to 16. This gave Christina's tune the musical form AABA, popular American style. This is the musical form of "Waltzing Matilda" sung today.

One more change needed to be made. The tune that Christina played for Banjo was written to set the poem "Thou Bonnie Wood of Craigielea" to music. The words of its chorus are,

Thou bonnie wood of Craigielee,
Thou bonnie wood of Craigielee,
Near thee I pass'd life's early day,
An' won my Mary's heart in thee.

The number of syllables in each line is 8, 8, 8, 7. The verses are the same.

The words of the original chorus of Christina's Waltzing Matilda are

Who'll come a Waltzing Matilda my darling?
Who'll come a waltzing Matilda with me?
Waltzing Matilda and leading a water bag,
Who'll come a waltzing Matilda with me?

The number of syllables in each line is 11, 10, 12, 10. The verses are similar.

As Banjo and Christina collaborated on their song, Christina had to add more notes to her initial tune. She did this by breaking up several notes in each line into shorter ones. While doing this, Christina retained the shape of the melody and the typical 2/4 type rhythm of 'Craigielee'. Typical of songs with multiple verses, the melody had to be changed slightly in some verses to fit the meter of the words. Christina and Banjo would have had some arguments, Christina wanting to preserve the tune and Banjo wanting the strict meter of the lyrics to be preserved. Despite this, the two tunes sound very similar. Many may even say that they are the same.

This tune did not spread very quickly: an electronic search of Australian newspapers between 1895 and 1902, using trove, reveals only two reports of 'Waltzing Matilda' being sung. On 9 October 1900, the governor of Queensland visited Winton and Mr. A. Ramsay sang 'Waltzing Matilda', "one of Banjo Patterson's ditties composed in the Winton district." On 23 November 1901, the Hughenden representative of the N.Q. Herald reported that, "'Waltzing Matilda' is all the rage here now." Three regional newspapers printed the words of the "quaint trifle", but not the tune. Some of the words had been changed and resembled the words later used by Marie Cowan.

=== Alternative theories and myths ===
There has been speculation about the similarity of "Waltzing Matilda" and a British song, "The Bold Fusilier" or "The Gay Fusilier" (also known as "Marching through Rochester", referring to Rochester in Kent and the Duke of Marlborough). Author Matthew Richardson writes that a "direct creative link is indisputable" between the two and that Banjo Paterson would have been familiar with "The Bold Fusilier" and was likely guided by the pattern and sound. "The Bold Fusilier" is dated by some to the start of the 18th century. In the early 1900s only one verse and chorus of the song were known. This snippet was printed in The Bulletin magazine in Sydney, Australia on 8 October 1941.

Verse: A gay fusilier was marching down through Rochester
Bound for the wars in the low country,
And he cried as he tramped through the drear streets of Rochester,
Who'll be a sojer for Marlboro with me?

Chorus: Who'll be a sojer, Who'll be a sojer,
Who'll be a sojer for Marlboro with me?
And he cried as he tramped through the drear streets of Rochester,
Who'll be a sojer for Marlboro with me?

The song sung today has the musical form AABA and is sung to the same tune as Marie Cowan's "Waltzing Matilda", published in Sydney, Australia, in 1903. The lyrics describe events as happening in Rochester, England, during the reign of Queen Anne, 1702 to 1714. It was widely, though not universally, accepted that the song was written at that time. English folklore authority Ralph Vaughan Williams considered that the earlier existence of the song was very doubtful because its language was not appropriate to the early eighteenth century. There is no documentary proof that "The Bold Fusilier" existed before 1900. The song has the musical form AABA, which suggests a much later origin. On the other hand, the origin of "Waltzing Matilda" can be traced from "Thou Bonny Wood of Craigie Lee" published in 1818. Hearsay evidence exists that "Waltzing Matilda" was sung by Australian soldiers in South Africa during the Boer War and that the British troops returned friendly fire by singing "The Gay/Bold Fusilier" as a parody.

In about 1970, English folk singer Peter Coe reworked the existing first verse and chorus and added another four verses. This song, a timeless comment about war, is quite popular today and has spawned other similar lyrics. Peter's song is called "The Rochester Recruiting Sergeant".

In his 1987 book, Richard Magoffin speculated that the music of "Waltzing Matilda" may have been sourced from an Irish Jig, "Go to the Devil and Shake Yourself", which was probably composed by Irishman, John Field, and which began to appear in print about 1797. In a letter to Magoffin, the City Librarian of Dublin Library said that he thought he could detect a slight resemblance in it to "Waltzing Matilda". This is very tenuous evidence. Magoffin also went to say that it would be nice to think that the Irish have played a part in providing Australia with her song.

Before the internet, researchers had limited access to recordings and other sources of old music. Online resources such as YouTube and digital collections have made such material more accessible. An audio file of "Go to the Devil and Shake Yourself" can be heard, and the sheet music can be viewed online. The available recordings and sheet music show no resemblance between the piece and "Waltzing Matilda".

=== Ownership ===
On 12 January 1903, Paterson sold the rights to "Waltzing Matilda" and "some other pieces" to Angus & Robertson for "a fiver", five Australian pounds. A good shearer could easily make more than that in a week. Very soon after, tea trader James Inglis, owner of Inglis and Co., purchased the musical rights to 'Waltzing Matilda' from Angus and Robertson for 5 guineas (5 pounds and 5 shillings). Inglis asked Marie Cowan, who was married to his accountant, to 'rejig' the song for use as an advertising jingle for the Billy Tea company, making it nationally famous. Within two months of Paterson selling the copyright, musicians could buy a copy of Marie Cowan's altered lyrics set to a new arrangement of Christina's music for 9 pence.

Although by 1996, no copyright applied to the song in Australia and many other countries, the Australian Olympic organisers had to pay royalties to an American publisher, Carl Fischer Music, following the song being played at the 1996 Summer Olympics held in Atlanta. According to some reports, the song was copyrighted by Carl Fischer Music in 1941 as an original composition. However, The Sydney Morning Herald reported that Carl Fischer Music had collected the royalties on behalf of Messrs Allan & Co, an Australian publisher that claimed to have bought the original copyright, though Allan's claim "remains unclear". Arrangements such as those claimed by Richard D. Magoffin remain in copyright in America.

== Cowan's melody ==
Over time and as they travel, folk songs tend to change. This happened to Banjo and Christina's 'Waltzing Matilda'. On 23 November 1901, the Hughenden representative of the N.Q. Herald reported that, "'Waltzing Matilda' is all the rage here just now and some clever fellow has managed to fit the quaint trifle with an exceedingly catchy air". The report contained the words, but not the tune. Some of the words had been changed. Banjo's swagman had become a jolly swagman and the second line of verse 1 was repeated as the second line of the chorus following each of the verses.

The first setting of 'Waltzing Matilda' that was published was Harry Nathan's, with Sydney publisher Palings' Brisbane office on 20 December 1902. This was two weeks before Paterson sold the rights to 'Waltzing Matilda' to Angus and Robertson. Nathan credited Banjo for the lyrics, with the music arranged and harmonized by Harry A. Nathan. Nathan changed some of the lyrics and wrote a new variation of the original tune. Banjo's swagman had become a jolly swagman who sang as he waited till his billy boiled.

Harry Nathan's Waltzing Matilda

Very soon after Paterson sold his rights on 12 January 1903, they were purchased by tea merchant James Inglis, who wanted to use 'Waltzing Matilda' as an advertising jingle for Billy Tea. By this time, Nathan's arrangement of 'Waltzing Matilda' would have been on sale at Palings Sydney shop for several weeks and Inglis would have had the opportunity to purchase it. Inglis did not find any of the existing settings satisfactory and invited Marie Cowan, the wife of one of his managers, to try her hand at it. The melody of Harry Nathan's and Marie Cowan's arrangements are so similar that one is clearly a copy of the other. Marie Cowan made some minor changes to Nathan's tune and changed a few of the lyrics. The policemen became troopers in verse 3 and the swagman cried, "You'll never take me alive." in verse 4. Cowan repeated the second line of each verse in the corresponding chorus. She gave the song a simple, brisk, harmonious accompaniment which made it very catchy. Her song, published in 1903, quickly grew in popularity and Cowan's arrangement remains the best-known version of "Waltzing Matilda".

Marie Cowan's Waltzing Matilda

Source.

== Lyrics ==
=== Typical lyrics ===
There are no official lyrics to "Waltzing Matilda" and slight variations can be found in different sources. The following lyrics are the Cowan version published as sheet music in early 1903.

Once a jolly swagman camped by a billabong
Under the shade of a coolibah tree,
And he sang as he watched and waited till his "Billy" boiled,
"You'll come a-waltzing Matilda, with me."

Chorus:
Waltzing Matilda, waltzing Matilda,
You'll come a-waltzing Matilda, with me,
And he sang as he watched and waited till his "Billy" boiled, (Note: Third line of chorus changes to match preceding verse)
"You'll come a-waltzing Matilda, with me."

Down came a jumbuck to drink at that billabong,
Up jumped the swagman and grabbed him with glee,
And he sang as he shoved (Note: Sometimes "stowed") that jumbuck in his tucker bag,
"You'll come a-waltzing Matilda, with me."

(Chorus)

Up rode the squatter, mounted on his thoroughbred.
Down came the troopers, one, two, and three.
"Whose is that jumbuck (Note: Sometimes "Where's that jolly jumbuck") you've got in your tucker bag?
You'll come a-waltzing Matilda, with me."

(Chorus)

Up jumped the swagman and sprang into the billabong.
"You'll never catch me alive!" said he
And his ghost may be heard as you pass by that billabong:
"You'll come a-waltzing Matilda, with me."

(Chorus)

=== Glossary ===
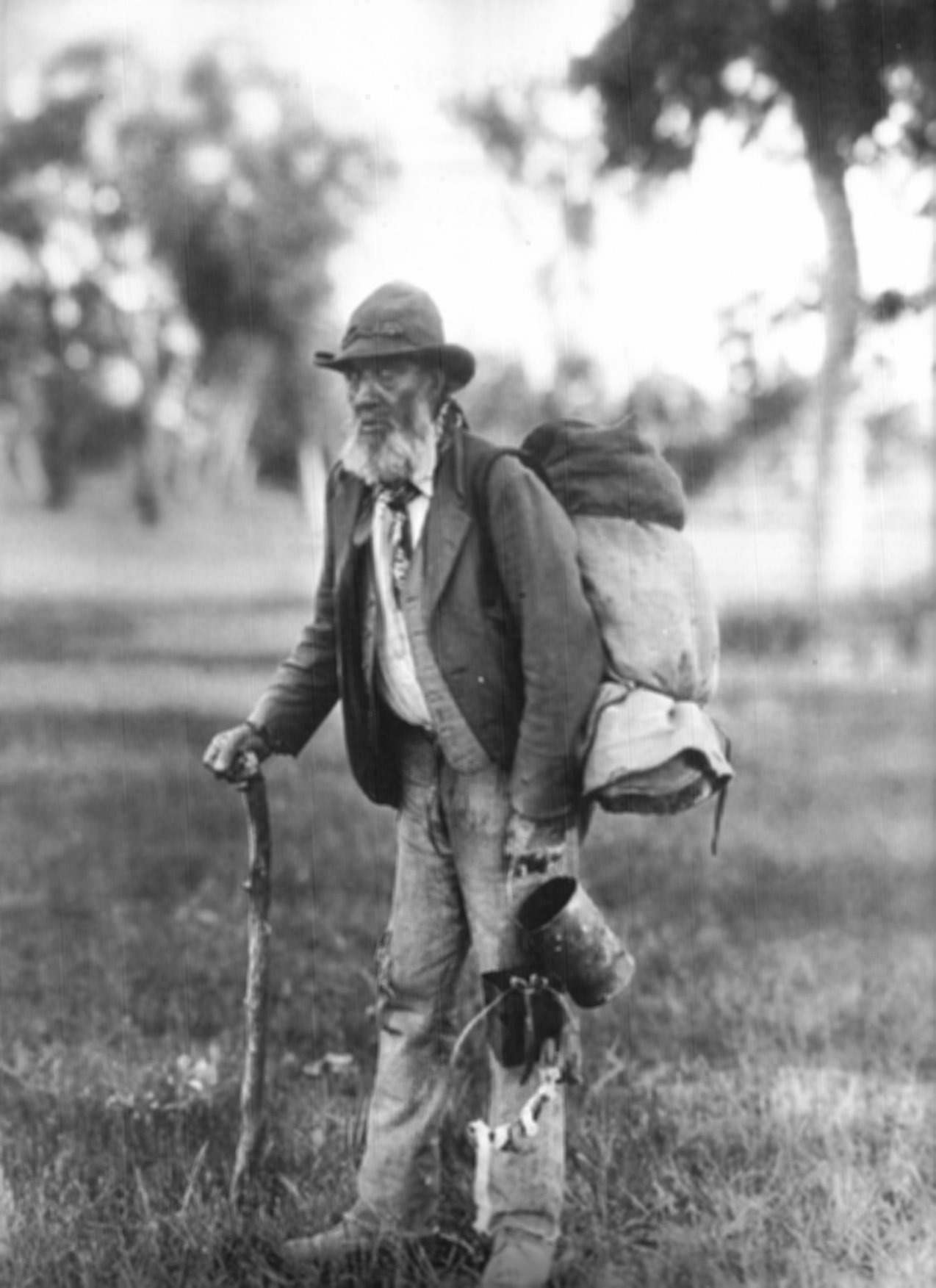
Photograph of a swagman, c. 1901, holding a billy and carrying a swag on his back

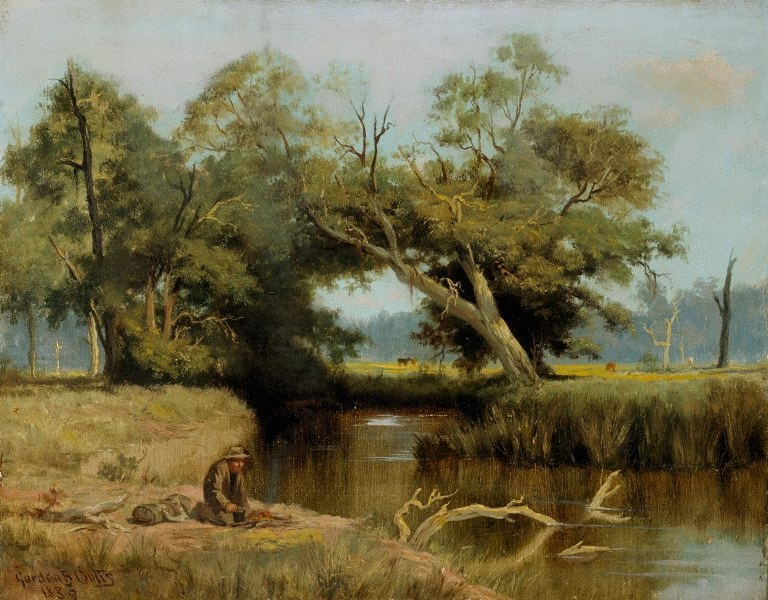
Painting of a swagman camped by a billabong, Gordon Coutts, 1889, Art Gallery of New South Wales

The lyrics contain many distinctively Australian English words, some now rarely used outside the song. These include:

billabong
an oxbow lake (a cut-off river bend) found alongside a meandering river.
billy
a can for boiling water, usually 1–1.5 litres (2–3 pints).
coolibah tree
a kind of eucalyptus tree which grows near billabongs.
jumbuck
a sheep.
Matilda
a romantic term for a swagman's bundle. See below, "Waltzing Matilda".
squatter
Australian squatters started as early farmers who raised livestock on land which they did not have the legal title to use; in many cases they later gained legal use of the land even though they did not have full possession, and became wealthy thanks to these large land holdings. The squatter's claim to the land may be as unfounded as is the swagman's claim to the jumbuck.
swagman
a man who travelled the country looking for work. The swagman's "swag" was a bed roll that bundled his belongings.
troopers
mounted policemen.
tucker bag
a bag for carrying food.
waltzing
derived from the German term auf der Walz, which means to travel while working as a craftsman and learn new techniques from other masters.
Waltzing Matilda
from the above terms, "to waltz Matilda" is to travel with a swag, that is, with all one's belongings on one's back wrapped in a blanket or cloth. The exact origins of the term "Matilda" are disputed; one fanciful derivation states that when swagmen met each other at their gatherings, there were rarely women to dance with. Nonetheless, they enjoyed a dance and so danced with their swags, which was given a woman's name. However, this appears to be influenced by the word "waltz", hence the introduction of dancing. It seems more likely that, as a swagman's only companion, the swag came to be personified as a female.

The National Library of Australia states:

Matilda is an old Teutonic female name meaning "mighty battle maid". This may have informed the use of "Matilda" as a slang term to mean a de facto wife who accompanied a wanderer. In the Australian bush a man's swag was regarded as a sleeping partner, hence his "Matilda". (Letter to Rt. Hon. Sir Winston Churchill, KG from Harry Hastings Pearce, 19 February 1958. Harry Pearce Papers, NLA Manuscript Collection, MS2765)

In Germany the terms "Waltzing Matilda" have a very specific meaning:

It refers to the tradition where craftsmen, after having completed their apprenticeship, spend 3 years away from their hometown, travelling on minimal budget, working in many places in order to acquire experience and master their craft. See Wandering journeyman for a detailed description. In this context, (Walz) or (auf der Walz) refers to this activity. And (Mathilda) is the patron saint of the road, looking after the men (and women), helping them but sometimes dealing harsh lessons.

Hence (Waltzing Matilda) would refer to the activity of a journey man traveling the road, only carrying a simple swag.

Weiter zogen wir durch die Schweiz, um uns in der Genfer Gegend neue Arbeit zu suchen. Aber Mathilda, unsere Straßengöttin, meinte es dieses Mal nicht gut mit uns. Wenn es regnete, wenn es kalt war, wenn man keinen Lift fand, kein Bett und auch keine Arbeit, dann hieß es bei uns: Kann man nichts machen, das will die Mathilda jetzt so.

[We kept travelling through Switzerland, to look for work around Geneva. But Mathilda, our patron saint of the road, was not kind to us this time. When it rains, it is icy cold, or when we couldn't find a ride, a bed for the night or even no work, then we used to say: 'no can do, this is what Mathilda wants it to be']

— Franz im Glück, Meine Wanderjahre auf der Walz (2015)

Aktuell ist also Mathilda meine beste Freundin – so nennen wir die Straße. Mathilda ist unsere Schutzpatronin, sie hilft uns, wenn wir etwas brauchen. Wenn ich mir ein warmes Bett wünsche oder an ein weit entferntes Ziel mitgenommen werden möchte, hat Mathilda bisher immer dafür gesorgt, dass es klappt.

[Currently Mathilda is my best friend – this is what we call the road. Mathilda is our patron saint. She helps us when we are in need. If I really long for a warm bed or look for a ride for a distant destination, I always found that Mathilda helped to make it work.]

— "Jeder Tag ist ein neues Abenteuer", Spiegel.de "Mein erstes Jahr im Job" (2021)

=== Variations ===
==== Original notebook ====
The lyrics of "Waltzing Matilda" have been changed since it was written. Banjo Paterson wrote the original lyrics of "Waltzing Matilda" in his notebook. When Paterson visited Winton and Dagworth in August 1895, he carried a foolscap size 1892 legal diary that was never used for legal work. In it he used to write the first draft of verses and chapters of books. On a page in the "W" section, as he composed them, Paterson penned the original words of "Waltzing Matilda". He did not include the date, the title or punctuation. In three places he made changes by crossing out the first words he wrote and replacing them. This notebook is now at the National Library of Australia, and it has been digitized. A transcript of the original words reads

Oh there once was a swagman camped in the billabong
Under the shade of a Coolibah tree
And he sang as he looked at the old billy boiling
Who'll come a-waltzing Matilda with me

Who'll come a waltzing Matilda my darling
Who'll come a waltzing Matilda with me
Waltzing Matilda and leading a water bag
Who'll come a waltzing Matilda with me

Down came a jumbuck to drink at the water hole
Up jumped the swagman and grabbed him in glee
And he sang as he put him away in the tucker bag
You'll come a waltzing Matilda with me

You'll come a waltzing Matilda my darling
You'll come a waltzing Matilda with me
Waltzing Matilda and leading a water bag
You'll come a waltzing Matilda with me

Down came the squatter a riding on his thorough-bred
Down came Policemen one, two, & three
Whose is the jumbuck you've got in the tucker-bag
You'll come a waltzing Matilda with we

You'll come a waltzing Matilda my darling
You'll come a waltzing Matilda with we
Waltzing Matilda and leading a water bag
You'll come a waltzing Matilda with we

But the swagman, he up and he jumped in the waterhole
Drowning himself by the Coolibah tree
And his ghost can be heard as it sings in the billabong,
Who'll come a waltzing Matilda with me.

Initially, the fourth line of verse 1 was, "Who'll come a rovin' Australia with me". Paterson later changed it to, "Who'll come a waltzing Matilda with me".

The first line of the first chorus began as, "Who'll come a rovin'". Paterson crossed out "rovin" and changed the line to, "Who'll come a waltzing Matilda my darling".

In line 3 of the first chorus he wrote, "Waltzing Matilda and leading a tucker bag". Paterson crossed out "tucker" and wrote, "Waltzing Matilda and leading a water bag".

Banjo added a little bit of humour. In verse 3, the squatter and the three policemen address the hapless swagman, "Whose is the jumbuck you've got in the tucker bag? You'll come a waltzing Matilda with we." The ungrammatical (in standard Australian English), comical and poetically unusual "we" was intended and was repeated in the third chorus. "We" as the object is common in some English dialects such as Geordie but incorrect and comical in standard Australian English. Christina's manuscript of "Waltzing Matilda" also has the ungrammatical "we" in the last line of verse 3. As the song changed, it was quickly forgotten.

==== 1917 version ====
The following version, considered to be the 'original', was published by Paterson himself in Saltbush Bill, J.P., and Other Verses in 1917, and appears as follows:

Oh! there once was a swagman camped in the Billabong,
Under the shade of a Coolabah tree;
And he sang as he looked at his old billy boiling,
'Who'll come a-waltzing Matilda with me.'

Who'll come a-waltzing Matilda, my darling,
Who'll come a-waltzing Matilda with me?
Waltzing Matilda and leading a water-bag—
Who'll come a-waltzing Matilda with me?

Down came a jumbuck to drink at the water-hole,
Up jumped the swagman and grabbed him in glee;
And he sang as he put him away in his tucker-bag,
'You'll come a-waltzing Matilda with me!'

Down came the Squatter a-riding his thorough-bred;
Down came Policemen – one, two, and three.
'Whose is the jumbuck you've got in the tucker-bag?
You'll come a-waltzing Matilda with we.' [sic]

But the swagman, he up and he jumped in the water-hole,
Drowning himself by the Coolabah tree;
And his ghost may be heard as it sings in the Billabong,
'Who'll come a-waltzing Matilda with me?'

==== Queensland version ====
There is also the Queensland version of "Waltzing Matilda" that is popular with folk singers. Verses 1 to 4 retain almost the exact words of the original Banjo Paterson text. The chorus is the same as the first verse of the original and is repeated unchanged after each verse. The words are set to a pretty, lilting melody with the musical form ABAB. It has no resemblance to the Macpherson/Paterson tune with the musical form AABA. It is not known who composed the tune or when it was composed. The Seekers found commercial success with this version in their second single in 1963.

Oh there once was a swagman camped in a billabong,
Under the shade of the coolibah tree;
And he sang as he looked at his old billy boiling,
'Who'll come a waltzing Matilda with me?'

Chorus:
Who'll come a-waltzing Matilda my darling?
Who'll come a-waltzing Matilda with me?
Waltzing Matilda and leading a water bag,
Who'll come a-waltzing Matilda with me?

Down came a jumbuck to drink at the water hole,
Up jumped the swagman and grabbed him with glee;
And he sang as he stowed him away in his tucker-bag,
'You'll come a-waltzing Matilda with me.'

(Chorus)

Down came the squatter a-riding his thoroughbred;
Down came policemen – one two and three.
'Whose is the jumbuck you've got in your tucker bag?
You'll come a-waltzing Matilda with me.'

(Chorus)

But the swagman he up and he jumped in the water-hole,
Drowning himself by the coolibah tree;
And his ghost may be heard as it sings in the billabong,
'Who'll come a-waltzing Matilda with me?'

(Chorus)

== Status ==
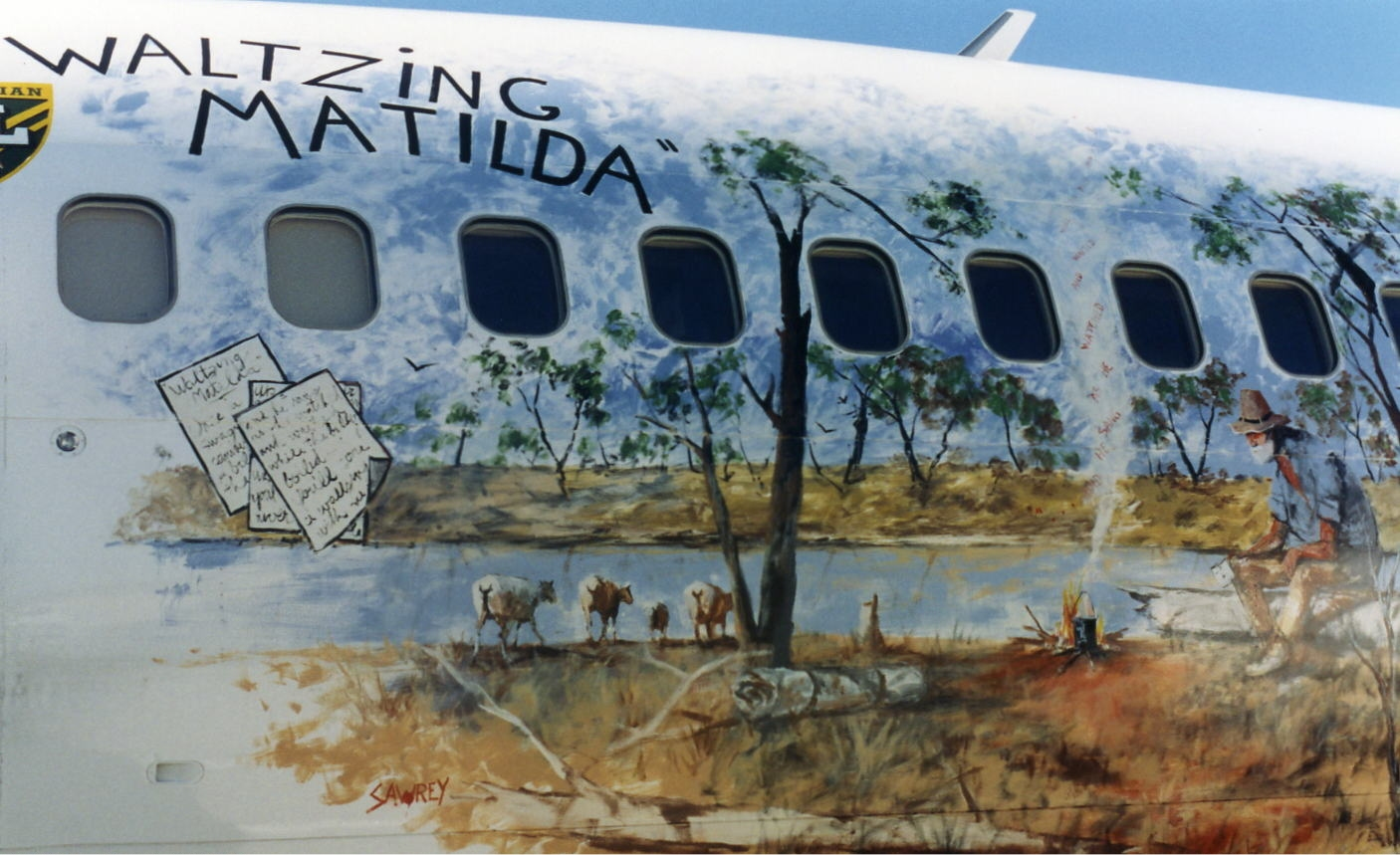
Waltzing Matilda mural on the side of an Ansett Boeing 737-300 in the mid-1990s

In May 1988 the Australasian Performing Right Association (APRA) chief executive, John Sturman, presented five platinum awards, "which recognised writers who had created enduring works which have become a major part of the Australian culture", at the annual APRA Awards ceremony as part of their celebrations for the Australian Bicentenary. One of the platinum awards was for Paterson and Cowan's version of "Waltzing Matilda".

=== Official use ===
The song has never been the officially recognised national anthem in Australia. However, from 1976 to 1984 it was one of three "national songs" that could be used in place of the then national anthem, "God Save the Queen" (except for royal or vice-regal events). The Fraser government in 1977 included "Waltzing Matilda" in a plebiscite to choose the "national song". "Waltzing Matilda" received 28% of the vote compared with 43% for "Advance Australia Fair", 19% for "God Save the Queen" and 10% for "Song of Australia". Later the Hawke government advised the declaration of "Advance Australia Fair" as the national anthem, without reference to an official "national song". Subsequent prime minister Paul Keating stated that "['Waltzing Matilda'] has long been our unofficial national song. Not our anthem. As I've said before, one can't sing too solemnly about a jumbuck. But Waltzing Matilda is Australia's song and it always will be."

Australian passports issued from 2003 have had the lyrics of "Waltzing Matilda" hidden microscopically in the background pattern of most of the pages for visas and arrival/departure stamps.

=== Sports ===
"Waltzing Matilda" was used at the 1974 FIFA World Cup and, as a response to the New Zealand All Blacks haka, it has gained popularity as a sporting anthem for the Australia national rugby union team. It would have been played at award ceremonies at the Montreal Olympic Games in 1976, but Australia received no gold medals.

Matilda the Kangaroo was the mascot at the 1982 Commonwealth Games held in Brisbane, Queensland. Matilda was a cartoon kangaroo, who appeared as a 13-metre (43 ft) high mechanical kangaroo at the opening ceremony, accompanied by Rolf Harris singing "Waltzing Matilda".

The Australian women's national soccer team is nicknamed the Matildas after this song.

Jessica Mauboy and Stan Walker recorded a version of "Waltzing Matilda" to promote the London 2012 Summer Olympics in Australia. It was released as a single on 3 August 2012.

=== Military units ===
It is used as the quick march of the 1st Battalion, Royal Australian Regiment and as the official song of the US 1st Marine Division, commemorating the time the unit spent in Australia during the Second World War. Part of the tune is used in the British Royal Tank Regiment's slow march, because an early British tank model was called "Matilda".

=== Annual Day ===
6 April has been observed as Waltzing Matilda Day annually in Australia since 2012.

== Covers and derivative works ==
In 1995, it was reported that at least 500 artists in Australia and overseas had released recordings of "Waltzing Matilda", and according to Peter Burgis of the National Film and Sound Archive, it is "one of the most recorded songs in the world". Artists and bands who have covered the song range from rock stars to children's performers such as Burl Ives; to choirs, including the Mormon Tabernacle Choir. Jimmie Rodgers had a US#41 pop hit with the song in 1959.

On 14 April 1981, on Space Shuttle Columbia's first mission, country singer Slim Dusty's rendition was broadcast to Earth. A remastered version of this rendition was later certified Gold by the Australian Recording Industry Association (ARIA).

=== Films ===
Versions of the song have been used as the title of, or been prominently featured in, a number of films and television programs.

Waltzing Matilda is a 1933 Australian film directed by and starring Pat Hanna. It features a young Coral Browne.

The first few words of the song provided the title of Once a Jolly Swagman, a 1949 British film starring Dirk Bogarde, but the film has no connection to Australia or to the story told in the song.

An animated short was made in 1958 for Australian television.

Ernest Gold used the song and variations of it extensively in the 1959 film On the Beach.

The 2017 short film Waltzing Tilda features various versions of the song, including one sung by the main character.

The song is featured in the 2019 film Deadwood: The Movie despite the film being set in 1889, six years before the song was written.

=== TV series ===
The theme song of the 1980 Australian television series Secret Valley is sung to a faster version of the tune of "Waltzing Matilda".

=== Video games ===
It is the theme song for Australia in the video game Civilization VI.

The song is the basis for the side quest "The Empty Billabong" in Borderlands: The Pre-Sequel, which was developed by 2K Australia. The player is instructed to search for a man known only as "the Jolly Swagman" at his camp under a coolibah tree where they find his tuckerbag and an audiolog where the Jolly Swagman recounts events identical to the song.

=== Stage ===
On the occasion of Queensland's 150-year celebrations in 2009, Opera Queensland produced the revue Waltzing Our Matilda, staged at the Conservatorium Theatre and subsequently touring twelve regional centres in Queensland. The show was created by Jason and Leisa Barry-Smith and Narelle French. The story line used the fictional process of Banjo Paterson writing the poem when he visited Queensland in 1895 to present episodes of four famous Australians: bass-baritone Peter Dawson (1882–1961), soprano Dame Nellie Melba (1861–1931), Bundaberg-born tenor Donald Smith (1922–1998), and soprano Gladys Moncrieff, also from Bundaberg. The performers were Jason Barry-Smith as Banjo Paterson, Guy Booth as Dawson, David Kidd as Smith, Emily Burke as Melba, Zoe Traylor as Moncrieff, and Donna Balson (piano, voice). The production toured subsequently again in several years. British guitarist Brian May performed an acoustic version of the song solo during Queen + Adam Lambert's tour of Australia in 2014.

=== Derivative musical works ===
- During the 1950s, a parody of the original entitled "Once a Learned Doctor" gained some currency in Australian university circles. It featured lyrics rewritten with reference to the split in the Australian Labor Party in the period 1954 to 1957.
- In 1961, Australian songwriter Jack O'Hagan provided new lyrics to the traditional tune, titled "God Bless Australia" (see that article for its lyrics), which he hoped would become the Australian national anthem.
- Eric Bogle's 1971 song "And the Band Played Waltzing Matilda" relates the story of a former swagman whose comrades got killed in the Gallipoli campaign and who himself lost his legs. The end of the song includes a fragment of "Waltzing Matilda".
- Rambling Syd Rumpo (played by Kenneth Williams) in the late 1960s BBC radio programme Round the Horne did a parody of "Waltzing Matilda" beginning "Once long ago in the shade of a goolie bush..."
- The Family Car Songbook (1983) presents a "translation" of the song into an "American" version, using the same tune.
- Tom Waits' 1976 song "Tom Traubert's Blues" incorporates elements of "Waltzing Matilda".
- Australian composer Harry Sdraulig's "Fantasia on Waltzing Matilda" (2020) was composed for Yo-Yo Ma and Kathryn Stott.
- Australian violinist Ray Chen's album The Golden Age, nominated for an ARIA Music Award, concludes with an arrangement for string quartet by fellow "Made in Berlin" quartet member Stephan Koncz.
