= Jack O'Hagan =

Australian singer and songwriter (1898–1987)

Jack O'Hagan OBE
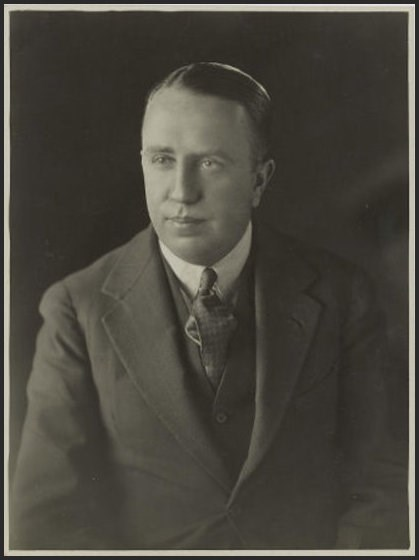

Background information
- Born: John Francis O'Hagan; 29 November 1898; Fitzroy, Victoria, Australia
- Died: 15 July 1987 (aged 88)
- Occupations: Singer, songwriter, radio personality
- Instrument: Vocals
- Years active: 1916–1961

John Francis O'Hagan (29 November 1898 – 15 July 1987) was an Australian singer-songwriter and radio personality.

== Early life ==
O'Hagan was born as John Francis O'Hagan, in Fitzroy, a suburb of Melbourne. He was the son of Pat O'Hagan, a hotelkeeper and Alice née Quinlan. He went to school at St Patrick's College and then later at Xavier College in Melbourne. His first job in the music business was at Allans Music in Melbourne – he played sheet music for potential customers. When radio was introduced to Australia, he was one of the first to broadcast for 3LO, and later on 3AW.

== Compositions ==
Between 1916 and 1961, O'Hagan wrote over 600 songs, more than 200 of which were published. Some of O'Hagan's well-known songs are:

- "Along The Road To Gundagai" 1922 (used as the theme to the Dad and Dave radio show); first performed by Bass-Baritone singer Peter Dawson in 1924 and recorded in London before selling some 40,000 to 50,000 copies in the first three months.
- "Our Don Bradman" 1930
- "Dog on the Tuckerbox" 1938
- "Ginger Meggs" 1948
- "God Bless Australia". In 1961, it was used in a film-theatre advertisement which was run during the 1960s by the then Australian petrol company, Ampol and sung to the tune of "Waltzing Matilda".
- "The Mighty Fighting Hawks" 1956 (the theme song for AFL club Hawthorn Hawks, written with club solicitor Chick Lander to the tune of "Yankee Doodle Boy" by George M. Cohan)

His music and lyrics for the stage include the musical The Flame of Desire, which premiered at Melbourne's Apollo Theatre in October 1935.

In the 1940s and 1950s, O'Hagan wrote many radio commercials and campfire songs. However, the combination of the rising popularity of rock and roll and television ended his career.

Despite writing songs about the town, O'Hagan first visited Gundagai in 1956 when he was guest of honour at the centenary celebrations of the town.

== Honours ==
O'Hagan was awarded the OBE in 1973.

== See also ==
- We're All Cobbers Together by Jack O'Hagan, arranged by Robert McAnally (1940)
