= List of international cricket centuries by Don Bradman =

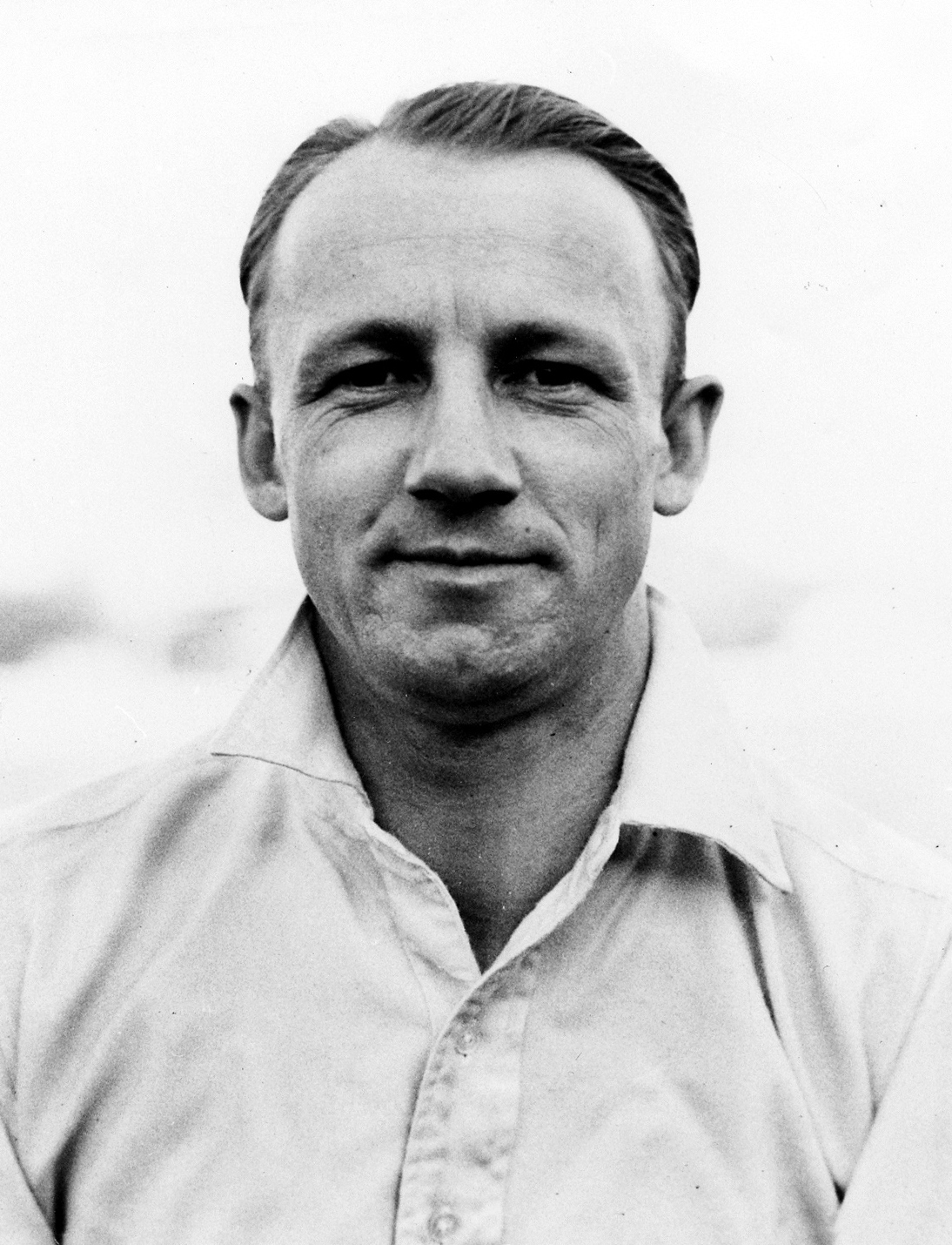
Don Bradman scored 29 centuries in Test Cricket.

Australian cricketer Sir Don Bradman, often recognized as the greatest batsman of all time, scored twenty-nine Test cricket centuries during his international career which lasted from 1928 to 1948. (Note: Bradman only played international Test cricket matches and not One Day Internationals and Twenty20 Internationals, which were not played at that time.) However, his cricketing career was interrupted from 1940 to 1946 due to the outbreak of World War II, followed by poor health. He assumed captaincy of the Australian side in 1946, and scored fourteen of his centuries as captain. Bradman holds the world record for the most double centuries scored by a single batsman, with twelve to his name. He was the first of four batsmen to have twice scored triple centuries, Brian Lara, Virender Sehwag and Chris Gayle. His total of nineteen centuries against England remains the world record for the highest number of centuries against a single team.

When he made 334—his first triple century—against England in the 1930 Ashes, Bradman scored 309 of those runs on 11 July 1930, which remains as the highest number of runs scored by a single batsman in one day. It was the highest individual Test score until Wally Hammond scored 336 in 1933. Len Hutton then surpassed Wally Hammond with 364 in 1938 which stood until 1958 when Garfield Sobers scored 365 not out. Later Brian Lara scored 400 in 2004. In the same series, Bradman went on to score a further century and two more double centuries, accumulating 974 runs in 7 innings—the most runs scored by one batsman in a single series. In 1937, Bradman, suffering from influenza and coming in at the seventh position, scored 270 to guide his team to victory against England. It was rated as the best Test innings of all time by the Wisden Cricketers' Almanack in 2001. It is also the highest score made by a number 7 batsman, while his 304 against England in 1934 was the highest score made by a number 5 batsman, until January 2012, when Michael Clarke made 329* against the touring Indians.

By the time of his retirement in 1948, Bradman had made twenty-nine centuries in eighty innings. These centuries, with which he had accumulated 5,393 of his 6,996 Test runs, were scored with a 36.25% ratio of centuries per innings played. This allowed him to maintain a career batting average of 99.94, while no other batsman has been able to reach 62 other than Harry Brook. (Note: Calculated from batsmen who have batted a minimum of twenty innings.) He would have retired with an average of 100 had he scored four more runs in his final innings.

== Key ==
Symbol	Meaning
*	Remained not out
♠	Captained the Australian side
Test	The number of the Test matches played in that series
Pos.	Position in the batting order
Inn.	The innings of the match
H/A	The venue was at home (Australia) or away.
Lost	The match was lost by Australia.
Won	The match was won by Australia.
Drawn	The match was drawn.

== Test cricket centuries ==
No.	Score	Against	Pos.	Inn.	Test	Venue	H/A	Date	Result
1	112	England	6	3	3/5	Melbourne Cricket Ground, Melbourne	Home	29 December 1928	Lost
2	123	England	5	2	5/5	Melbourne Cricket Ground, Melbourne	Home	8 March 1929	Won
3	131	England	3	4	1/5	Trent Bridge, Nottingham	Away	13 June 1930	Lost
4	254	England	3	2	2/5	Lord's Cricket Ground, London	Away	27 June 1930	Won
5	334	England	3	1	3/5	Headingley, Leeds	Away	11 July 1930	Drawn
6	232	England	3	2	5/5	The Oval, London	Away	16 August 1930	Won
7	223	West Indies	3	1	3/5	Brisbane Exhibition Ground, Brisbane	Home	16 January 1931	Won
8	152	West Indies	3	2	4/5	Melbourne Cricket Ground, Melbourne	Home	13 February 1931	Won
9	226	South Africa	3	1	1/5	The Gabba, Brisbane	Home	27 November 1931	Won
10	112	South Africa	4	2	2/5	Sydney Cricket Ground, Sydney	Home	18 December 1931	Won
11	167	South Africa	3	3	3/5	Melbourne Cricket Ground, Melbourne	Home	31 December 1931	Won
12	299*	South Africa	3	2	4/5	Adelaide Oval, Adelaide	Home	29 January 1932	Won
13	103*	England	4	3	2/5	Melbourne Cricket Ground, Melbourne	Home	30 December 1932	Won
14	304	England	5	2	4/5	Headingley, Leeds	Away	20 July 1934	Drawn
15	244	England	3	1	5/5	The Oval, London	Away	18 August 1934	Won
16	270♠	England	7	3	3/5	Melbourne Cricket Ground, Melbourne	Home	1 January 1937	Won
17	212♠	England	4	2	4/5	Adelaide Oval, Adelaide	Home	29 January 1937	Won
18	169♠	England	3	1	5/5	Melbourne Cricket Ground, Melbourne	Home	26 February 1937	Won
19	144♠	England	3	3	1/5	Trent Bridge, Nottingham	Away	14 June 1938	Draw
20	102♠	England	3	4	2/5	Lord's, London	Away	28 June 1938	Draw
21	103♠	England	4	2	4/5	Headingley, Leeds	Away	23 July 1938	Won
22	187♠	England	3	1	1/5	The Gabba, Brisbane	Home	29 November 1946	Won
23	234♠	England	6	2	2/5	Sydney Cricket Ground, Sydney	Home	13 December 1946	Won
24	185♠	India	3	1	1/5	The Gabba, Brisbane	Home	28 November 1947	Won
25	132♠	India	3	1	3/5	Melbourne Cricket Ground, Melbourne	Home	1 January 1948	Won
26	127*♠	India	6	3	3/5	Melbourne Cricket Ground, Melbourne	Home	3 January 1948	Won
27	201♠	India	3	1	4/5	Adelaide Oval, Adelaide	Home	23 January 1948	Won
28	138♠	England	3	2	1/5	Trent Bridge, Nottingham	Away	10 June 1948	Won
29	173*♠	England	3	4	4/5	Headingley, Leeds	Away	22 July 1948	Won
