= Godfrey Bradman =

English property developer (1936–2022)

- Born: 9 September 1936; London
- Died: December 25, 2022 (aged 86)
- Occupation: Property developer
- Spouse: Susan Bennett (m. 1975)
- Children: 5
- Parent(s): William Bradman; Anne (née Goldsweig)

Godfrey Michael Bradman (9 September 1936 – 25 December 2022) was a British property developer, accountant, and political campaigner. He was behind many significant developments in the City of London in the 1970s and 1980s. Bradman was partnered with Stuart Lipton.
