= Combo Waterhole =

Waterhole on the Diamantina River at Kynuna, Queensland, Australia

Coordinates: 21°36′06.22″S 142°03′59.56″E

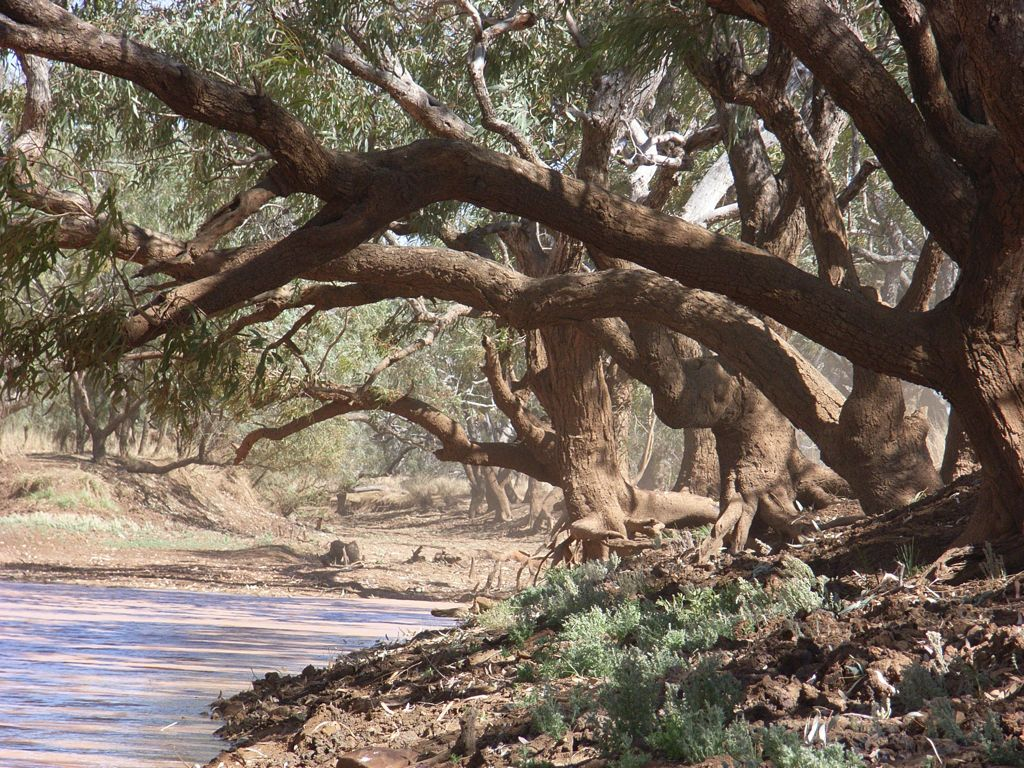
Combo Waterhole in a dust haze

Combo Waterhole is a waterhole (billabong) on the Diamantina River at Kynuna, Queensland, Australia. The song "Waltzing Matilda" is probably based on a real incident that happened there in the 1890s.

It is also noted for historic stone-pitched overshot weirs (causeways) built by Chinese labourers in 1883.

Combo Waterhole lies at the northern rim of a roughly circular zone measuring some 130 km across that has been identified by Geoscience Australia as a crustal anomaly. Proof is currently lacking as to the cause, but it is believed likely that the anomaly was caused by an asteroid strike that happened about 300 million years ago.
