= Don Bradman's batting technique =

Cricket technique

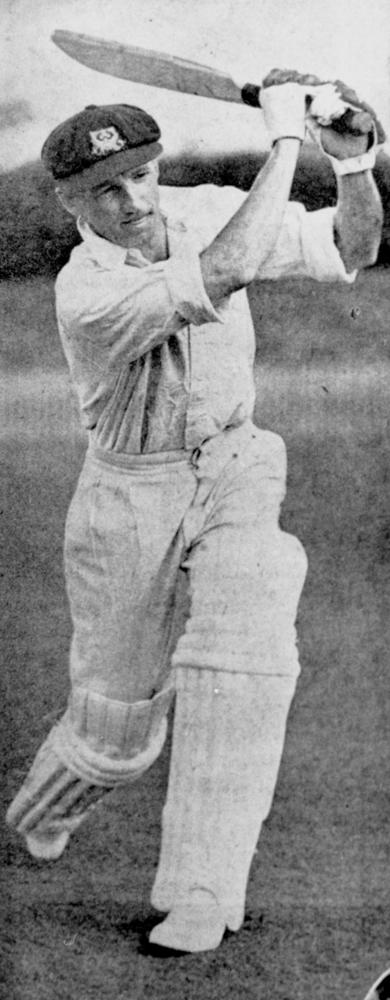
Don Bradman practises his drive, 1936.

Don Bradman's batting technique has been the subject of curiosity and analysis from students of cricket since the time he first came to prominence as a batsman in Australia during the 1920s. He dominated world cricket during a 20-year career, combining an unorthodox, self-developed batting technique with great levels of concentration. Bradman played no organised cricket at a junior level and received no coaching. When he began playing on turf pitches in 1926, some attempts were made to alter his style to conform to more orthodox methods, but he resisted and went on to unprecedented success as a run-maker. In recent years, efforts have been made to analyse his game by using biomechanical studies. In the Bradman Museum, it is revealed that Bradman used a golf ball and a cricket stump to practice batting.

== Early influences ==
At 170 cm (5 ft 7 in), Bradman was not a big man, but he was athletic and very fast on his feet. During his developing years, he played cricket on artificial pitches, made of concrete with coir matting stretched tautly over the top. His short stature shaped his early development, as he had to deal with the high bounce of the ball on this type of pitch. He found that the horizontal-bat shots (such as the hook, pull and cut) were the most productive for run scoring.

== Grip ==
Bradman devised a grip on the bat handle that would accommodate these strokes without compromising his ability to defend. In his biography of Bradman, "Johnny" Moyes, described his grip:

With most players, the [bat] handle runs across the palm of the [right, or bottom] hand and rests against the ball of the thumb. With Bradman, the hand is turned over so far that the handle presses against the ball of the thumb. As the grip tightens, the pressure becomes more intense. The left [top] hand is turned so that the wrist is behind the handle ... The combined result is that the bat slopes at an angle of about forty-five degrees from the ground, and so keeps the ball down, ensuring that in both the hook and the cut the blade is automatically turned over the ball.

== Stance and backswing ==
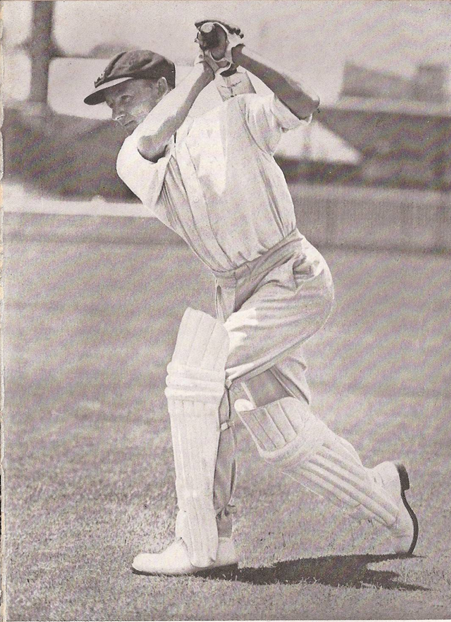
Don Bradman demonstrates his drive. Note the exaggerated follow-through of the bat so that its rests along his back, an indication of the power he put into his strokes.

Employing a wide, side-on stance at the crease, Bradman preferred to keep perfectly still as the bowler ran in. Placing the bat between his feet (rather than behind his rear foot) was another unorthodox feature of his game. All these elements combined to give his backswing a "crooked" look, in that the face of the bat pointed at the slips cordon, rather than going straight, as advised in the coaching manuals. This "crookedness" troubled his early critics, but Bradman resisted any major technical changes and it became a moot point after he broke the record for the most runs in a Test series during the 1930 tour of England.

In his 2003 book Bradman Revisited, Tony Shillinglaw utilised a biomechanical analysis of Bradman conducted by Liverpool John Moores University in England. Shillinglaw concluded that Bradman's initially perceived weakness was actually the key reason for his success – it created a "rotary" action in his swing of the bat that delivered extra power and ensured that he kept the ball along the ground. This was summarised as follows:

he levered the bat up by pushing down with the top hand, whilst using the bottom hand as a fulcrum. As it neared the top of the back-lift, Bradman manoeuvred the bat through a continuous arc and back towards the plane of the ball during the downswing in preparation for impact.

Additionally, his backswing (according to former Australian captain Greg Chappell) kept his hands in close to his body, leaving him perfectly balanced and able to change his stroke mid-swing, if he was initially deceived by the flight of the ball.

After striking the ball Bradman used an exaggerated follow through, so much so that his bat would be swung back over his shoulder and along his spine, like a golfer. Most batsmen ended their stroke with their bat held high in the air, Bradman's method allowed him to hit the ball with greater power.

== Footwork and guard ==
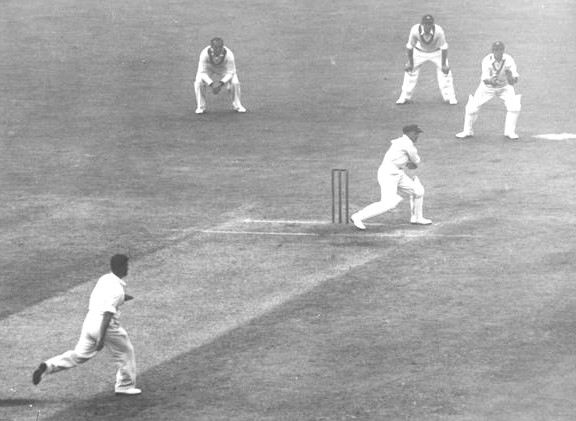
Bradman hooks English left-arm bowler Bill Voce during the 1936–37 series. Note the position of Bradman's left foot in relation to the stumps, an example of how he "used the crease" when batting.

Another telling factor was the decisiveness of Bradman's footwork. Bill O'Reilly noted that after experiencing turf wickets, Bradman significantly developed his back-foot play, which improved his defence and run scoring opportunities behind the wicket. Many photographs graphically demonstrate his ability to "use the crease" by either coming metres down the wicket to drive, or playing so far back that his feet ended up level with the stumps when playing the cut, hook or pull.

Bradman took a "two leg" guard at the crease, aligning his bat along an imaginary line directly between the middle and the leg stumps. Bradman found with this guard it was "easier to be sure that a ball travelling towards your pads is outside the leg stump"

== Evolution ==
Bradman's game evolved with experience, as these comments from Wisden regarding his play on consecutive tours of England demonstrate:

1930 – [in defence] he nearly always stepped back to meet the ball with a vertical bat. And this is where he had his limitations, for the tour proved that when he met a bowler either left-hand or right who could make the ball just go away he never seemed quite such a master as against off-break or straight fast bowling. A glorious driver, he hit the ball very hard, while his placing was almost invariably perfect. He scored most of his runs by driving ... only on rare occasions did he lift it.

1934 – It was noticeable that in many innings Bradman lifted the ball to a far greater extent than when he came here first ... it was obvious that in the course of four years he had improved his technique almost out of knowledge. He was much more interesting to look at because of the wider range of his scoring strokes. At his best he was probably harder to get out than ever ...

Bradman temporarily adapted his technique during the Bodyline series, deliberately moving around the crease in an attempt to hit the short deliveries into the vacant off-side. He had the capacity to switch between a defensive or attacking innings at will during the peak of his career in the mid-1930s. After the war, he again readjusted, batting within the physical limitations set by his ageing body, to become a steady "accumulator" of runs.

== Criticisms ==
However, he never truly mastered batting on sticky wickets. Although O'Reilly commented that, "wet wickets had shown me that no batsman was really worth a damn when the ball was rising at varying heights". "If there really is a blemish on his amazing record it is ... the absence of a significant innings on one of those 'sticky dogs' of old, when the ball was hissing and cavorting under a hot sun following heavy rain. This is not to say he couldn't have played one, but that on the big occasion, when the chance arose, he never did".
