= Controversies surrounding Don Bradman =

Australian cricket controversies

During his career, there were many controversies involving Australian cricketer Sir Donald Bradman (1908–2001).

== During his playing career ==
Bradman made a rapid rise from playing cricket for his hometown of Bowral in the southern highlands of New South Wales. Aged 19, he made a first-class debut for the NSW team in 1927–28 and first earned selection for the Australian Test side during the Ashes series of 1928–29. A score of 112 in the second innings of the third Test at Melbourne made him the youngest player to score a Test century. However, it was his performances during the 1930 Ashes series that first set him apart from his contemporaries. He broke myriad records (many of which still stand) in scoring 974 runs at an average of 139.

=== Aloofness from teammates ===
Bradman had a quiet, solitary off-field demeanour that first drew comment during his performances on the 1930 tour of England. Melbourne journalist Geoffrey Tebbutt, described Bradman's aloofness from his teammates in his subsequent book about the tour. He described Bradman's usual routine after play – Bradman would retire to his hotel room, write and listen to a phonograph. After scoring a world record of 334 runs in the Test match at Leeds, Bradman was given a cheque for £1000 – £75,000 today – by an admiring expatriate Australian businessman. Tebbutt wrote that Bradman had not even offered to buy his teammates a round of drinks, let alone share the money.

His exploits in England made him a national hero in Australia, and he received an overwhelming reception when he returned home. Bradman left his teammates on board their ship at Fremantle to attend welcoming functions in Adelaide, Melbourne, Goulburn, his hometown Bowral and Sydney, all organised by his employers. In Sydney, he received a brand new custom-built Chevrolet. The receptions and the level of adulation from the media and the public "embarrassed" him.

Naturally, this type of focus on an individual in a team game had ramifications. Adding to the criticism offered by Tebbutt, the Australian vice-captain Vic Richardson commented that, "we could have played any team without Bradman, but we could not have played the blind school without [leg spin bowler] Clarrie Grimmett".

=== Disputes with administrators ===
Bradman spent much of his solitary time on the tour writing as he had sold the rights to a book. Serialised in London's The Star during August, Don Bradman's Book was published in November 1930. It was a modest work of 50,000 words with a few pages of tips as an appendix. The Board of Control ruled that the serialised extracts of his book were a technical breach of his tour contract, which banned players from writing about the game. The dispute was widely covered by the press, most of which was supportive of Bradman. However, he was fined £50 for the misdemeanour on 29 December 1930.

=== Proposal to play professional cricket ===
In the spring of 1931, Bradman seriously contemplated playing professional cricket in England with the Lancashire League club Accrington. The media in England and Australia hotly debated the consequences of a move that would end Bradman's Test career. Bradman was advised by the Board of Control that if he played cricket in England in 1932, it would be another breach of his 1930 tour contract and therefore he would not be considered for Test selection if he went ahead with the deal. Public opinion divided: Australian cricket could not afford to lose him and some thought he was selling his birthright, but at the height of the Depression, working-class people empathised with Bradman. The opportunity to earn over £1000 per annum was very tempting to a young man without a profession.

Eventually, a consortium of three Sydney businesses offered an alternative. They devised a two-year contract whereby Bradman would write for Associated Newspapers, broadcast regularly on Radio 2UE and promote the menswear retailing chain FJ Palmer and Son. The contract was substantially less than the money on offer from Accrington, and it would increase Bradman's dependence on his public profile, thus making it more difficult to lead the private life that he desired. In addition, writing for the newspapers would again bring him into conflict with the administrators.

The Australian Board of Control refused permission for him to write about the 1932–33 series for the press, claiming that only "professional" journalists (such as Jack Fingleton) were entitled to do so under the Board's rules. This led to open confrontation: Bradman was adamant that he would honour his writing contract. If necessary, he would write and not play. The impasse resolved when the editorial chief of Associated Newspapers, RC Packer (grandfather of Kerry Packer) agreed to release him from the obligation.

=== Bodyline ===
Bradman's prolific run-making tested the minds of his opposition. The conundrum bedevilled English minds during preparations for their next tour of Australia. London's News Chronicle summed up the prevailing sentiment:

As long as Australia has Bradman she will be invincible...To keep alive the competitive spirit, the authorities might take a hint from billiards. It is almost time to request a legal limit on the number of runs Bradman should be allowed to make.

Ex-England player Percy Fender wrote, "something new will have to be introduced to curb Bradman ... [something] along the lines of theory". Fender's successor as captain of Surrey was the amateur batsman Douglas Jardine, who had shared Fender's tribulations in finding a way to subdue Bradman. "Plum" Warner was an influential voice within the Marylebone Cricket Club (MCC), the club that administered English cricket at the time. Warner opined that, "England must evolve a new type of bowler and develop fresh ideas and strange tactics to curb his almost uncanny skill". Warner orchestrated the appointment of Jardine as England captain in 1931, with a view to him leading the tour to Australia. Warner accompanied the team as manager.

Encouraged by the perception that Bradman struggled against bouncers on a lively pitch during his 232 at The Oval, Jardine began gathering information from players such as Frank Foster who employed "leg theory" in English cricket. Jardine's innovation was to combine traditional leg theory with short-pitched bowling that bounced more alarmingly on harder Australian pitches. He settled on the Notts fast bowlers Harold Larwood and Bill Voce as the spearheads for his tactics during a meeting with the duo's county captain, Arthur Carr. In support, the England selectors chose another three pacemen for the squad. The unusually high number of fast bowlers caused a lot of comment in both countries and Bradman himself suspected a virulent intent.

Bradman had several problems to deal with at this time, he was suffering random bouts of illness from an undiagnosed malaise, while the dispute over his newspaper contract was being resolved. He faced the English in three first-class games before the Tests, and in six innings averaged just 17.16. Jardine decided to trial their new tactics in only one game, a fixture against an Australian XI at Melbourne. In this match, Bradman faced the leg theory and looked uncomfortable in losing his wicket twice to Larwood. Later, Bradman sought out some local administrators and warned of trouble brewing if the leg theory continued.

Ill-health forced Bradman to withdraw from the first Test at Sydney, and a rumour circulated that he had suffered a nervous breakdown. In his absence, England persisted with bowling Bodyline (as it was now dubbed) and won an ill-tempered match despite a heroic century from Stan McCabe.

Included as a replacement for Alan Kippax, Bradman walked to the crease on the first day of the second Test at the MCG with the score at 2/67. A world record crowd of 63,993 provided a standing ovation that delayed play for several minutes. Anticipating the bouncer first ball, Bradman moved across to play the hook shot, but the ball failed to rise and he dragged it onto his stumps, making his initial first-ball duck in a Test. The crowd fell into stunned silence as he walked off.

Australia took a first-innings lead in the match, and another record crowd on turned out on 2 January 1933 to watch Bradman hit a counter-attacking second innings century. His unbeaten 103 (from 146 balls) in a team total of 191 helped set England a target of 251 to win. Bill O'Reilly and Bert Ironmonger bowled Australia to a series-levelling victory amid hopes that Bodyline was beaten.

The third Test at Adelaide Oval proved pivotal. Angry crowd scenes occurred after the Australian skipper Bill Woodfull and wicketkeeper Bert Oldfield were hit by bouncers. An apologetic Plum Warner entered the Australian dressing room and was rebuked by Woodfull. The Board of Control, in a cable to the MCC, repeated the allegation of poor sportsmanship directed at Warner by Woodfull. Furious that a private conversation in the dressing room made the newspapers, Warner blamed Jack Fingleton for what he considered to be a breach of ethics. In turn, Fingleton believed Bradman responsible, a claim Bradman always denied. This incident led to a major falling-out between the two. Fingleton was dropped after scoring a pair in the match and subsequently omitted from the 1934 tour of England. He blamed Bradman for these setbacks.

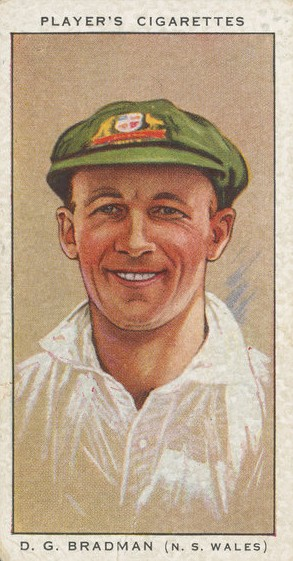
Bradman during his playing days

England continued with Bodyline despite Australian protests, and with the support of the MCC. The tourists won the last three Tests convincingly and regained the Ashes. Bradman caused controversy with his own tactics. Always seeking to score, he often backed away and hit the ball into the vacant half of the outfield with unorthodox shots reminiscent of tennis or golf. This brought him 396 runs (at 56.57) for the series and plaudits for seeking an answer to playing Bodyline. However, others thought it proved the theory that he did not handle the short ball very well. Jack Fingleton was in no doubt that Bradman's game altered irrevocably as a consequence, writing:

Bodyline was specially prepared, nurtured for and expended on him and, in consequence, his technique underwent a change quicker than might have been the case with the passage of time. Bodyline plucked something vibrant from his art.

=== Captaincy problems ===
There was off-field intrigue in Australian cricket during 1935. Australia, scheduled to make its first full tour of South Africa the following summer, needed to replace the retired Bill Woodfull as captain. The Board of Control wanted Bradman to lead the team. However, on 8 August 1935, the Board announced that Bradman was unfit and that he was withdrawing from the squad; yet he led the South Australia team in a full programme of matches in the absence of the Australian players. Vic Richardson, who Bradman replaced as SA captain, was made Test captain, even though his form did not warrant a place in the Australian team.

Chris Harte has thoroughly researched the files of the South Australian Cricket Association (SACA), and written histories of both the SACA and Australian cricket. His analysis of the situation is that an (unspecified) prior commercial agreement forced Bradman to remain in Australia. Moreover, Harte attributes an ulterior motive to the SACA's recruitment of Bradman. The issue of the off-field behaviour of Vic Richardson, and some other regular SA players, had festered over a number of years and the SACA was desperate for a solution. Therefore, they wanted Bradman to provide new leadership and improve discipline, as well as score runs. Bradman became a committeeman of the SACA, and a selector of the SA and Australian teams. He took his adopted state to victory in the Sheffield Shield for the first time in ten years and set a string of SA records along the way.

In South Africa, the Australia team had a very successful tour and senior players such as Bill O'Reilly were pointed in their comments about the enjoyment of playing under Richardson's captaincy. A clique of players who were openly hostile toward Bradman formed during the tour. For some, the prospect of playing under Bradman was daunting, as was the knowledge that he would be sitting in judgment of their abilities in his role as a selector.

To start the new season, the Test side played a rest of Australia team captained by Bradman at Sydney in early October 1936. The Test XI suffered a big defeat, due to Bradman's 212 and a bag of twelve wickets by leg-spinner Frank Ward. Rather undiplomatically, Bradman let the members of the Test team know that despite their recent success, they were not quite as good as they believed themselves to be.

== During his administrative career ==
Bradman's administrative career was much longer than his playing career, and proved just as influential. In addition to acting as South Australia's delegate to the Board of Control from 1945 to 1980, he was a committeeman of the SA Cricket Association (SACA) between 1935 and 1986. It is estimated that Bradman attended 1713 SACA meetings during this half century of service. He was also a selector for the Test team between 1936 and 1971. He had two periods as chairman of the Board of Control, between 1960–1963 and 1969–1972.

=== Throwing ===
In the early 1960s, Bradman dealt with the growing prevalence of illegal bowling actions in the game, liaising with the English authorities to help solve a problem that Bradman called "the most complex I have known in cricket, because it is not a matter of fact but of opinion."

Bradman was accused of using Australian paceman Ian Meckiff as a "sacrificial goat", by selecting him to play Tests when it was believed that he privately felt that Meckiff had an illegal action, so that Meckiff would be no-balled, so that it would show that Australia was serious about stamping out throwing. Meckiff was duly called by Colin Egar in December 1964, ending his career. Many cricket writers assailed Bradman and the other selectors for sending Meckiff out to be "executed".

Bradman had hosted a dinner in January 1963 for four visiting state captains at his Adelaide home. There Bradman showed frame-by-frame film of Meckiff and other suspect Australian bowlers, which purported to show incriminating evidence against their bowling actions.

=== South African tour 1971–72 ===
The major controversy of the second stint was a proposed tour of Australia by South Africa in 1971–72. On Bradman's recommendation, the series was cancelled.

=== World Series Cricket ===
Bradman played an important role during the World Series Cricket (WSC) schism of the late 1970s. He was no fan of the concept but he dealt with WSC in a more pragmatic manner than other members of the ACB. Bradman realised the weaknesses inherent in Australian cricket and favoured compromise very early in the dispute. In 1977, Richie Benaud, hired as a consultant and commentator for WSC, prepared a document for WSC on the inner workings of official cricket, and described Bradman as "a brilliant administrator and businessman" and warned that he was not to be underestimated.

During the first season of peace between the two organisations (1979–80), Bradman felt that Packer's men, now effectively running the game, were easing him out. Former WSC Australian captain Ian Chappell was playing his last season. After serving a three-week suspension for misbehaviour, Chappell was again reported by an umpire for poor on-field conduct in his first match back. Bradman was asked to head a three-man disciplinary hearing for Chappell, who arrived at the proceedings drinking a beer. Chris Harte quotes Bradman on what transpired:

It was a set-up. The two other Board members cried off with feeble excuses and I had to sit alone in judgment. I heard the case; found Chappell guilty as charged, and suspended him forthwith for a period of six weeks. I sent my report to the Board who did not back me up. Chappell's sentence was suspended. I had no other course of action than to see the season through and not re-nominate again.

Chappell was always clear about his thoughts on the matter. Bradman's obstinacy, he believed, was responsible for much of the ill-will that brought about the Packer breakaway: "Once you'd put your case he countered with the perennial, 'No son, we can't do that,' delivered in his distinctive high-pitched tone, as was the harangue that followed and then the meeting was over."

Shortly after the hearing, Chappell was recalled to the Australian team for the first time in four years. In recent times, he has commented that Bradman should have held more empathy with the players' quest for better pay, bearing in mind that Bradman had fought with the Board in the early 1930s over similar issues. However, while Chappell has suggested that Bradman was parsimonious and treated the ACB's money as his own, Gideon Haigh considers that Bradman was merely applying the standards of his own generation without taking into account that society (and sports) has changed:

Bradman's playing philosophy – that cricket should not be a career, and that those good enough could profit from other avenues – also seems to have borne on his approach to administration. Biographers have disserved Bradman in glossing over his years in officialdom. His strength and scruples over more than three decades were exemplary; the foremost master of the game became its staunchest servant. But he largely missed the secular shift toward the professionalisation of sport in the late '60s and early '70s, which finally found expression in Kerry Packer's World Series Cricket...Discussing Packer, Bradman told biographer Charles Williams in January 1995 he '"accepted that cricket had to become professional"
