= Our Don Bradman =

"Our Don Bradman" is a 1930 song by Jack O'Hagan about the legendary Australian cricketer Donald Bradman. It was written just before the 1930 Ashes Test Series between England and Australia, which was held in England that year.

== Content ==
The song celebrates Donald Bradman as someone who "has won Australia's very highest praise". It lists his achievements and talents, and declares him the person whom "all Australia raves about", more than "Amy Johnson or little Mickey Mouse". The song also mentions other contemporary Australian cricketers, namely Bill Woodfull, Clarrie Grimmett, Bill Ponsford, Alan Kippax "and the rest", but even though the singer acknowledges that they have "gallantly and nobly done their share", Bradman still "tops them all". The lines "How that Mister Lion, poor fish / must just sit and wish and wish / that our Don had never come across the foam" refer to the lion, one of the symbols of English cricket. The lyrics also mention the British cricketers Maurice Tate and Harold Larwood.

== Lyrics ==
Who is it that all Australia raves about?
Who has won our very highest praise?
Now it isn't Amy Johnson or little Mickey Mouse?
No! It's just a country lad who's bringing down the house.
And he's

Chorus:
Our Don Bradman,
And I ask you is he any good?
Our Don Bradman,
As a batsman he can sure lay on the wood:
For when he goes in to bat
He knocks ev'ry record flat,
For there isn't anything he cannot do,
Our Don Bradman,
Every Aussie "dips his lid" to you.

Woodfull, Grimmett, Ponsford, Kippax, and the rest
Proved that they were equal to the best;
Now gallantly and nobly we know they've done their share,
But there's one who tops them — a real devil-may-care,
And he's

Our Don Bradman.
Now I ask you is he any good?
Our Don Bradman,
As a batsman he is certainly "plum pud".
Tate and Larwood meet their fate,
For it's always "shut the gate"
When the boy from Bowral hits four after four.
Our Don Bradman
Always manages to top the score.

How that Mister Lion, poor fish, must sit and wish and wish
That our Don had never come across the foam,
Our Don Bradman,
What a welcome waits for you back home,
Tho' those cricketers, now gone — Trumper, Spofforth, and so on —
Wrote their name for ever in the hall of fame,
Our Don Bradman
Is the greatest ever played the game.
(Chorus)

== Public reception ==
The song was recorded with a vocal by Art Leonard and released in July 1930 by Regal. Some of O'Hagan's verses were omitted. On the B-side was another cricket song, "Our Eleven", written by Jack Lumsdaine. The sheet music was released at the same time, just as Bradman scored a triple-century in a Test match in England, and sold 40,000 copies in a few days. A piano roll was also released that month, recorded by Laurel Pardey.

The song quickly became popular, and within a few weeks it was being performed at community concerts around Australia. When Bradman returned to his home town of Bowral in November 1930 after the triumphant tour of England, the band at the civic reception played "Our Don Bradman".

The song was voted number one by teenage listeners of radio station 2UW in Sydney in 1967 after it was played as a joke for a listener who had sent it in.
