= Tangorin =

- Town
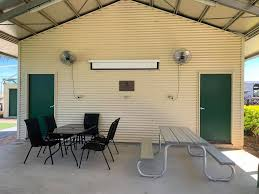
- Cameron Downs State School, eating area with fans to chase the flies away, 2025

- Interactive map of Tangorin
- Coordinates: 21.7608°S 144.2205°E
- Country: Australia
- State: Queensland
- LGA: Shire of Flinders
- Location: 26.9 km (16.7 mi) S of Hughenden; 270 km (170 mi) WSW of Charters Towers; 406 km (252 mi) WSW of Townsville; 1,410 km (880 mi) NW of Brisbane

Government
  - State electorate: Traeger
  - Federal division: Kennedy

Area
  - Total: 5,705.6 km^{2} (2,202.9 sq mi)

Population
  - Total: 47 (2021 census)
  - Density: 0.00824/km^{2} (0.02134/sq mi)
- Time zone: UTC+10:00 (AEST)
- Postcode: 4821
Localities around Tangorin
Stamford	Hughenden	Prairie
Stamford	Tangorin	Prairie
Corfield	Corfield	Prairie

Tangorin is a rural town and locality in the Flinders Shire, Queensland, Australia. In the 2021 census, the locality of Tangorin had a population of 47 people.

== Indigenous language ==
Jirandali (also known as Yirandali, Warungu, Yirandhali) is an Australian Aboriginal language of North-West Queensland, particularly the Hughenden area. The language region includes the local government area of the Shire of Flinders, including Dutton River, Flinders River, Mount Sturgeon, Caledonia, Richmond, Corfield, Winton, Torrens, Tower Hill, Landsborough Creek, Lammermoor Station, Hughenden, and Tangorin.

== History ==
Tangorin Provisional School opened in 1902 and closed in 1905, after several temporary closures.

Cameron Downs State School opened on 23 January 1967.

== Demographics ==
In the 2016 census, the locality of Tangorin had a population of 58 people.

In the 2021 census, the locality of Tangorin had a population of 47 people.

== Education ==
Cameron Downs State School is a government primary (Early Childhood-6) school for boys and girls on Cameron Downs School Road off Hughenden-Muttaburra Road (21.3745°S 144.2788°E). In 2018, the school had an enrolment of 8 students with 2 teachers and 2 non-teaching staff.

Hughenden State School is a government primary and secondary school (to Year 12) in neighbouring Hughenden to the north.

However, some parts of Tangorin would be too distant to attend one or both of these schools. The alternatives are distance education and boarding school.
