= Porcupine, Queensland =

Porcupine
- Suburb
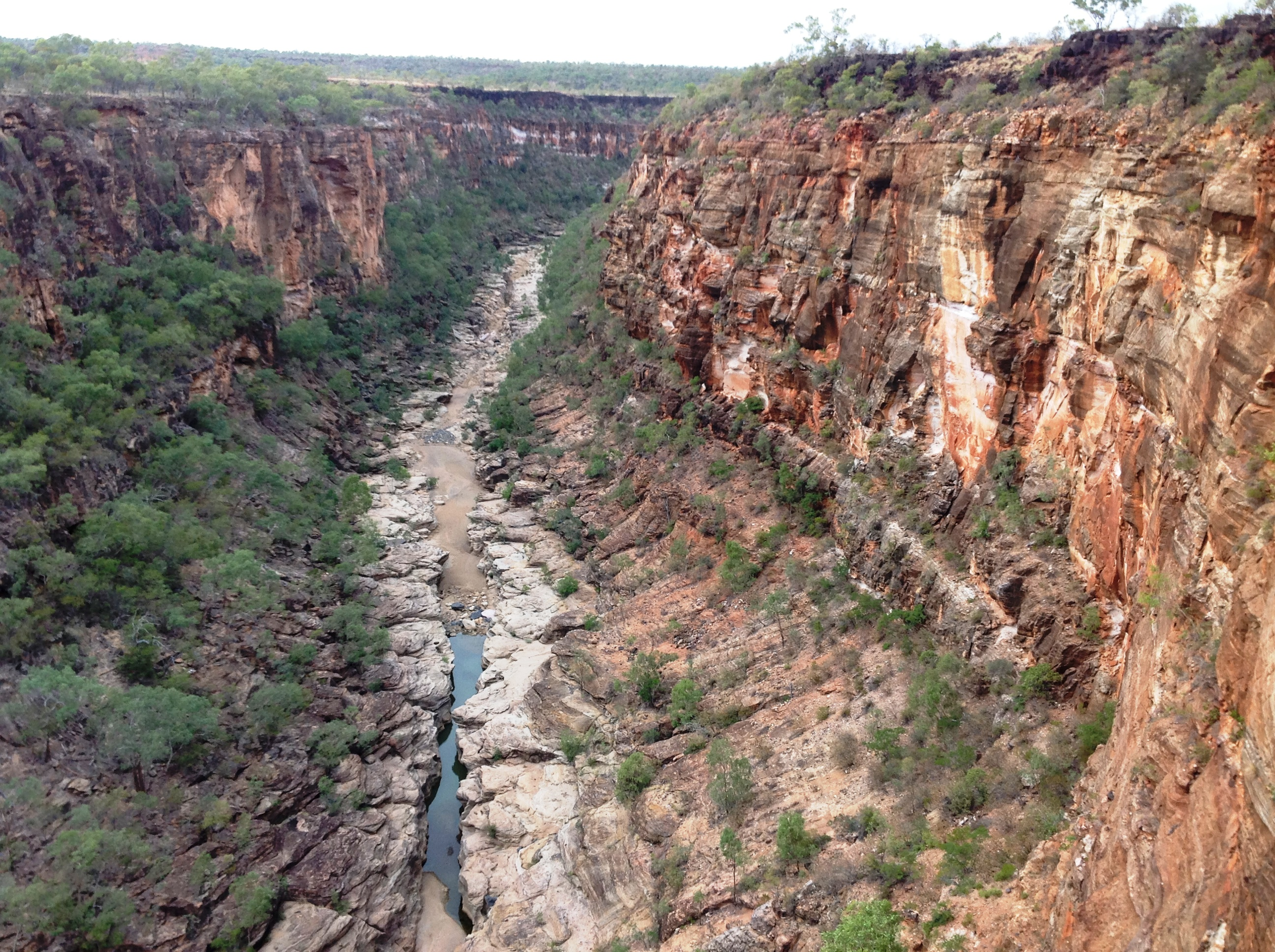
- Porcupine Creek flowing through Porcupine Gorge, 2015

- Interactive map of Porcupine
- Coordinates: 20.0891°S 144.335°E
- Country: Australia
- State: Queensland
- LGA: Shire of Flinders
- Location: 108 km (67 mi) NNE of Hughenden; 452 km (281 mi) WSW of Townsville; 1,538 km (956 mi) NNW of Brisbane

Government
  - State electorate: Traeger
  - Federal division: Kennedy

Area
  - Total: 8,318.6 km^{2} (3,211.8 sq mi)

Population
  - Total: 39 (2021 census)
  - Density: 0.00469/km^{2} (0.01214/sq mi)
- Time zone: UTC+10:00 (AEST)
- Postcode: 4821
Suburbs around Porcupine
Woolgar	Gilberton; Lyndhurst	Basalt
Dutton River	Porcupine	Pentland
Hughenden	Prairie	Torrens Creek

Porcupine is an outback locality in the Shire of Flinders, Queensland, Australia. In the 2021 census, Porcupine had a population of 39 people.

== Geography ==
The drainage divide created by the Great Dividing Range runs from north to south near the eastern boundary of the locality. As a consequence, the terrain in the locality is mountainous with the following named peaks (from north to south):

- Bombarri Hill (19.5902°S 144.3003°E) 960 metres (3,150 ft) above sea level
- Castle Hill (19.6804°S 144.2307°E) 900 metres (3,000 ft)
- Mount King (20.0175°S 144.4809°E) 900 metres (3,000 ft)
- Mount Mistake (20.0578°S 144.4421°E) 910 metres (2,990 ft)
- Mount Dick (20.1085°S 144.5813°E) 900 metres (3,000 ft)
- Mount Cracknell (20.1582°S 144.6815°E) 886 metres (2,907 ft)
- Mount Bradshaw (20.1632°S 144.2928°E) 850 metres (2,790 ft)
- Mount James (20.2156°S 144.3580°E) 968 metres (3,176 ft)
- Mount Emu (20.2283°S 144.3759°E) 976 metres (3,202 ft)
- Mount Pleasant (20.2330°S 144.6055°E) 814 metres (2,671 ft)
- Mount Oxley (20.2338°S 144.8215°E) 820 metres (2,690 ft)
- Mount Sturgeon (20.2509°S 144.4688°E) 795 metres (2,608 ft)
- Bald Hill (20.2853°S 144.1038°E) 689 metres (2,260 ft)
- Mount Pleasant (second mountain of that name, 20.3388°S 144.2021°E) 762 metres (2,500 ft)
- Mount Wongalee (20.6339°S 144.4111°E) 515 metres (1,690 ft)
- Mount Canterbury (20.6631°S 144.3158°E) 466 metres (1,529 ft)

Numerous creeks rise in this area flowing into valleys west towards inland Queensland where they eventually become tributaries of the Flinders River which flows through the Gulf Country to the Gulf of Carpentaria. In contrast, the South Gregory River rises to the east of the divide and flows eventually into the Burdekin River which enters the Coral Sea at Upstart Bay, east of Ayr.

The Kennedy Developmental Road enters the locality from north (Lyndhurst) and exits to south (Hughenden / Prairie).

Some small areas of the locality are part of a number of national parks including Porcupine Gorge National Park (which protects the Porcupine Gorge created by Porcupine Creek, entirely within the southern part of the locality), White Mountains National Park (extending south-east into Torrens Creek) and Blackbraes National Park (extending north into Lyndhurst).

Apart from the protected areas, the land use is grazing on native vegetation.

== History ==
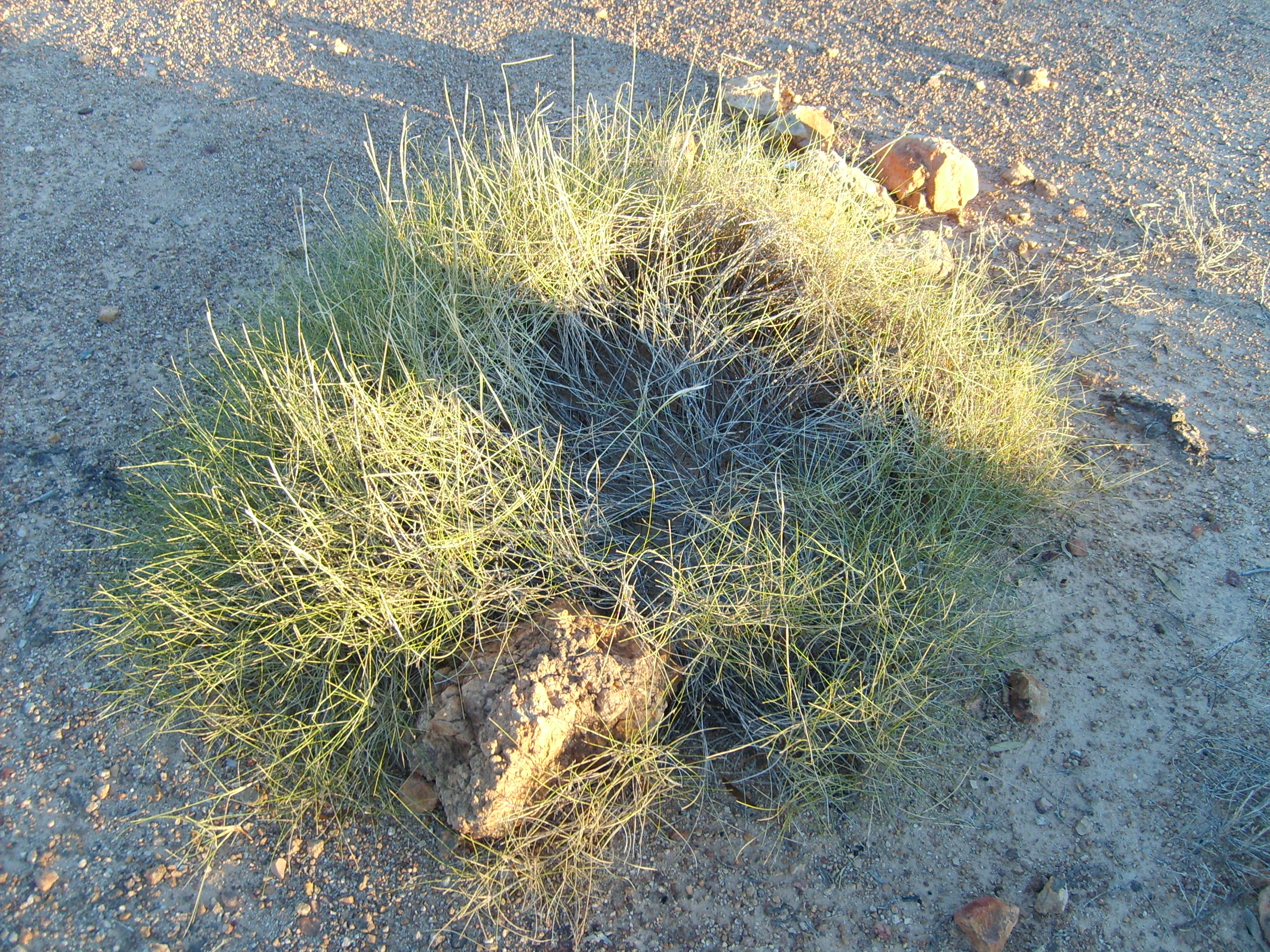
Porcupine grass, a species of Triodia

The locality was named and bounded on 23 February 2001. The name is believed to derive from the appearance of the spiky leaves of the spinifex bushes in the area. In particular the Triodia scariosa is commonly known in Australia as "porcupine grass".

== Demographics ==
In the 2016 census, Porcupine had a population of 49 people.

In the 2021 census, Porcupine had a population of 39 people.

== Education ==
There are no schools in Porcupine. The nearest government school is Hughenden State School (Prep–12) in neighbouring Hughenden to the south-west. However, this school would only be within range of a daily commute for the southern part of Porcupine. Options for students living further north in Porcupine would be distance education and boarding school.

== Attractions ==
Within the Porcupine Gorge National Park, there are two lookouts:

- Pyramid Rock Lookout (20.3468°S 144.4619°E) which is accessed via a 400-metre (1,300 ft) walk
- Porcupine Gorge Lookout (20.4098°S 144.4370°E) which is accessed via a 200-metre (660 ft) walk which is wheelchair-accessible with assistance.
