= Prubi railway station =

Railway station in Queensland, Australia

Coordinates: 22°05′02″S 143°07′53″E

Prubi is a railway station on the Hughenden-Winton railway line in the locality of Corfield in the Shire of Winton, Queensland, Australia. It is to the immediate east of the Kennedy Developmental Road.

== History ==
The name Prubi means "plains".
