= Gulf Country =

Queensland region

Coordinates: 17°52′22.33″S 140°10′28.36″E

- Region
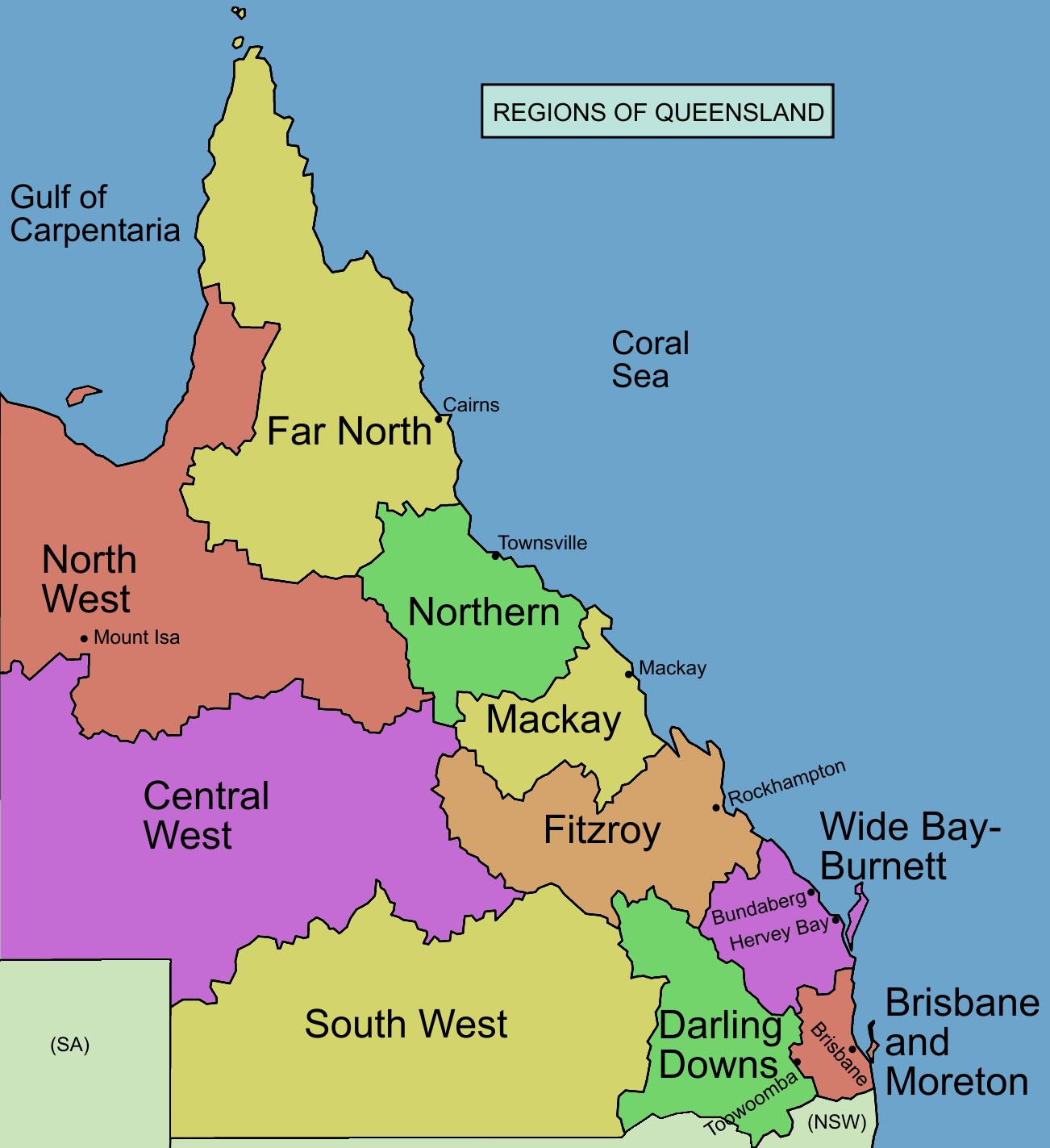
- North West Queensland is also referred to as the Gulf Country
- Country: Australia
- State: Queensland
- LGA: Burke, Carpentaria, Cloncurry, Croydon, Flinders, McKinlay, Mount Isa, Richmond

Government
  - State electorate: Traeger, Cook
  - Federal division: Kennedy

Area
  - Total: 186,000 km^{2} (72,000 sq mi)

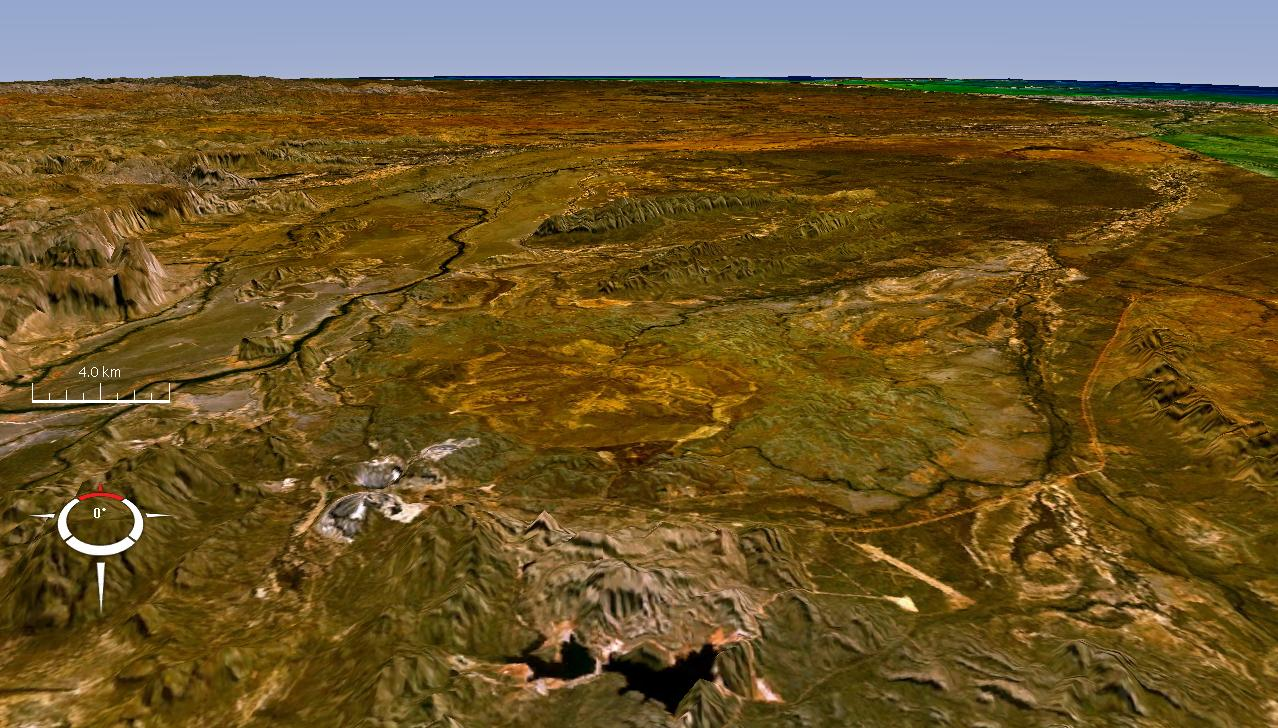
Terrain around Lawn Hill crater

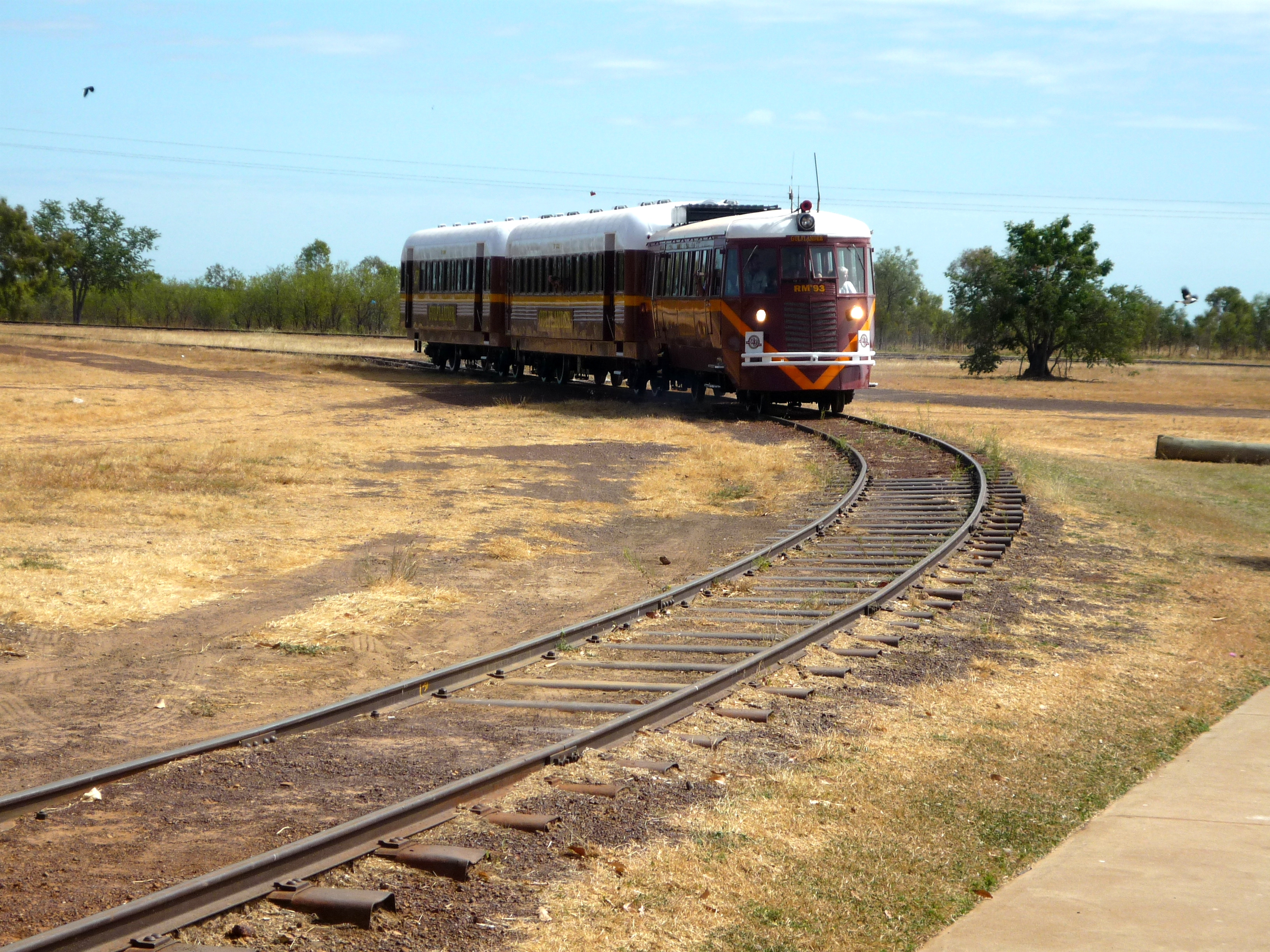
The Gulflander at Normanton, 2011

The Gulf Country or North West Queensland is the region of woodland and savanna grassland surrounding the Gulf of Carpentaria in north western Queensland and eastern Northern Territory on the north coast of Australia. The region is also called the Gulf Savannah. The Gulf Country is crossed by the Savannah Way highway.

The flat, savannah land has a dry season and a monsoon, containing the largest areas of native grassland in Australia. It is used for raising cattle and mining. It contains large reserves of zinc, lead and silver. The area is home to a number of endangered species and is crossed by a number of major rivers. The first known European explorer of the region was Willem Janszoon.

== Location and description ==
The Gulf Country is a block of dry savanna between the wetter areas of Arnhem Land and the Top End of the Northern territory to the west and the Cape York Peninsula of Far North Queensland to the east, while to the south and east lie upland plains of Mitchell grasses and the Einasleigh Uplands. The Northern Territory side of the area is the Gulf Fall area of sandstone slopes and gorges draining the interior uplands into the gulf. The main land uses in the Gulf Country are beef cattle and mining.

The region covers an area of 186,000 km^{2} (72,000 sq mi). The landscape is generally flat and low-lying tropical savannah cut through with rivers that carry the monsoon rains to the gulf and feed coastal mudflats and patches of rainforest. The Sir Edward Pellew Group of Islands and the Wellesley Islands lie off the gulf coast.

The main settlements in the region include the city of Mount Isa and the towns of Doomadgee, Cloncurry, Camooweal, Kowanyama, Karumba, Normanton and Burketown. The port at Karumba is one of Australia's main live cattle exporting ports. The oldest building in the region is the Burketown Hotel.

== Climate ==
The climate is hot with a dry season and a monsoon. The dry season lasts from about April until November and is characterized by very dry southeast to east winds, generated by migratory winter high pressure systems to the south. The wet season lasts from December to March and is characterised by humid northerly monsoonal airflows. This wet season can be very erratic: at Burketown, which is typical of the region, the rainfall of various wet seasons has ranged from as little as 150 millimetres (5.9 in) to as much as 2,000 millimetres (79 in). Overall rainfall is low (from 750 mm on the coast to 500 mm inland) but if the wet season is at all strong, low-lying areas are flooded and even the few sealed roads are cut. The Gulf is also a breeding ground for cyclones during the period between November and April.

In September and October the Morning Glory Cloud appears in the Southern Gulf. The best vantage point to see this phenomenon is in the Burketown area shortly after dawn.

== History ==
Jirandali (also known as Yirandali, Warungu, and Yirandhali) is an Australian Aboriginal language of the Gulf Country, particularly the Hughenden area. The language region includes the local government area of the Shire of Flinders, including Dutton River, Flinders River, Mount Sturgeon, Caledonia, Richmond, Corfield, Winton, Torrens, Tower Hill, Landsborough Creek, Lammermoor Station, Hughenden, and Tangorin.

Waanyi (also known as Wanyi, Wanyee, Wanee, Waangyee, Wonyee, Garawa, and Wanji) is an Australian Aboriginal language of the Gulf Country. The language region includes the western parts of Lawn Hill Creek and Nicholson River, from about the boundary between the Northern Territory and Queensland, westwards towards Alexandria station, Doomadgee, and Nicholson River. It includes the local government area of the Aboriginal Shire of Doomadgee.

Wanamarra (also known as Maykulan and Wunumura is an Australian Aboriginal language in North West Queensland. The language region includes areas within the Shire of McKinlay, Shire of Cloncurry and Shire of Richmond, including the Flinders River area, and the towns of Kynuna and Richmond.

Yukulta (also known as Ganggalida) is an Australian Aboriginal language of the Gulf Country. The Yukulta language region includes the local government areas of the Aboriginal Shire of Doomadgee and Shire of Mornington.

The first known European explorer to visit the region was the Dutch Willem Janszoon (whose name is also written as Jansz) in his 1605–6 voyage. His fellow countryman Jan Carstenszoon (or Carstensz) visited in 1623 and named the gulf in honour of Pieter de Carpentier, at that time the Governor-General of the Dutch East Indies. Abel Tasman also explored the coast in 1644. The region was later explored and charted by Matthew Flinders in 1802 and 1803.

The first overland explorer in the area was the Prussian Ludwig Leichhardt who traversed the area in 1844 and 1845. He was followed by Augustus Gregory of the North Australian Expedition in 1856, and then Burke and Wills in 1861. John McKinlay, Frederick Walker and William Landsborough lead separate search parties into the Gulf looking for Burke and Wills in 1861 and 1862.

As pastoralists settled in the area there were significant clashes with local Aboriginal populations. Historian Tony Roberts has described the nature of massacres and violent encounters in the Gulf Country (part of the Australian frontier wars) in his book titled Frontier Justice: A History of the Gulf Country to 1900 (2005). His research showed that senior colonial politicians, including former South Australian colonial premiers Sir John Colton and Sir John Downer, along with South Australian police, "masterminded, condoned or concealed... atrocities" in the Gulf Country, which led to the deaths of at least 600 Aboriginal people. The book won the State Records – John and Patricia Ward History Prize in the New South Wales Premier's History Awards; the Australian Historical Association's WK Hancock Prize; and the Chief Minister's Northern Territory Book History Award.

The 1964 Mount Isa Mines Strike was a prolonged strike between miners and management at Mount Isa Mines.

== Mining ==
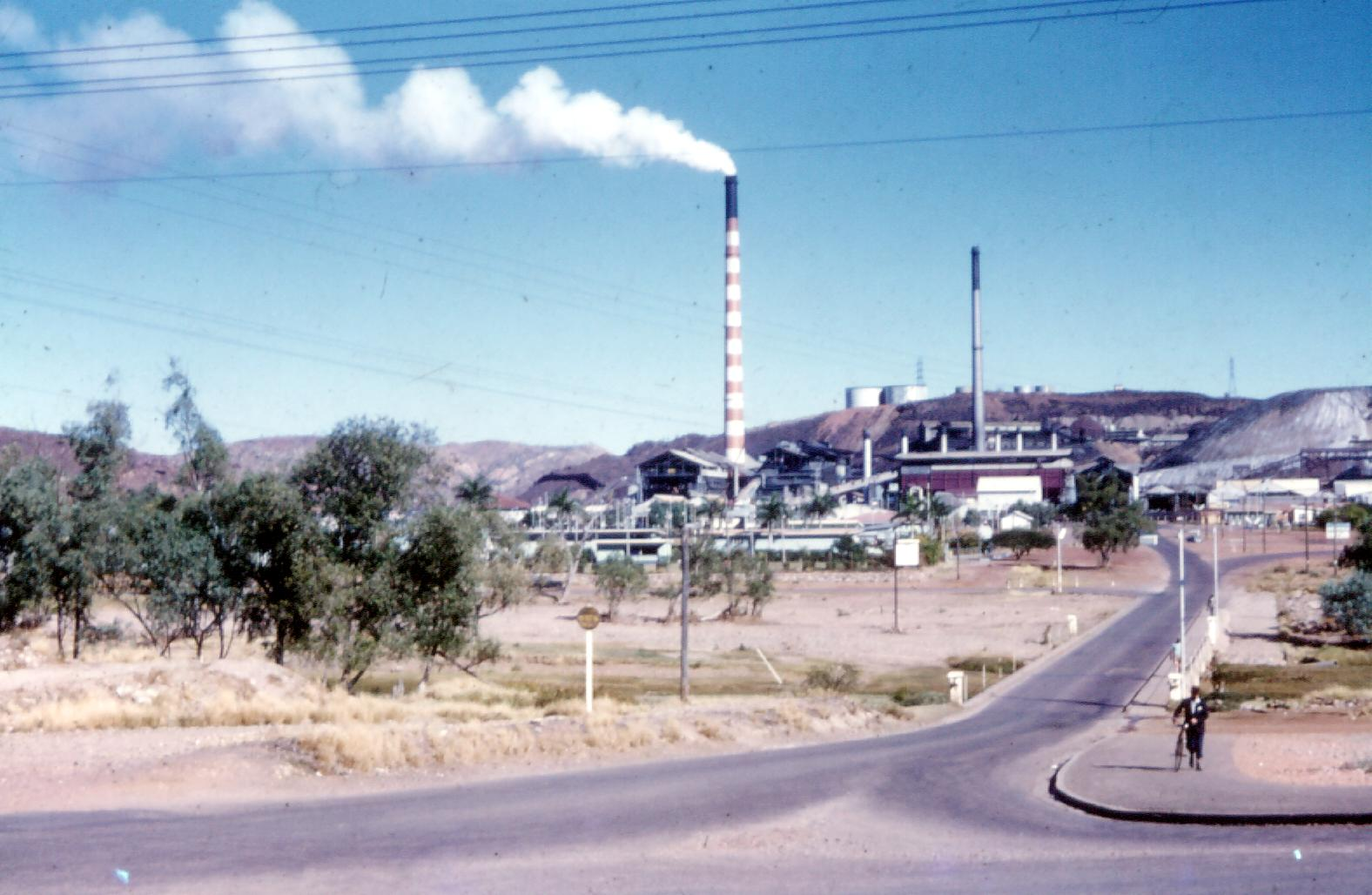
Mount Isa Mines, 1962

The region is source of great mineral wealth such as copper, zinc, lead and silver. Mount Isa Mines includes a number of copper, lead, zinc and silver mines in Mount Isa where production began in 1931. Century Mine, Australia's largest zinc mine began operations near Mount Isa in 1997 and is expected to be exhausted by 2016. Other mines in the region include George Fisher mine, Cannington Mine and Hilton Mine.

=== Environmental concerns ===
Due to the lead production in the town, Mount Isa has one of the most intensive air quality monitoring systems in Australia. Concerns have been raised over childhood lead contamination and air pollution within the region.

== Ecology ==
=== Flora ===
In the Gulf Country there are no mountains to restrict rainfall to the coastal band and the transition from the coastal mangroves through Acacia stenophylla woodlands to the arid scrubs of central Australia is gradual. There are up to nineteen important areas for bird migration in rivermouths along the gulf coast including the Gregory River-Nicholson River estuary and the Roper River in Limmen Bight. The patches of rainforest habitat occur in parts that are less vulnerable to the grassland fires. On the savanna dicanthium bluegrass grows tall after the monsoon rains as the Gulf Country is one of the largest areas of native grassland in Australia. The sandstone gorges of the Gulf Fall are home to a specific wildlife. Finally the Pellew Islands have retained original mangroves and thick woodland..

=== Fauna ===
The area is home to a number of endangered species including an endemic rodent, the Carpentarian rock rat (Zyzomys palatalis) and endemic reptiles such as the Carpentarian lerista skink . The mudflats and saltpans on the coast are home to waterbirds such as the magpie goose. One endemic grassland bird, the Carpentarian grasswren, is suffering as changing fire regimes (the way grasses are systematically burnt and allowed to renew) are reducing their habitat. The region is a hotspot for birdwatching.

=== Threats and preservation ===
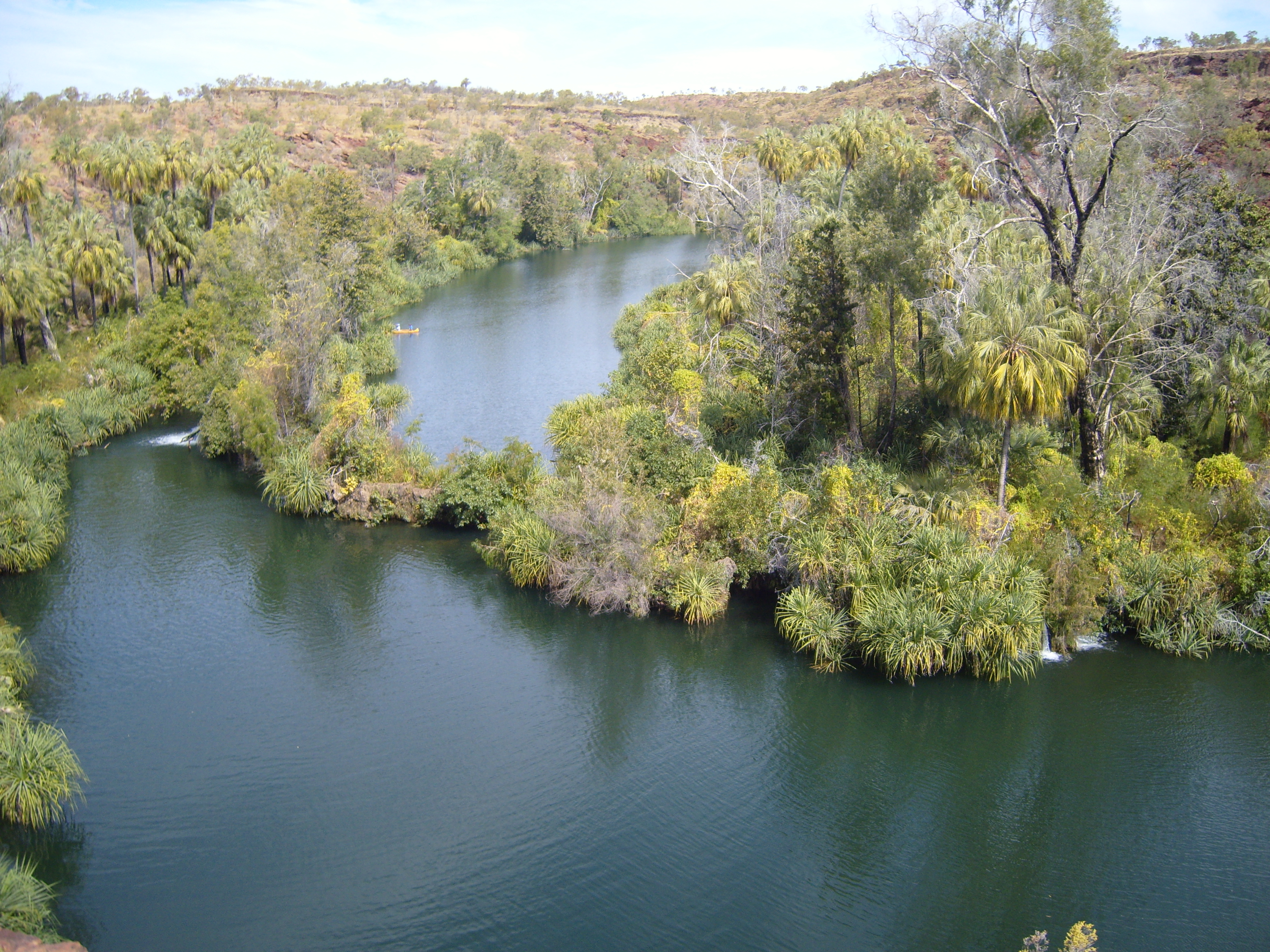
Indarri Falls, Boodjamulla National Park, 2008

Much of the area is unspoilt vegetation but overgrazing of cattle and the introduction of feed grass species is changing both grasslands and wetlands while the woodlands are vulnerable to changing fire regimes. Introduced weeds include the rubber vine. Protected areas include Staaten River National Park, Boodjamulla National Park (formerly Lawn Hill), the World Heritage fossil finds at Riversleigh, Camooweal Caves National Park and Mitchell-Alice Rivers National Park on the Queensland side. However the coastal wetlands are little protected. Lawn Hill crater, an impact crater with a ring of limestone hills, is also located in the Gulf Country. Finally Barranyi (North Island) National Park is one of the Pellew Islands.

=== List of major rivers ===
Top End

- Roper River
- Wilton River

Gulf Country

- Cox River
- Calvert River
- Gilbert River
- Flinders River
- Leichhardt River
- McArthur River
- Norman River

Cape York Peninsula

- Archer River
- Mission River
- Mitchell River
  - Alice River
- Smithburne River
- Staaten River
- Wenlock River

== See also ==
- Regions of Queensland
