= Dutton River =

- Suburb
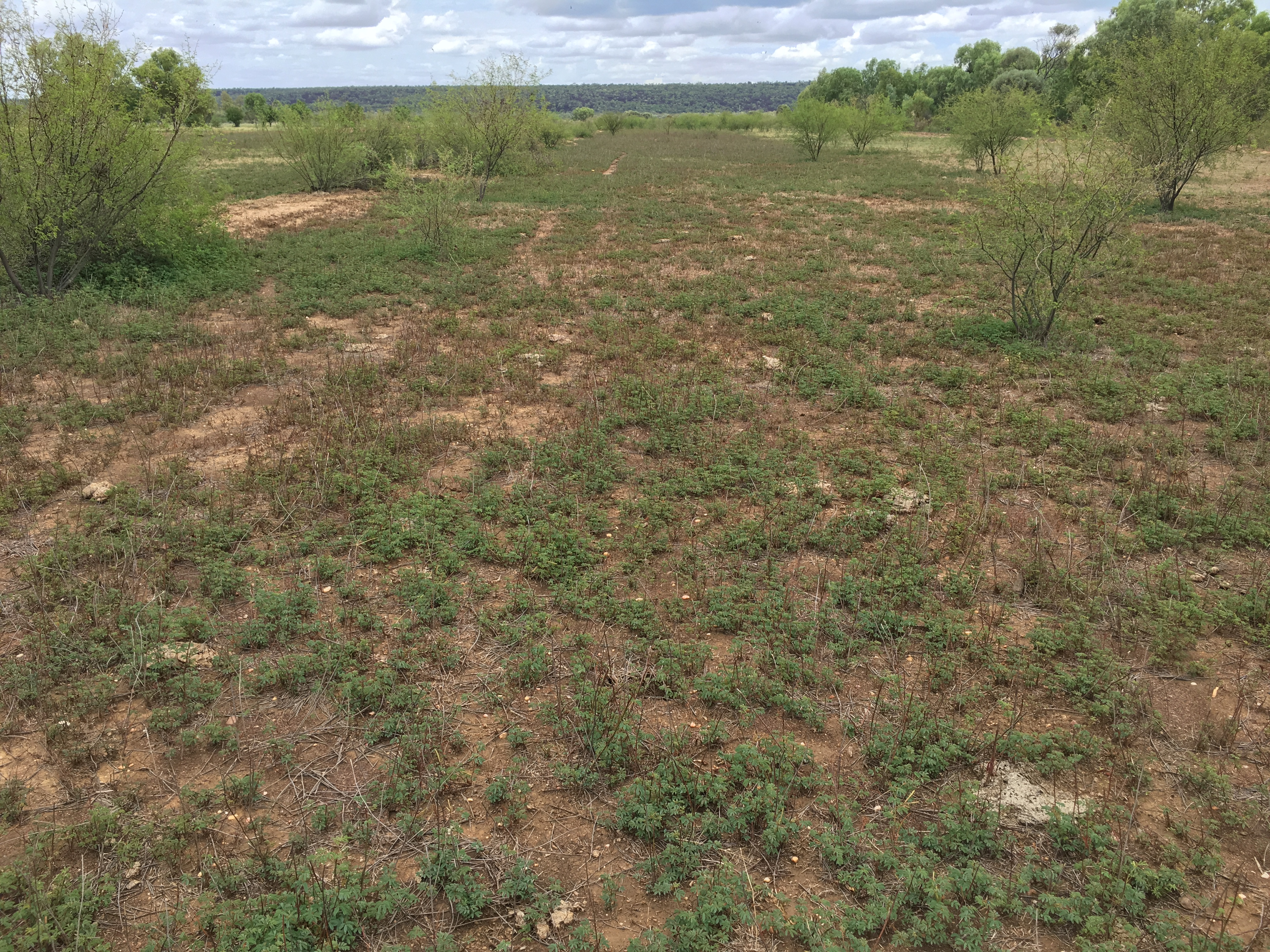
- During drought, 2016

- Interactive map of Dutton River
- Coordinates: 20.3844°S 143.8261°E
- Country: Australia
- State: Queensland
- LGA: Shire of Flinders
- Location: 79.3 km (49.3 mi) NW of Hughenden; 94.3 km (58.6 mi) NE of Richmond; 463 km (288 mi) WSW of Townsville; 1,513 km (940 mi) NW of Brisbane

Government
  - State electorate: Traeger
  - Federal division: Kennedy

Area
  - Total: 5,120.2 km^{2} (1,976.9 sq mi)

Population
  - Total: 66 (2021 census)
  - Density: 0.01289/km^{2} (0.03339/sq mi)
- Time zone: UTC+10:00 (AEST)
- Postcode: 4821
Suburbs around Dutton River
Woolgar	Porcupine	Porcupine
Woolgar	Dutton River	Porcupine
Richmond	Marathon	Hughenden

Dutton River is a rural locality in the Flinders Shire, Queensland, Australia. In the 2021 census, Dutton River had a population of 66 people.

== Geography ==
The Flinders River flows through from south-east to south-west. Dutton River (the watercourse) rises in the locality and forms part of the western boundary before flowing south-west to join the Flinders. The stream known as Stawell River or Cambridge Creek rises in the locality and flows west to the Woolgar River, a tributary of the Flinders.

The locality has the following mountains (from north to south):

- Mount Stewart (20.3552°S 144.0316°E) 555 metres (1,821 ft)
- Mount Desolation (20.5096°S 144.1620°E) 563 metres (1,847 ft)
- The Twins (20.6384°S 143.9113°E) 389 metres (1,276 ft)

The predominant land use is grazing on native vegetation.

== History ==
Jirandali (also known as Yirandali, Warungu, Yirandhali) is an Australian Aboriginal language of North-West Queensland, particularly the Hughenden area. The language region includes the local government area of the Shire of Flinders, including Dutton River, Flinders River, Mount Sturgeon, Caledonia, Richmond, Corfield, Winton, Torrens, Tower Hill, Landsborough Creek, Lammermoor Station, Hughenden, and Tangorin.

Dalleburra (also known as Dalebura, Dal-leyburra, Yirandali) is a language of North-West Queensland, particularly Lammermoor Station via Hughenden. The Dalleburra language region includes the local government boundaries of the Flinders Shire Council.

Dutton River State School opened on 24 January 1972 and closed on 6 June 1977. It was located near the Charlotte Plains homestead (approx 20.4334°S 143.8601°E).

Prior to 19 November 2021, the town of Marathon was within the locality of Stamford. However, this arrangement caused confusion, so on 19 November 2021, a new locality of Marathon was created around the town, excising the land from the localities of Dutton River and Stamford.

== Demographics ==
In the 2016 census, Dutton River had a population of 33 people.

In the 2021 census, Dutton River had a population of 66 people.

== Education ==
There are no schools in Dutton River. The nearest government schools are Richmond State School (Prep-10) in neighbouring Richmond to the south-west and Hughenden State School (Prep-12) in neighbouring Hughenden to the south-east. However, most of the locality is too distant from these schools for a daily commute; the alternatives are distance education and boarding school.
