= Stamford, Queensland =

Stamford
- Town
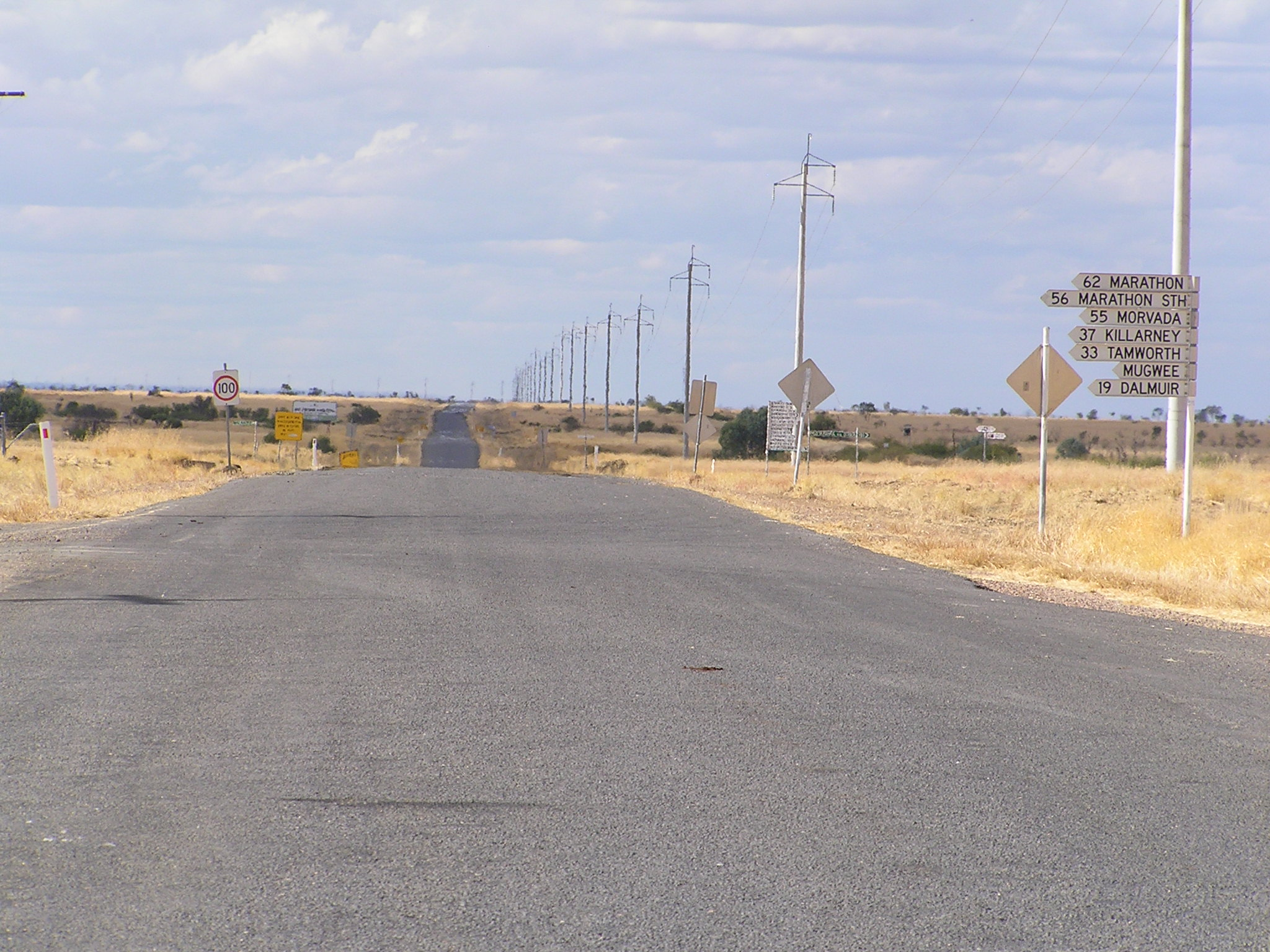
- The Kennedy Developmental Road seen at Stamford Roadhouse

- Interactive map of Stamford
- Coordinates: 21.2641°S 143.8086°E
- Country: Australia
- State: Queensland
- LGA: Shire of Flinders
- Location: 63.3 km (39.3 mi) SW of Hughenden; 152 km (94 mi) NW of Winton; 446 km (277 mi) SW of Townsville; 1,429 km (888 mi) NW of Brisbane

Government
  - State electorate: Traeger
  - Federal division: Kennedy

Area
  - Total: 6,724.8 km^{2} (2,596.5 sq mi)

Population
  - Total: 77 (2021 census)
  - Density: 0.01145/km^{2} (0.02966/sq mi)
- Time zone: UTC+10:00 (AEST)
- Postcode: 4821
Localities around Stamford
Richmond	Marathon	Hughenden
Albion	Stamford	Tangorin
Corfield	Corfield	Tangorin

Stamford is a rural town and locality in the Shire of Flinders, Queensland, Australia. In the 2021 census, the locality of Stamford had a population of 77 people.

== Geography ==
The town is on the Kennedy Developmental Road that links Hughenden and Winton, 1,504 kilometres (935 mi) north west of the state capital, Brisbane and 446 kilometres (277 mi) west of the regional centre of Townsville. It is situated in the north-east of the locality.

Chinbi is a neighbourhood (21.3833°S 143.6833°E) within the locality to the south-west of the town of Stamford based around the former Chinbi railway station.

Whitewood is a neighbourhood (21.4666°S 143.5833°E) within the locality south-west of Chinbi based around the former Whitewood railway station.

The land use is grazing on native vegetation.

== History ==
Stamford was once an overnight stop for Cobb & Co coaches travelling between Winton and Hughenden.

The Hughenden-Winton railway line (a branch line of the Great Northern railway line) opened to Stamford in 1897, closing officially in 2008 and dismantled in 2012. It followed the same route as the Kennedy Developmental Road. There were a number of now-abandoned railway stations on the line within the locality (from north-west to south-east):

- Alba railway station (21.0415°S 144.0355°E)
- Waback railway station (21.0790°S 144.0037°E)
- Warianna railway station (21.1407°S 143.9478°E)
- Stamford railway station, serving the town of Stamford (21.2678°S 143.8098°E)
- Chinbi railway station (21.3919°S 143.6743°E)
- Whitewood railway station (21.4763°S 143.5983°E)
- Tarvano railway station (21.6089°S 143.4728°E)

Stamford Provisional School opened in 1899 and closed in 1906.

The neighbourhood of Chinbi takes its name from the Chinbi railway station, which in turn was named on 18 February 1915 by the Queensland Railways Department. It is an Aboriginal word meaning star.

Stamford State School opened on 23 January 1984. It closed on 29 July 2013. The school was located at 5 Marathon Stamford Road (21.2658°S 143.8083°E). The school's website was partially archived.

On 9 June 2003 in the Queen's Birthday Honours List, Mrs Jean Eva Anderson of Ballater Station of Stamford was awarded the Medal of the Order of Australia for her "service to the community of Hughenden, particularly through the Country Womens Association". She had given 52 years of service to the Hughenden branch of the Queensland Country Women's Association. Her award was presented to her by the then Governor of Queensland, Quentin Bryce.

In 2012, the town of Stamford consisted of a roadhouse and has a permanent population of 3.

Prior to 19 November 2021, the town of Marathon was within the locality of Stamford. However, this arrangement caused confusion, so on 19 November 2021, a new locality of Marathon was created around the town, excising the land from the localities of Dutton River and Stamford.

== Demographics ==
In the 2006 census, the locality of Stamford and the surrounding area had a population of 75 people.

In the 2016 census, the locality of Stamford had a population of 43 people.

In the 2021 census, the locality of Stamford had a population of 77 people.

== Economy ==
There are a number of homesteads in the locality, including:

- Abbotsford (21.2112°S 143.6305°E)
- Afton Downs (20.9985°S 144.0038°E)
- Aireworth (21.4679°S 143.9510°E)
- Cannonball (20.9297°S 143.8864°E)
- Cannum Downs (20.9574°S 143.4154°E)
- Conamore (21.6049°S 143.4561°E)
- Coorabelle (21.6515°S 143.6952°E)
- Cracrin (21.4606°S 143.4261°E)
- Dalmuir (21.1419°S 143.6996°E)
- Eldorado (21.2441°S 143.9075°E)
- Elvira (21.4475°S 143.6269°E)
- Glenelg (21.5951°S 143.5347°E)
- Hazelwood (20.9939°S 143.9120°E)
- Hilltop (20.9125°S 143.3824°E)
- Hillview (21.0440°S 144.0991°E)
- Illalong (21.0207°S 143.5380°E)
- Kalboona (20.8523°S 143.5260°E)
- Katandra (21.5484°S 143.8019°E)
- Killarney (20.9767°S 143.6996°E)
- Limbri (21.1478°S 143.9504°E)
- Maidavale (21.6473°S 143.7577°E)
- Malakoff Downs (21.2068°S 143.8044°E)
- Maranie (21.3577°S 143.8863°E)
- Marathon South (20.9003°S 143.5839°E)
- Moonby Downs (21.1054°S 143.9370°E)
- Morvada (20.9144°S 143.5602°E)
- Mugwee Outstation (21.1356°S 143.5785°E)
- Nottingham Downs (21.3305°S 143.5131°E)
- Ophir Downs (21.0393°S 143.4744°E)
- Roscaven (21.3886°S 143.5449°E)
- Stamford Downs (21.2567°S 143.8817°E)
- Stanley Downs (21.3186°S 143.9784°E)
- Star Downs (21.2091°S 143.3898°E)
- Tamworth (21.0477°S 143.6697°E)
- Terranburby (21.0918°S 143.4716°E)
- Thornhill (20.9332°S 143.7295°E)
- Vellum Downs (21.5087°S 143.5609°E)
- Vuna (21.3735°S 143.5064°E)
- Waihaorunga (21.5212°S 143.5948°E)
- Warianna Outstation (21.0083°S 143.8294°E)
- Weanbah (21.2019°S 143.5127°E)
- Wilfred Downs (21.0493°S 143.9609°E)
- Woolfield (21.7444°S 143.6574°E)
- Wyoming (21.2226°S 143.5644°E)

== Education ==
There are no schools in Stamford. The nearest government primary schools are Hughenden State School in neighbouring Hughenden to the north-east and Cameron Downs State School in neighbouring Tangorin to the east. The nearest government secondary school is Hughenden State School which provides schooling to Year 12. However, given the size of the locality, the distances involved may necessitate using alternatives such as distance education and boarding schools.

== Events ==
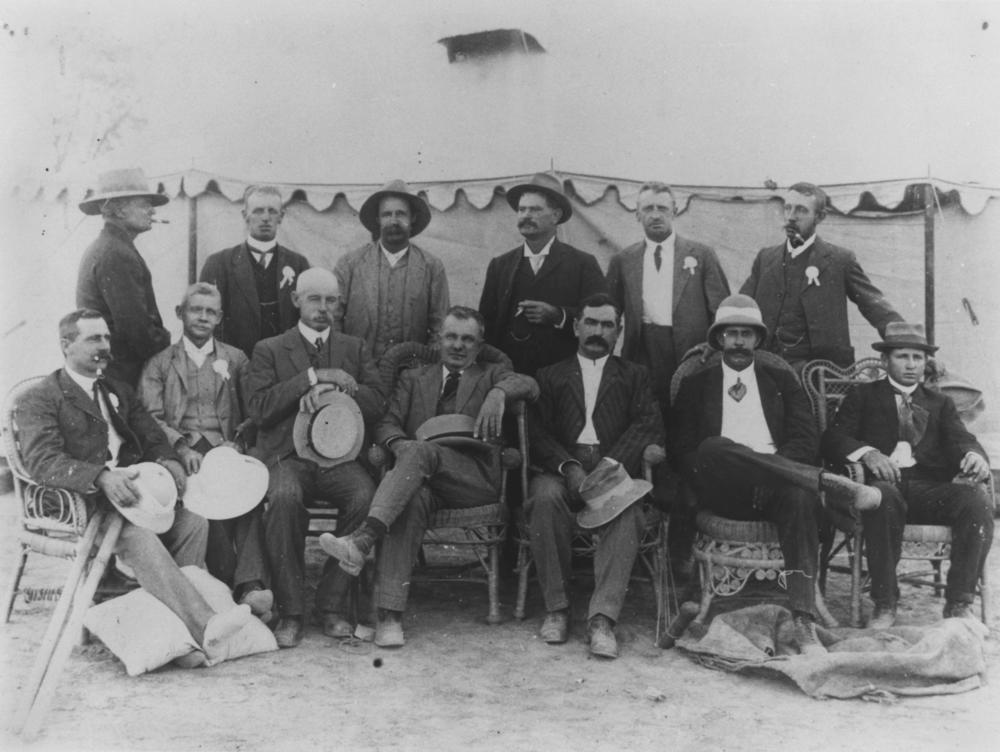
Men from Winton attending the Stamford races, 1912

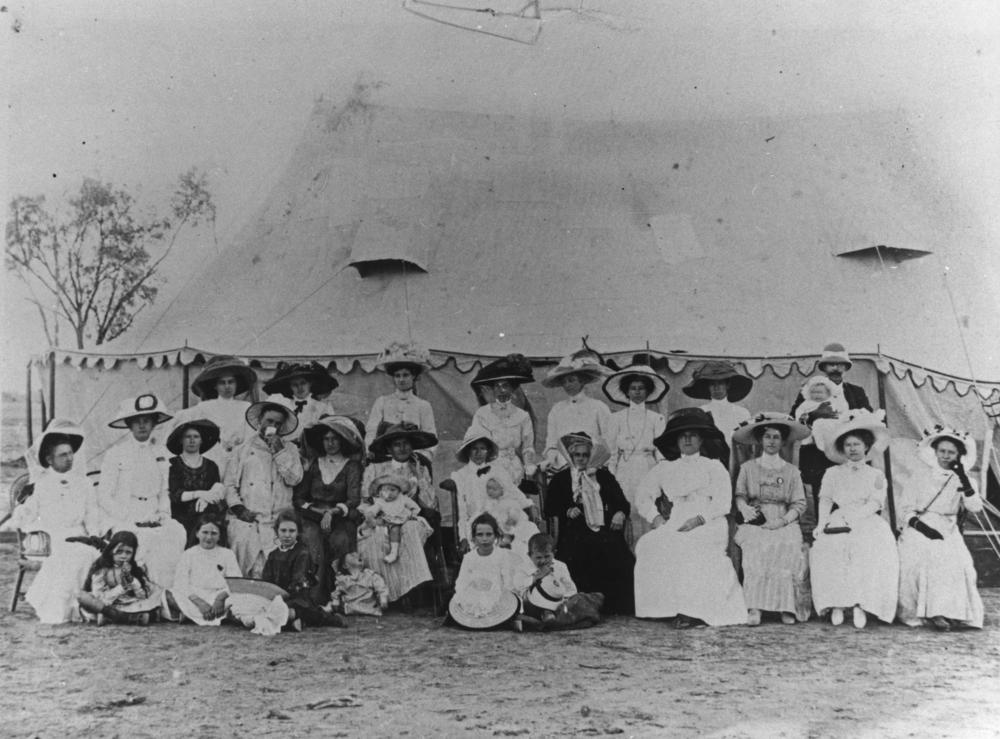
Ladies from Winton attending the Stamford Races, 1912

The Stamford Races are a popular social event in the area involving horse racing.
