= Lawn Hill =

Lawn Hill may refer to:

== Australia ==
- Lawn Hill National Park, now Boodjamulla National Park, Queensland, Australia
  - Lawn Hill Station, a cattle station in Queensland, formerly including the land now Boodjamulla National Park
- Lawn Hill, Queensland, a locality in the Shire of Burke
- Lawn Hill crater, an impact crater in Australia

== United States ==
- Lawn Hill, Iowa, an unincorporated community in the United States
