= Town of Hughenden =

Local government area of Queensland, Australia

Coordinates: 20.840°S 144.197°E

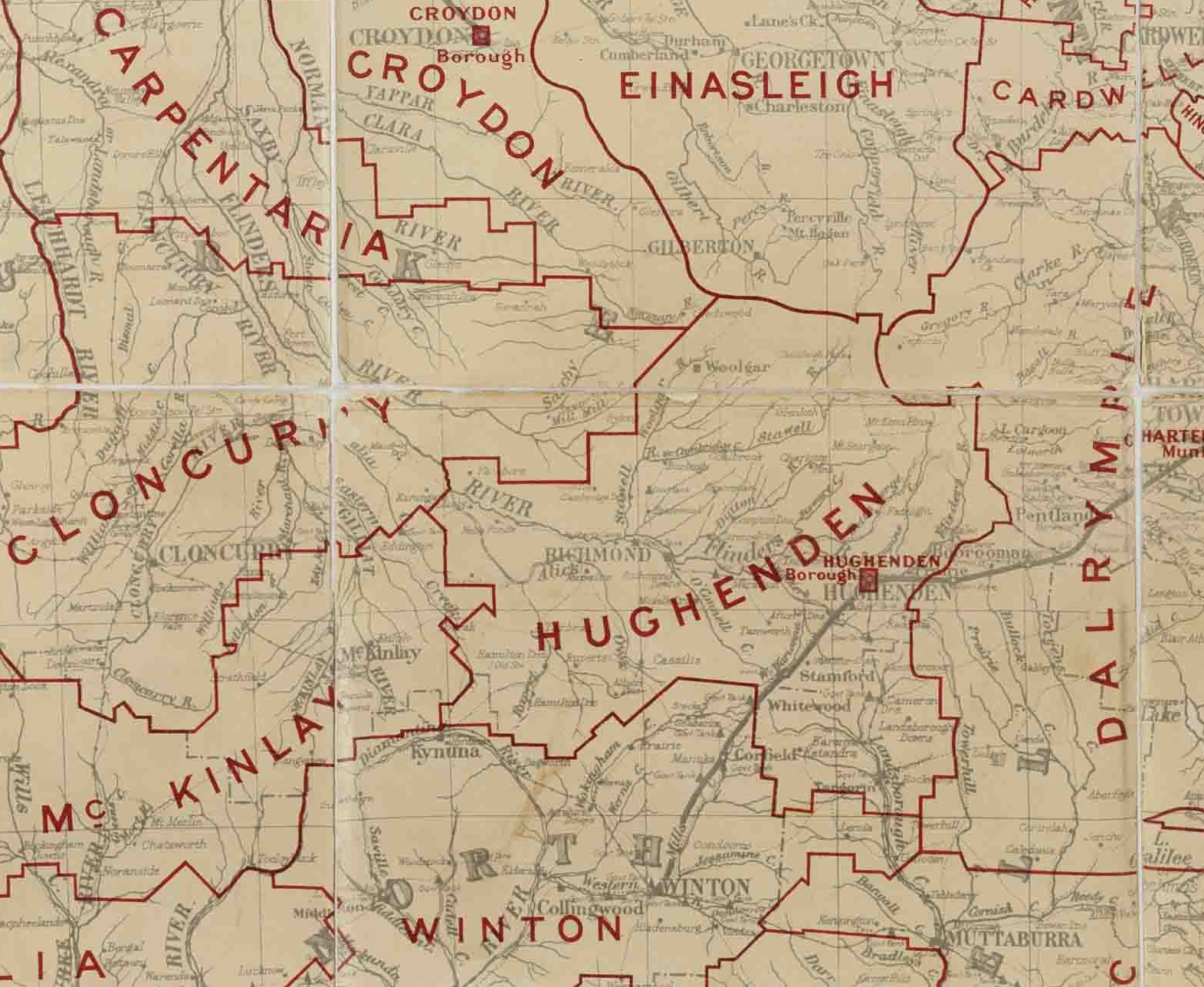
Map of Borough of Hughenden (enclosed by the Division of Hughenden) and adjacent local government areas, March 1902

The Town of Hughenden is a former local government area in North Queensland, Australia.

== History ==
The Hughenden Division was established on 22 April 1882 under the Divisional Boards Act 1879. On 20 April 1887, the Borough of Hughenden was separated from it and constituted separately as a municipality for the emerging town of Hughenden.

With the passage of the Local Authorities Act 1902, the Borough of Hughenden became the Town of Hughenden on 31 March 1903.

On 15 March 1958, the Town of Hughenden was abolished and absorbed into the Shire of Flinders.

== Mayors ==
- 1887: Louis Goldring (later Member of the Queensland Legislative Assembly for Flinders)
- 1927: Edward Everett Phillips
