= Shire of Flinders (Queensland) =

Coordinates: 20°50′34″S 144°12′02″E

- Local government area
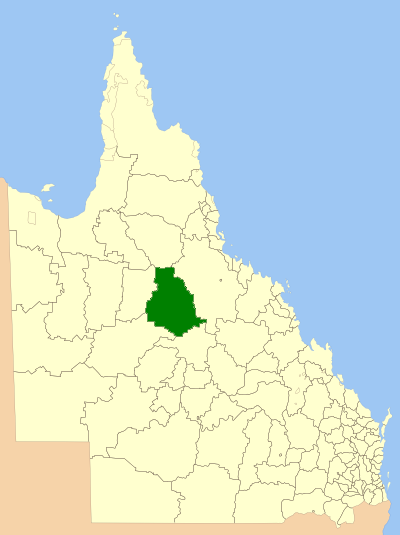
- Location within Queensland

- Interactive map of Shire of Flinders
- Country: Australia
- State: Queensland
- Region: North West Queensland
- Established: 1882
- Council seat: Hughenden

Government
  - Mayor: Jane McNamara
  - State electorate: Traeger
  - Federal division: Kennedy

Area
  - Total: 41,200 km^{2} (15,900 sq mi)

Population
  - Total: 1,500 (2021 census)
  - Density: 0.0364/km^{2} (0.094/sq mi)
- Website: Shire of Flinders
LGAs around Shire of Flinders
Etheridge	Etheridge	Charters Towers
Richmond	Shire of Flinders	Charters Towers
Winton	Barcaldine	Charters Towers

The Shire of Flinders is a local government area in north-western Queensland, Australia.

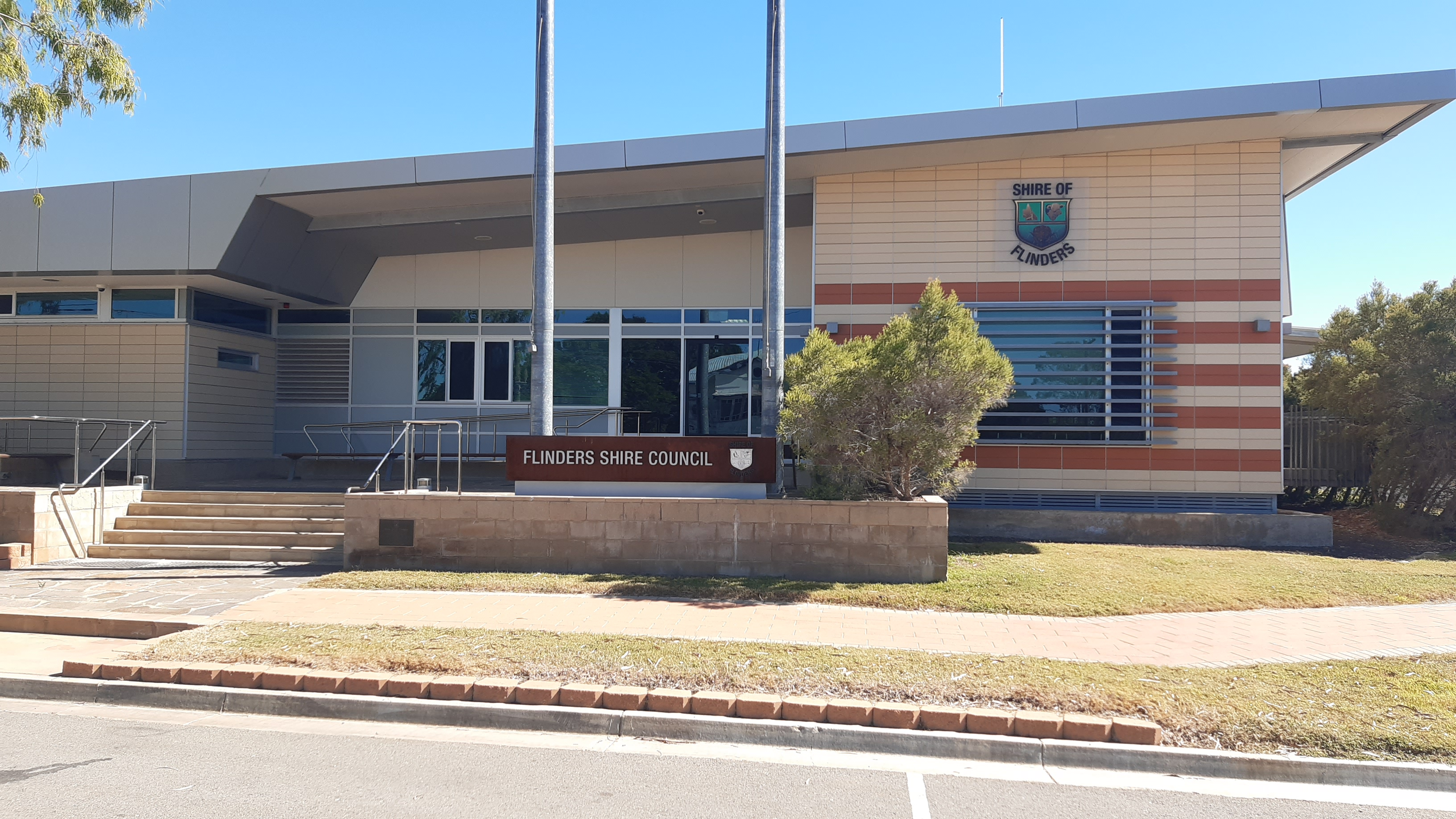
Flinders Shire Council offices in Hughenden

It covers an area of 41,200 square kilometres (15,907.4 sq mi), and has existed as a local government entity since 1882. The Shire, named for the Flinders River, is predominantly a grazing area with cattle in the north of the shire and mixed grazing to the south in the black soil area.

In the 2021 census, the Shire of Flinders had a population of 1,500 people.

== History ==
Jirandali (also known as Yirandali, Warungu, Yirandhali) is an Australian Aboriginal language of North-West Queensland, particularly the Hughenden area. The language region includes the local government area of the Shire of Flinders, including Dutton River, Flinders River, Mount Sturgeon, Caledonia, Richmond, Corfield, Winton, Torrens, Tower Hill, Landsborough Creek, Lammermoor Station, Hughenden, and Tangorin.

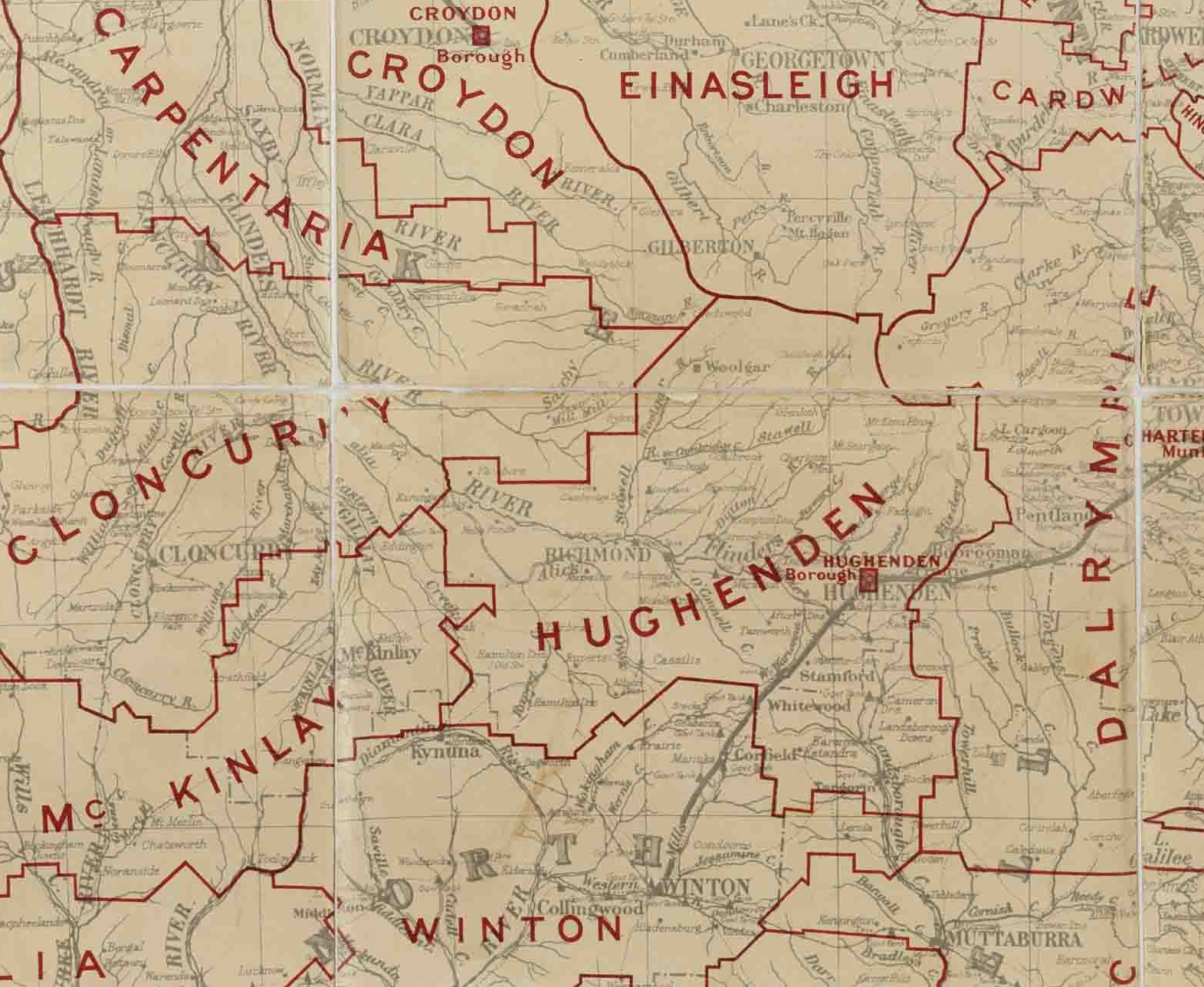
Map of Hughenden Division and adjacent local government areas, March 1902

The Hughenden Division was established on 20 July 1882 under the Divisional Boards Act 1879. On 20 April 1887, the Borough of Hughenden was constituted separately as a municipality for the emerging town of Hughenden.

On 31 March 1903, the Hughenden Division became the Shire of Hughenden and the Borough of Hughenden became the Town of Hughenden under the Local Authorities Act 1902. On 5 September of the same year, the Shire of Hughenden was renamed Shire of Flinders.

The western part of the Shire was separately incorporated as the Shire of Wyangarie (later Shire of Richmond) on 23 October 1915. On 1 January 1930, part of the Shire of Flinders was annexed to the Shire of Dalrymple.

In 1958, the Town of Hughenden amalgamated with the Shire of Flinders.

Prior to 19 November 2021, the town of Marathon was within the locality of Stamford. However, this arrangement caused confusion, so on 19 November 2021, a new locality of Marathon was created around the town, excising the land from the localities of Dutton River and Stamford.

== Towns and localities ==
The Shire of Flinders includes the following settlements:

- Hughenden
- Dutton River
- Marathon
- Porcupine
- Prairie
- Stamford
- Tangorin
- Torrens Creek

== Amenities ==
The Flinders Shire Council operate the Flinders Shire Library at 39 Gray Street, Hughenden.

== Demographics ==
Year	Population	Notes
1933	3,426^{‡}	
1947	3,310^{‡}	
1954	3,293^{‡}	
1961	3,953	
1966	3,716	
1971	3,019	
1976	2,875	
1981	2,740	
1986	2,804	
1991	2,491	
1996	2,232	
2001 census	2,151	
2006 census	1,792	
2011 census	1,791	
2016 census	1,536	
2021 census	1,500	

- ‡ – includes then-separate Town.

== Chairmen and mayors ==
- 1897: D. Simson
- 1927: E. M. Geary
- 2008–2012: Brendan McNamara (elected unopposed)
- 2012–2016: Greg Jones (elected unopposed)
- 2016–2020: Jane Beatrice McNamara
