= Corfield, Queensland =

Corfield
- Town
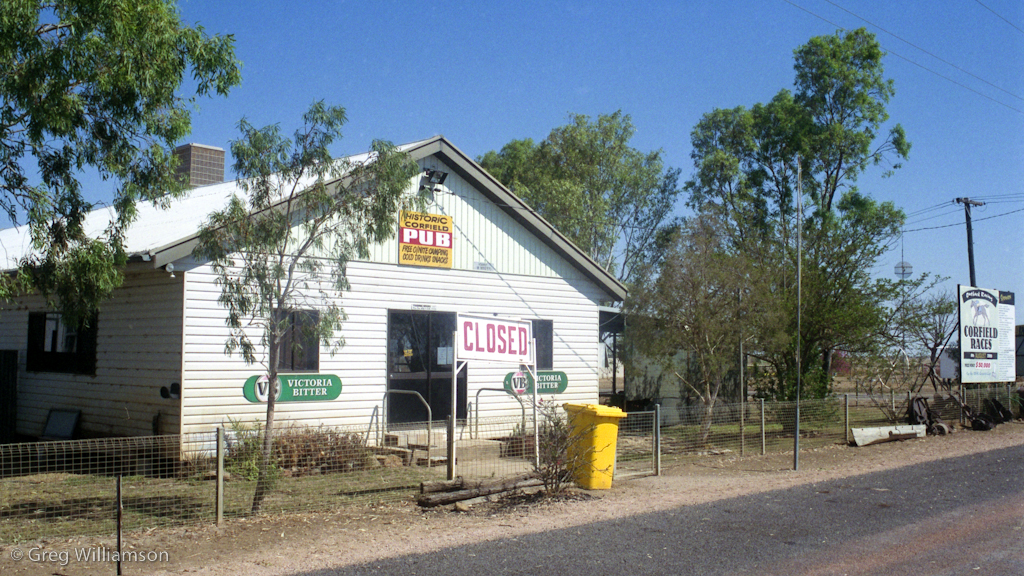
- The historic Corfield Pub. A sign promoting the Corfield Cup can also be seen.

- Interactive map of Corfield
- Coordinates: 21.7130°S 143.375°E
- Country: Australia
- State: Queensland
- LGA: Shire of Winton
- Location: 85 km (53 mi) NE of Winton; 553 km (344 mi) SE of Mount Isa; 513 km (319 mi) SW of Townsville; 1,438 km (894 mi) NW of Brisbane

Government
  - State electorate: Gregory
  - Federal division: Maranoa

Area
  - Total: 15,788.3 km^{2} (6,095.9 sq mi)

Population
  - Total: 158 (2021 census)
  - Density: 0.01001/km^{2} (0.02592/sq mi)
- Time zone: UTC+10:00 (AEST)
- Postcode: 4733
Localities around Corfield
Albion; Kynuna =	Stamford	Tangorin
Middleton	Corfield	Prairie
Opalton; Winton	Longreach	Muttaburra

Corfield is a rural town and locality in the Shire of Winton in north-western Queensland, Australia. In the 2021 census, the locality of Corfield had a population of 158 people.

== Geography ==
The town is on the Kennedy Developmental Road—the road linking Winton and Hughenden—1,438 kilometres (894 mi) north west of the state capital Brisbane and 513 kilometres (319 mi) south west of the regional centre of Townsville. The Landsborough Highway also passes through the locality (but not through the town) merging with the Kennedy Developmental Road just before crossing into Winton. The Central Western railway line passes through the south of the locality to its terminus at Winton railway station. The Richmond–Winton Road follows a section of the north-western boundary.

The principal land use is cattle grazing.

As the boundaries of Winton hug the grid layout of its streets, a number of Winton's facilities are actually located in Corfield. These include the Winton Golf Course and the Winton Showground and Racecourse. As Winton uses bore water from the Great Artesian Basin, this water emerges at 83 to 86 °C (181 to 187 °F) and is cooled in ponds in Corfield to 44 °C (111 °F) before it is circulated through Winton.

== History ==
Jirandali (also known as Yirandali, Warungu, Yirandhali) is an Australian Aboriginal language of North-West Queensland, particularly the Hughenden area. The language region includes the local government area of the Shire of Flinders, including Dutton River, Flinders River, Mount Sturgeon, Caledonia, Richmond, Corfield, Winton, Torrens, Tower Hill, Landsborough Creek, Lammermoor Station, Hughenden, and Tangorin.

In its earlier incarnation as a Cobb & Co changing station along the Hughenden to Winton mail route, the locality was named Manuka—after a nearby sheep station.

When the railway linking Hughenden and Winton was built in 1899, the town was moved 1 kilometre (0.62 mi) west to the line and renamed Corfield after William Henry Corfield—a local carrier and businessman, who, as Member of the Queensland Legislative Assembly for Gregory 1888-99 lobbied for the rail link. The population of the town peaked at around thirty to forty residents and facilities included "five railway houses, plus the station master’s house, a post office, two petrol depots, a hotel and a school and teacher’s house ... a goods shed and railway building."

Corfield Post Office opened on 5 October 1898 and closed in 1991.

Corfield State School opened on 4 February 1957 and closed on 31 January 1975. It reopened on 27 January 1976 but closed again on 15 December 1989.

== Demographics ==
In the 2006 census, the locality of Corfield and the surrounding area had a population of 162 people.

In the 2011 census, the locality of Corfield and the surrounding area had a population of 380 people.

As at 2012, the population of the town of Corfield had declined with a permanent town population of seven.

In the 2016 census, the locality of Corfield had a population of 183 people.

In the 2021 census, the locality of Corfield had a population of 158 people.

== Education ==
There are no schools in Corfield. The nearest government school is Winton State School in Winton the south-west, which provides primary and secondary schooling (Prep to Year 12). However, due to distance, this school is only accessible by students living in the south-west of Corfield. The alternatives are distance education and boarding school.

== Facilities ==
The Corfield Pub is the main community facility in the village.

== Events ==
The major social event in Corfield is the Corfield Cup horse race run in early August—a pun on the better known Caulfield Cup horse race run in Melbourne.
