= Prairie, Queensland =

Prairie
- Town
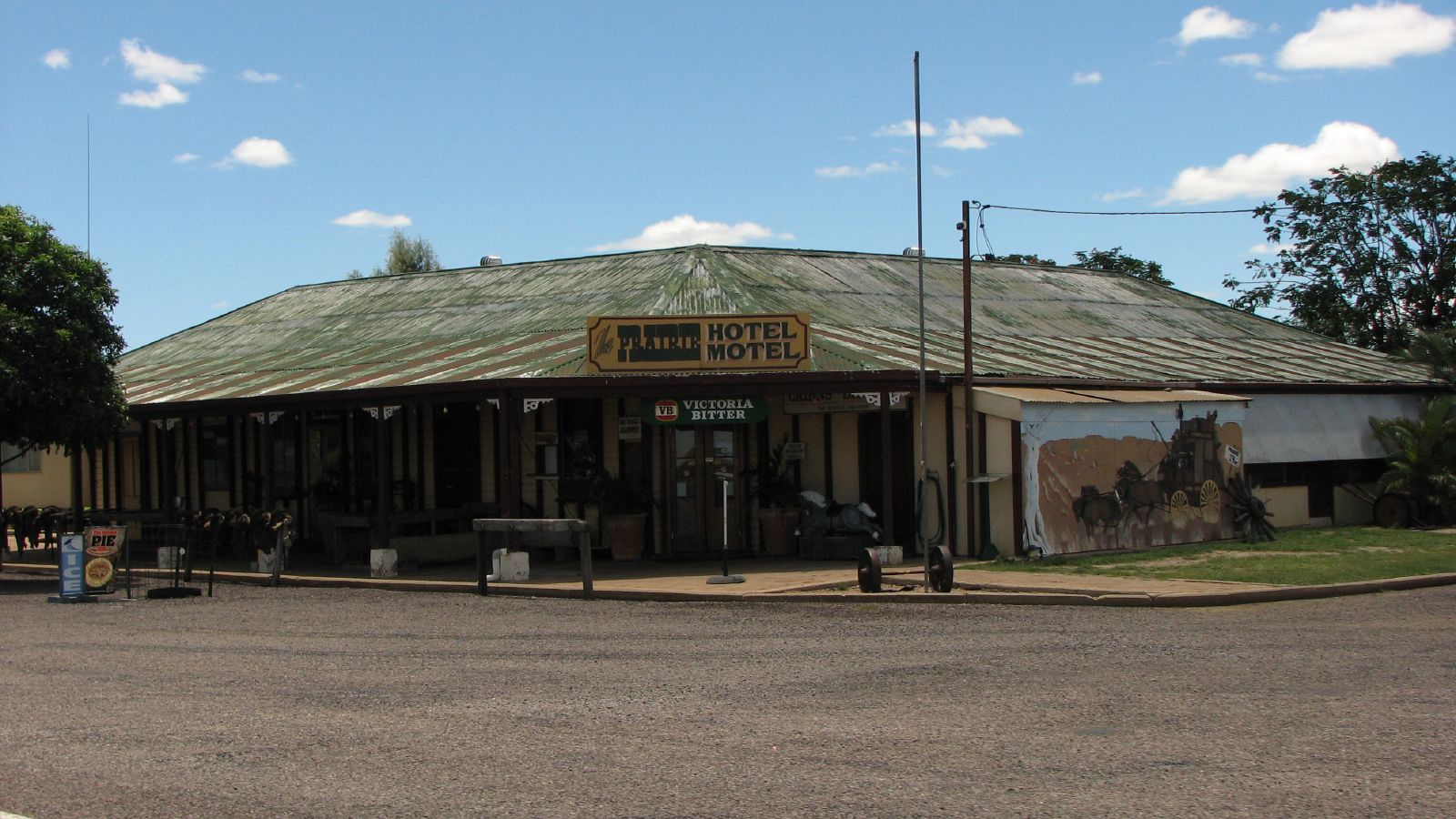
- Prairie Hotel Motel

- Interactive map of Prairie
- Coordinates: 20.8694°S 144.6022°E
- Country: Australia
- State: Queensland
- LGA: Shire of Flinders
- Location: 44.1 km (27.4 mi) E of Hughenden; 339 km (211 mi) WSW of Townsville; 566 km (352 mi) E of Mount Isa; 1,424 km (885 mi) NW of Brisbane

Government
  - State electorate: Traeger
  - Federal division: Kennedy

Area
  - Total: 8,318.3 km^{2} (3,211.7 sq mi)

Population
  - Total: 116 (2021 census)
  - Density: 0.01395/km^{2} (0.03612/sq mi)
- Time zone: UTC+10:00 (AEST)
- Postcode: 4821
Localities around Prairie
Hughenden	Porcupine	Torrens Creek
Tangorin	Prairie	Torrens Creek
Corfield	Muttaburra	Aramac

Prairie is a rural town and locality in the Flinders Shire, Queensland, Australia. In the 2021 census, the locality of Prairie had a population of 116 people.

== Geography ==
The town is located in the north of the locality. The Flinders Highway enters the locality from the north-east (Torrens Creek), passes through the town and exits to the north-west (Hughenden).

The Great Northern railway line runs parallel and immediately south of the highway, with the following railway stations (east to west):

- Warreah railway station, in the north-east of the locality (20.8280°S 144.8026°E)
- Karoon railway station, now abandoned (20.8453°S 144.7258°E)
- Prairie railway station, serving the town (20.8717°S 144.6009°E)
- Baronta railway station, now abandoned (20.8778°S 144.5175°E)
- Tolkuru railway station, now abandoned (20.8757°S 144.4535°E)
- Tindo railway station, in the north-west of the locality (20.8719°S 144.4166°E)
- Jardine Valley railway station, now abandoned (20.8694°S 144.3902°E)

== History ==
The name Prairie comes from a pastoral station established by James Gilson who named it after the appearance of the local countryside.

Prairie State School opened in 1894.

== Demographics ==
In the 2006 census, the locality of Prairie and the surrounding area had a population of 103 people.

In the 2016 census, the locality of Prairie had a population of 143 people.

In the 2021 census, the locality of Prairie had a population of 116 people.

== Education ==
Prairie State School is a government primary (Prep-6) school for boys and girls at Savage Street (20.8707°S 144.6053°E). In 2018, the school had an enrolment of 7 students with 1 teacher and 2 non-teaching staff (1 full-time equivalent).

There is no secondary school in Prairie. The nearest is Hughenden State School (to Year 12) in neighbouring Hughenden to the north-west.

Given the size of the locality, these schools will be too distant from those living in the south of the locality. Distance education or boarding schools are the alternatives.

== Amenities ==
The town is serviced by a hotel/motel (pub) and a cafe/post office.
