= Marathon, Queensland =

Marathon
- Town
- Interactive map of Marathon
- Coordinates: 20.8608°S 143.57°E
- Country: Australia
- State: Queensland
- LGA: Shire of Flinders
- Location: 48.5 km (30.1 mi) ESE of Richmond; 67.7 km (42.1 mi) W of Hughenden; 451 km (280 mi) WSW of Townsville; 454 km (282 mi) E of Mount Isa; 1,500 km (930 mi) NW of Brisbane
- Established: 1916

Government
  - State electorate: Traeger
  - Federal division: Kennedy

Area
  - Total: 6,724.8 km^{2} (2,596.5 sq mi)
- Time zone: UTC+10:00 (AEST)
- Postcode: 4821
Localities around Marathon
Richmond	Dutton River	Dutton River
Richmond	Marathon	Hughenden
Stamford	Stamford	Stamford

Marathon is a rural town and locality in the Flinders Shire, Queensland, Australia. Although the town has existed since c. 1916, the locality was created in November 2021.

== Geography ==
The Great Northern railway line passes through the locality, entering from the east (Hughenden) and exiting to the west (Richmond) with the locality served by the following railway stations (from east to west):

- Boree railway station in the east of the locality (20.8650°S 143.9721°E)
- Marathon railway station, serving the town (20.8629°S 143.5735°E)
- Barabon railway station in far west of the locality (20.8460°S 143.4312°E)

The Flinders Highway runs parallel and immediately north of the railway line with two exceptions, at Marathon railway station and Barabon railway station, where it bypasses further north.

The town is in the west of the locality. The town never developed. It lies between the Flinders Highway and the Marathon railway station.

== History ==
The name Marathon derives from the pastoral run name first used by the lessees in 1863, at the suggestion of William Lempriere Frederick Sheaffe, the Commissioner of Crown Lands Kennedy District, using a Greek historical name. The town of Marathon first appears on a 1916 survey plan.

The Great Northern railway line from Townsville reached Marathon on 15 December 1903. The speed on the line was limited to 10 miles per hour (16 km/h).

Before 19 November 2021, the town of Marathon was within the locality of Stamford. However, this arrangement caused confusion, so on 19 November 2021, a new locality of Marathon was created around the town, excising the land from the localities of Dutton River and Stamford.

== Education ==
There are no schools in Marathon. For students living in the east of the locality, Hughenden State School in neighbouring Hughenden to the east offers primary education and secondary education to Year 10. For students living in the west of the locality, Richmond State School in neighbouring Richmond to the west offers primary education and secondary education to Year 10. For students living in other parts of the locality, the alternatives are distance education and boarding school. There is no school in the vicinity offering secondary schooling to Year 12; again, the alternatives are distance education and boarding school.
