= Hughenden-Winton railway line =

Former railway line in Queensland, Australia

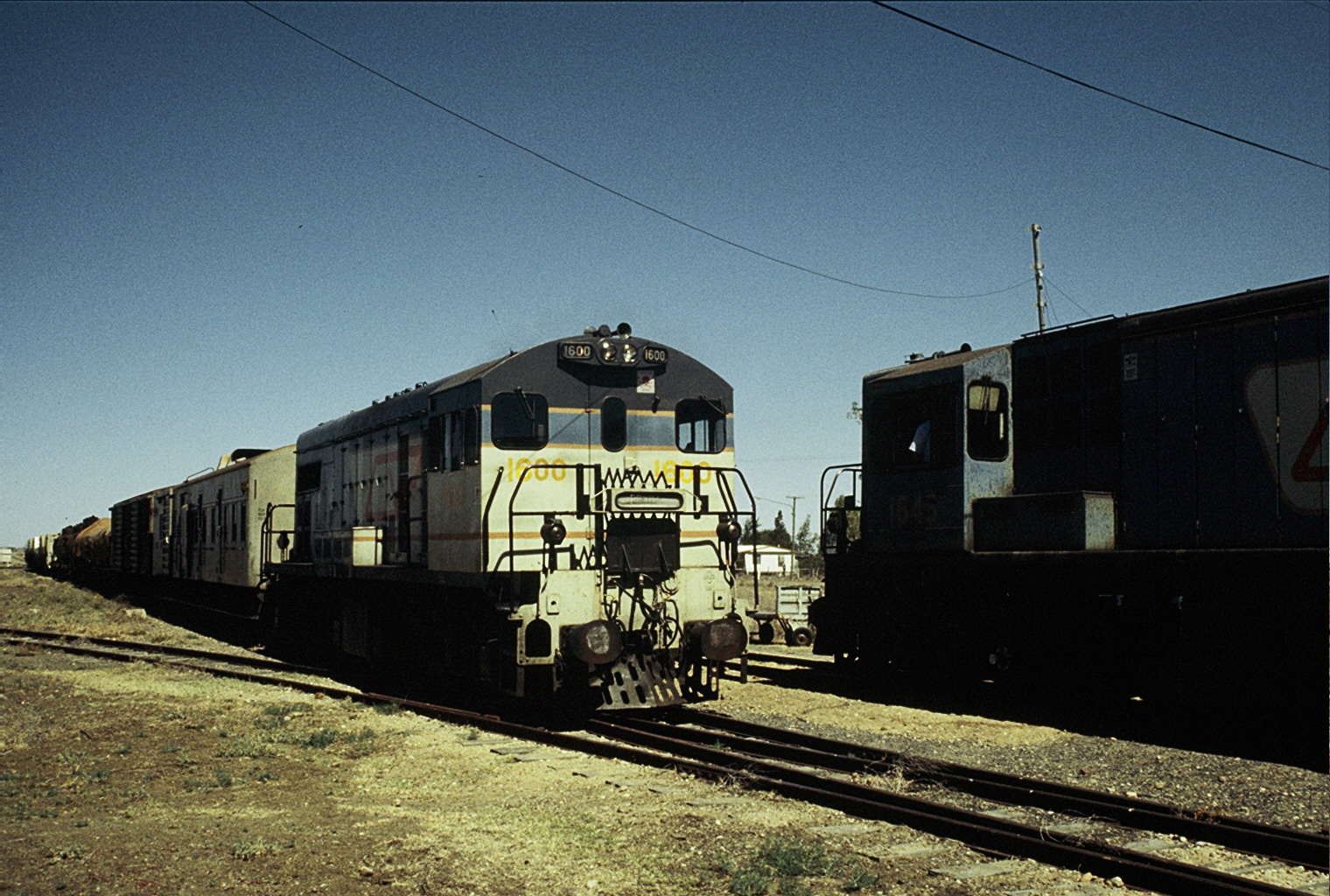
- QR 1600 Class leader 1600 hauling the Winton-Hughenden mixed train crosses 1645, September 1989. Note the combined passenger and guards van immediately behind 1600

Overview
- Locale: Queensland, Australia
- Termini: Hughenden; Winton

Service
- Type: Railway line

History
- Opened: 1895
- Closed: 2008

Technical
- Line length: 212 km (132 mi)

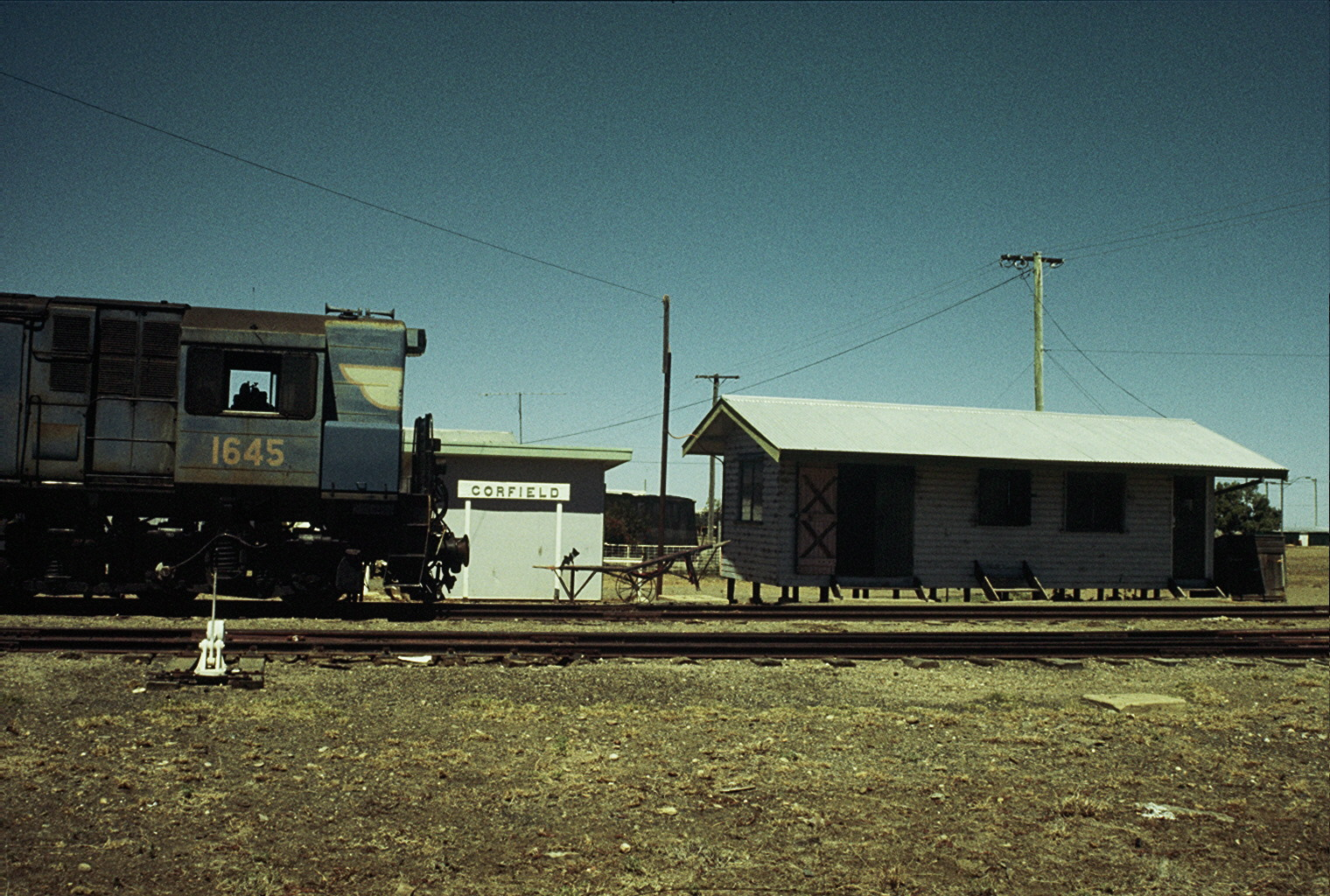
QR 1620 Class Locomotive 1645 at Corfield Station, September 1989

The Hughenden-Winton railway line was a railway line in Queensland, Australia, branching from the Mt Isa line at Hughenden and connecting to the Central West line at Winton.

It was originally part of the Great Northern Railway (Mt Isa line), but was later downgraded to branch line status when the extension west of Hughenden opened.

== History ==
Queensland is the second largest of the Australian States and Territories by area. Its vast interior was largely opened up by the construction of three east-west railway lines that connected the interior of the State to the eastern coastal towns of Brisbane, Rockhampton and Townsville. The trunk lines were the Main Line and Western Line from Brisbane to Roma and Charleville (completed in 1888), the Central West line from Rockhampton to Emerald and Longreach (completed in 1892), and the Great Northern Line from Townsville to Charters Towers and Hughenden (completed in 1887). But those termini were still some 500 kilometres from Queensland’s western border.

It was later decided that each of the routes should be extended to the south-west. In the case of the Western Line an extension to Cunnamulla was opened in 1898. The Central West Line was extended from Jericho south-west to Blackall and opened in 1908 whilst a further extension to Yaraka opened in 1917. Also in 1917 the Quilpie Line was opened from Westgate (south of Charleville) due west to Quilpie. The last two extensions were part of the Great Western Railway proposal.

=== Competing interests ===
A proposal to extend the Great Northern Line from Hughenden south-west to Winton was opposed by Rockhampton interests who presumably lobbied for an extension from Longreach north-west to Winton. But the south-west route prevailed and construction approval was granted in 1895. Although it was to be an extension of the Great Northern Railway it appears that the line beyond Hughenden was later renamed the Winton Branch because of extensions due west of Hughenden to Richmond were completed in 1904, to Cloncurry in 1908, to Duchess in 1912 and to Mount Isa in 1929. The Great Northern Railway then stretched nearly 1,000 kilometres.

=== Connection to Rockhampton ===
In 1928 and some thirty years after the Hughenden to Winton project, the Central West line was extended from Longreach to Winton thereby connecting two of the original trunk lines.

== Construction ==
The Winton Branch was 212 kilometres in length and constructed in three stages of 62, 67 and 83 kilometres. The first stage to Stamford via Warianna siding opened on 13 December 1897. The next stage took the line to Corfield (previously called Manuka) on 15 October 1898. Stops were established along the way at Chinbi and Tarvano. The last stage opened to Winton on 5 July 1899 with tiny stops at Olio, Lana, Prubi, Oondooroo and Rangelands.

The branch not only allowed passengers to travel between Winton and Townsville in a day (albeit a 17-hour journey) but it also facilitated a rapid expansion of the wool industry in the Winton area. A mail train ran three times a week and a goods train ran to Hughenden. Services were later reduced to one per week.

=== Decline ===
As was the case with many of Queensland’s railways, freight traffic steadily declined to the point that the Winton Branch became uneconomical to maintain. Last patronised in the mid 1990s, the branch closed in 2008. In 2012 it was reported that some 8,500 tonnes of track, 320,000 sleepers and 1.3 million dog spikes were removed and resold or recycled.

The Hughenden to Winton Road that largely runs parallel to the old track has been sealed so as to provide an alternative route to the North Queensland coast when the Capricorn and Flinders Highways leading to Rockhampton and Townsville are cut by floodwaters.

== See also ==
- Travelling post office, Queensland
