= Hughenden, Queensland =

Hughenden
- Town
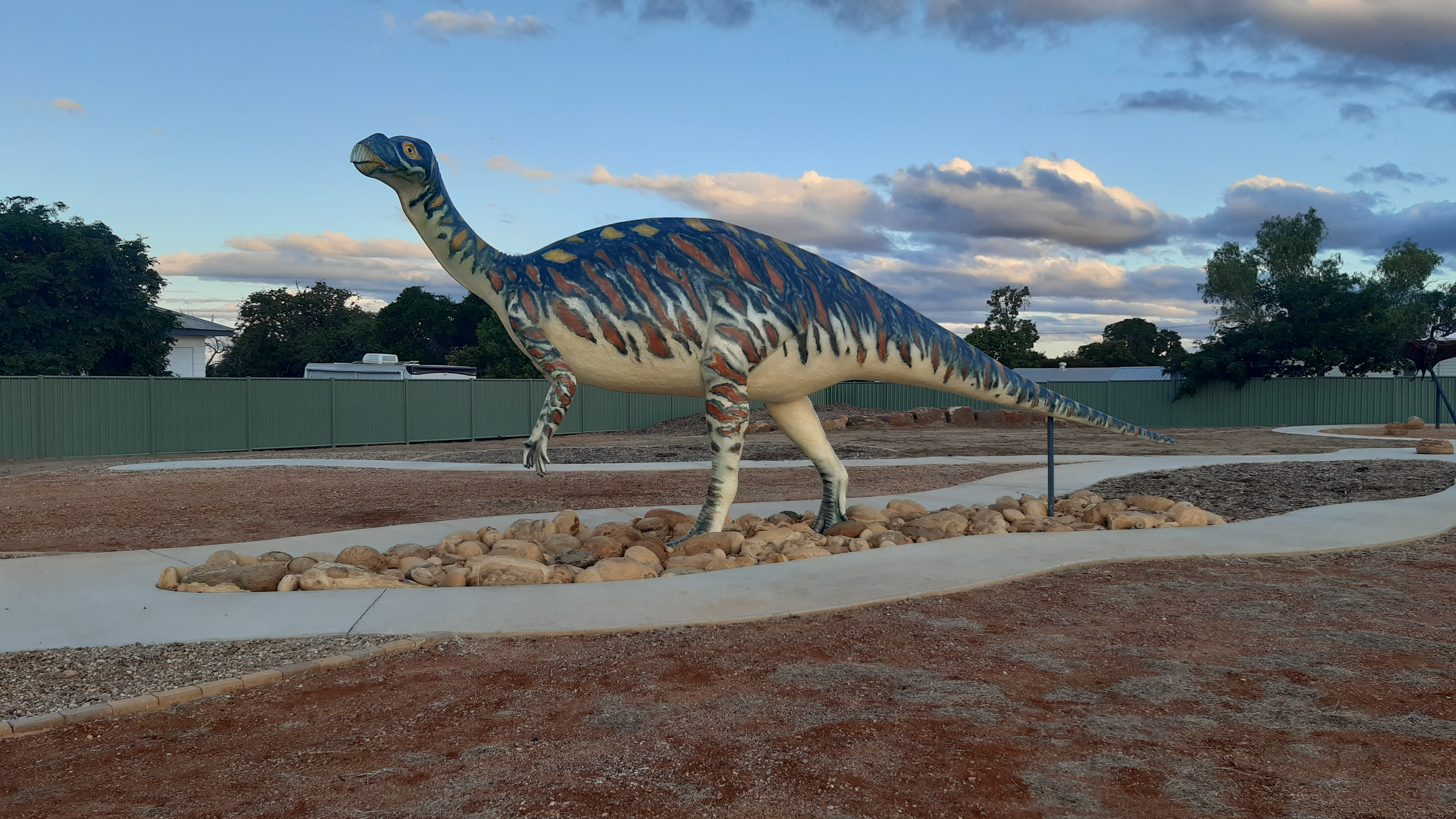
- Hughenden's dinosaur statue, occupying the site of the former Grand Hotel

- Interactive map of Hughenden
- Coordinates: 20.8438°S 144.1986°E
- Country: Australia
- State: Queensland
- LGA: Flinders Shire
- Location: 384 km (239 mi) WSW of Townsville; 521 km (324 mi) E of Mount Isa; 1,497 km (930 mi) NW of Brisbane; 248 km (154 mi) WSW of Charters Towers
- Established: 1870

Government
  - State electorate: Traeger
  - Federal division: Kennedy

Area
  - Total: 931.7 km^{2} (359.7 sq mi)
- Elevation: 324.0 m (1,063.0 ft)

Population
  - Total: 1,113 (2021 census)
  - Density: 1.1946/km^{2} (3.0940/sq mi)
- Time zone: UTC+10:00 (AEST)
- Postcode: 4821
- County: Douglas
- Mean max temp: 31.6 °C (88.9 °F)
- Mean min temp: 16.6 °C (61.9 °F)
- Annual rainfall: 491.3 mm (19.34 in)
Localities around Hughenden
Dutton River	Dutton River	Porcupine
Marathon	Hughenden	Prairie
Stamford	Tangorin	Prairie

Hughenden (/hjuːəndən/) is a rural town and locality in the Flinders Shire, Queensland, Australia. It is the seat of the Flinders Shire. In the 2021 census, the locality of Hughenden had a population of 1,113 people.

== Geography ==
Hughenden is situated on the banks of the Flinders River.

Hughenden has the following mountains (from west to east):

- Mount Walker (20.9513°S 144.2138°E) 472 metres (1,549 ft)
- Mount Mowbray (20.9523°S 144.2380°E) 403 metres (1,322 ft)
- Mount Devlin (20.9558°S 144.2726°E) 459 metres (1,506 ft)
- Mount Castor (20.9674°S 144.3042°E) 403 metres (1,322 ft)
- Mount Beckford (20.8136°S 144.3127°E) 419 metres (1,375 ft)

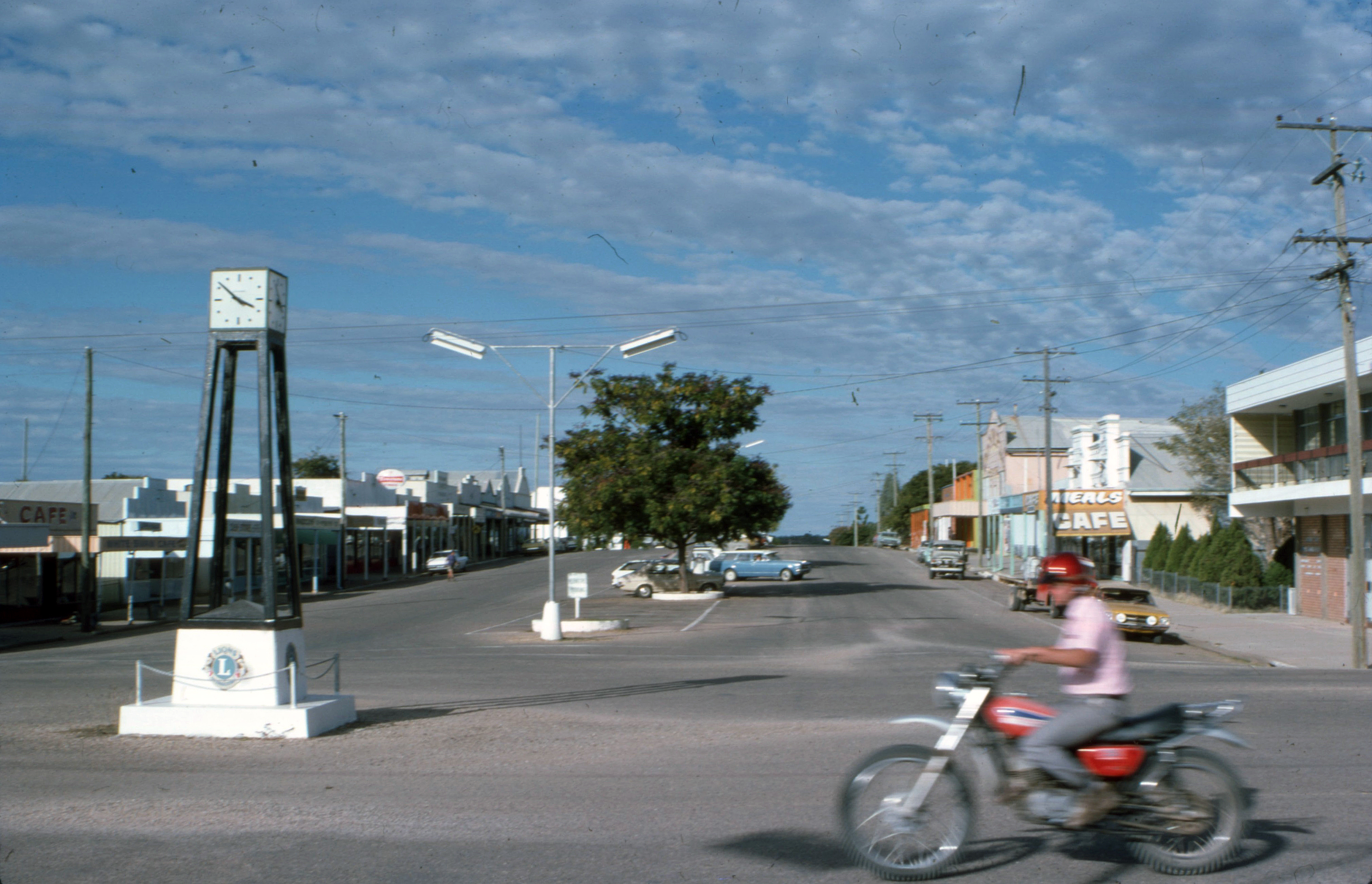
Looking eastwards up Brodie Street, the main street in Hughenden, in 1976

Hughenden is located on the Flinders Highway, 376 kilometres (234 mi) west of Townsville and 1,400 kilometres (870 mi) north-west of Brisbane, the state capital. The region around Hughenden is a major centre for the grazing of sheep and cattle. The main feed is annual grasses known as Flinders grass, which grow rapidly on the (by Australian standards) fertile grey or brown cracking clay soils after rain between November and March. However, because the rainfall is extremely erratic – at Hughenden itself it has ranged from 126 millimetres (5 in) in 1926 to 1,051 millimetres (41 in) in 1950 – droughts and floods are normal and stock numbers fluctuate greatly.

The runoff from the Flinders River is much too erratic to provide a sustainable supply for any crop-growing via irrigation.

Hughenden is on the Great Northern railway line with a number of railway stops in the locality (from west to east):

- Ballindalloch railway station, now abandoned (20.8602°S 144.1429°E)
- Hughenden West railway station, now abandoned (20.8570°S 144.1933°E
- Hughenden railway station, serving the town (20.8479°S 144.1972°E)
- Hughenden East railway station, now abandoned (20.8643°S 144.2066°E)
- Pooroga railway station, now abandoned (20.8731°S 144.2820°E)

Hughenden was a terminus for the former Hughenden-Winton railway line with the following rail stops in the locality (north to south):

- Dividing Siding railway siding point, now abandoned (20.9692°S 144.0978°E)
- Watten railway station, now abandoned (21.0131°S 144.0595°E)

Hughenden Airport is to the north-east of the town (20.8126°S 144.2250°E).

== History ==
The upper Flinders River area has been occupied by the Yirandhali people from around 11,000 years ago. Jirandali (also known as Yirandali, Warungu, Yirandhali) is an Australian Aboriginal language of North-West Queensland, particularly the Hughenden area. The language region includes the local government area of the Shire of Flinders, including Dutton River, Flinders River, Mount Sturgeon, Caledonia, Richmond, Corfield, Winton, Torrens, Tower Hill, Landsborough Creek, Lammermoor Station, Hughenden, and Tangorin.

Dalleburra (also known as Dalebura, Dal-leyburra, Yirandali) is a language of North-West Queensland, particularly Lammermoor Station via Hughenden. The Dalleburra language region includes the local government boundaries of the Flinders Shire Council.

The region in the vicinity of Hughenden was originally known as Mokana in the Yirandhali language.

British occupation began in October 1861 with the expedition group led by Frederick Walker camping near the site of the future township of Hughenden. Pastoralists soon followed and in 1863. Ernest Henry and his cousin Robert Gray established the Hughenden sheep station. Hughenden was named after Hughenden Manor in Buckinghamshire, England, the home of former British Prime Minister Benjamin Disraeli. Robert Gray and Ernest Henry both had a family connection with Hughenden Manor. Their grandfather, John Norris owned the property until it was sold to Disraeli on Norris's death. It was also owned by John's father, also named John Norris, a wealthy merchant and member of the famous Hellfire Club.

The actual town of Hughenden began in 1870 as a barracks for the paramilitary Native Police with sub-Inspector Harry Finch and his six troopers constructing the simple buildings at the junction of Station Creek with the Flinders River. In 1877, William Mark built a pub near the barracks and in August of that year the township site was officially surveyed and allotments made available for purchase.

Hughenden Post Office opened on 1 July 1878 (a receiving office had been open from 1874).

Hughenden Provisional School opened on 22 April 1880, becoming Hughenden State School in 1884. On 30 January 1968, it was expanded to have a secondary department.

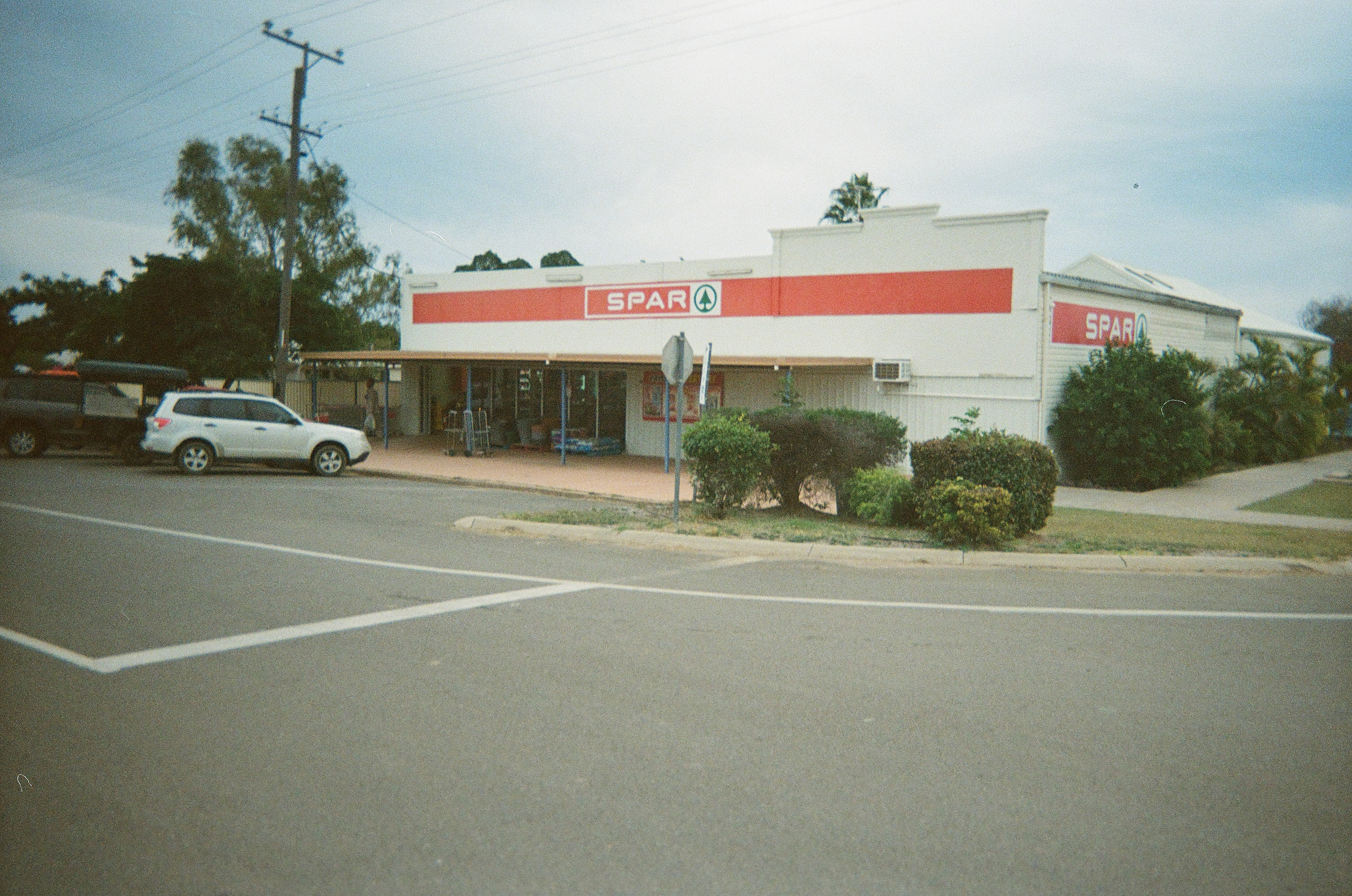
Hughenden's main supermarket, Spar, pictured in 2025

In November 1883, "Hughenden West Estate" made up of 37 allotments were advertised to be auctioned by Wilson, Ayton and Ryan of Townsville. A map advertising the auction states the allotments are charmingly situated on high sloping ground, overlooking the Town of Hughenden, within a few minutes walk to the Post and Telegraph Offices, the Court House and the business centre of town. The map also states these residence sites only need the completion of the railway works to enormously increase its value.

Hughenden North Provisional School opened c. 1897, becoming Hughenden North State School on 1 January 1909. Due to low attendances, it closed in 1926.

St Francis' Catholic School was opened on 1 October 1900 by the Sisters of the Good Samaritan.

Torrens Creek near Hughenden is where the Americans stored explosives in World War II. The Americans didn't know of the dangerous bush fires out there. After they put out a fire they went back to camp thinking that the fire was out. However, the fire took hold again without them knowing. They then heard about twelve major explosions in succession; the explosions left craters twenty feet deep. Hot shrapnel covered a wide area and started more fires. In the townships, people said that buildings shook and windows broke, and some people were convinced that an air raid had occurred. Thousands of soldiers and civilians attacked the blaze in an attempt to stop it spreading to fuel dumps, but were unable to control it. When the fire got to the explosives it was so powerful it blew the Americans out of their trucks. Many buildings and shops got burnt down from the spreading fires. However the locals were able to save the post office. A police Constable from Torrens Creek Police was awarded the King's Medal of Bravery.

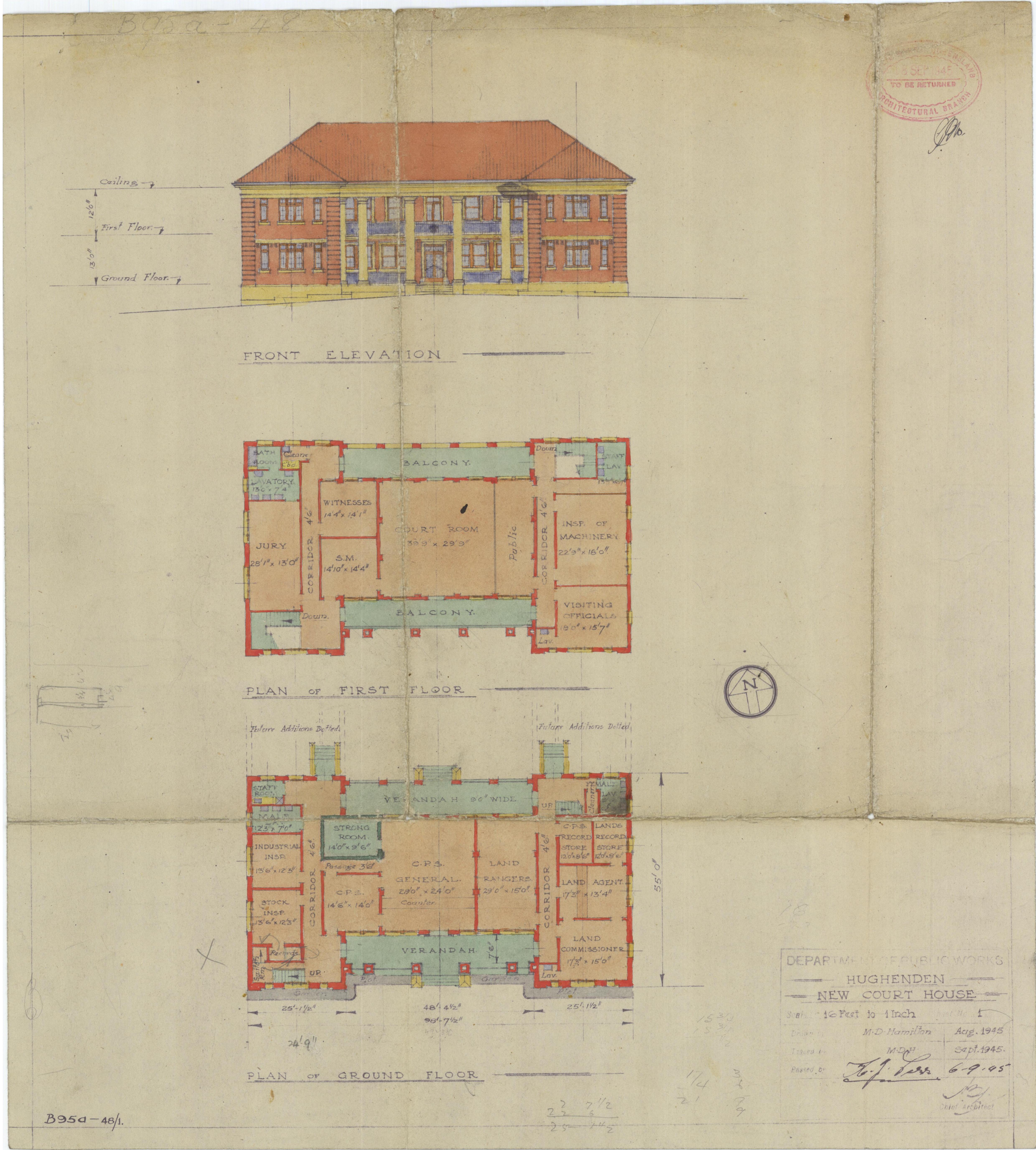
Architectural plans for the two-storey court house drawn up in 1945, a project which was abandoned when it was discovered that the foundations could not support a 2-storey building

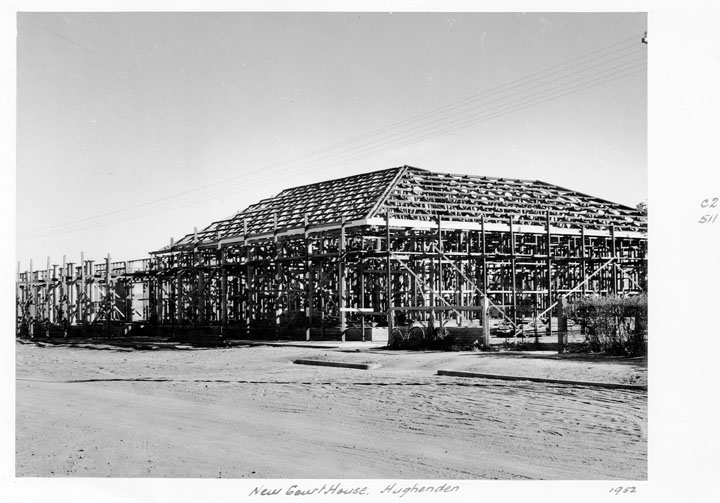
The partly-built one-storey court house, 1952

In June 1945, it was announced that a new court house would be built in Hughenden in the 1945–1946 financial year with architectural plans drawn up in August 1945. However, it was not until September 1946 that the Executive Council of the Queensland Government approved expenditure of £31,560 for the project. In September 1947, the project stopped because it was determined that the foundations would not support a 2-storey building and that the new court house would have to be redesigned as single-level building. In January 1950, the new plans for the one-storey building were announced and by October that year, the construction was progressing in "leaps and bounds". A shortage of cement appears to have delayed the project until 10,000 tons of cement was imported from England in January 1951. By January 1952, three-quarters of the framing had been completed while the project was suffering from a shortage of skilled labour and the cost having risen to an estimated £60,000. In October 1954 the court house was described as "almost completed", but it was not until 1955 that the court house opened.

The Indigenous land rights campaigner Eddie Mabo (1936–1992) spent time working on the railway in Hughenden in the late 1950s. As explained in his biography:

In 1959, at the age of twenty-three, Koiki Mabo took a job with a construction gang on the Queensland Railways at Hughenden in western Queensland. This was the beginning of his involvement with the working-class movement: 'I learnt quite a bit about trade unionism while in the railways because of the fellows at the Hughenden Railway Station.' He became a union representative on the Townsville-Mount Isa rail reconstruction project and encouraged other Islanders to join unions.

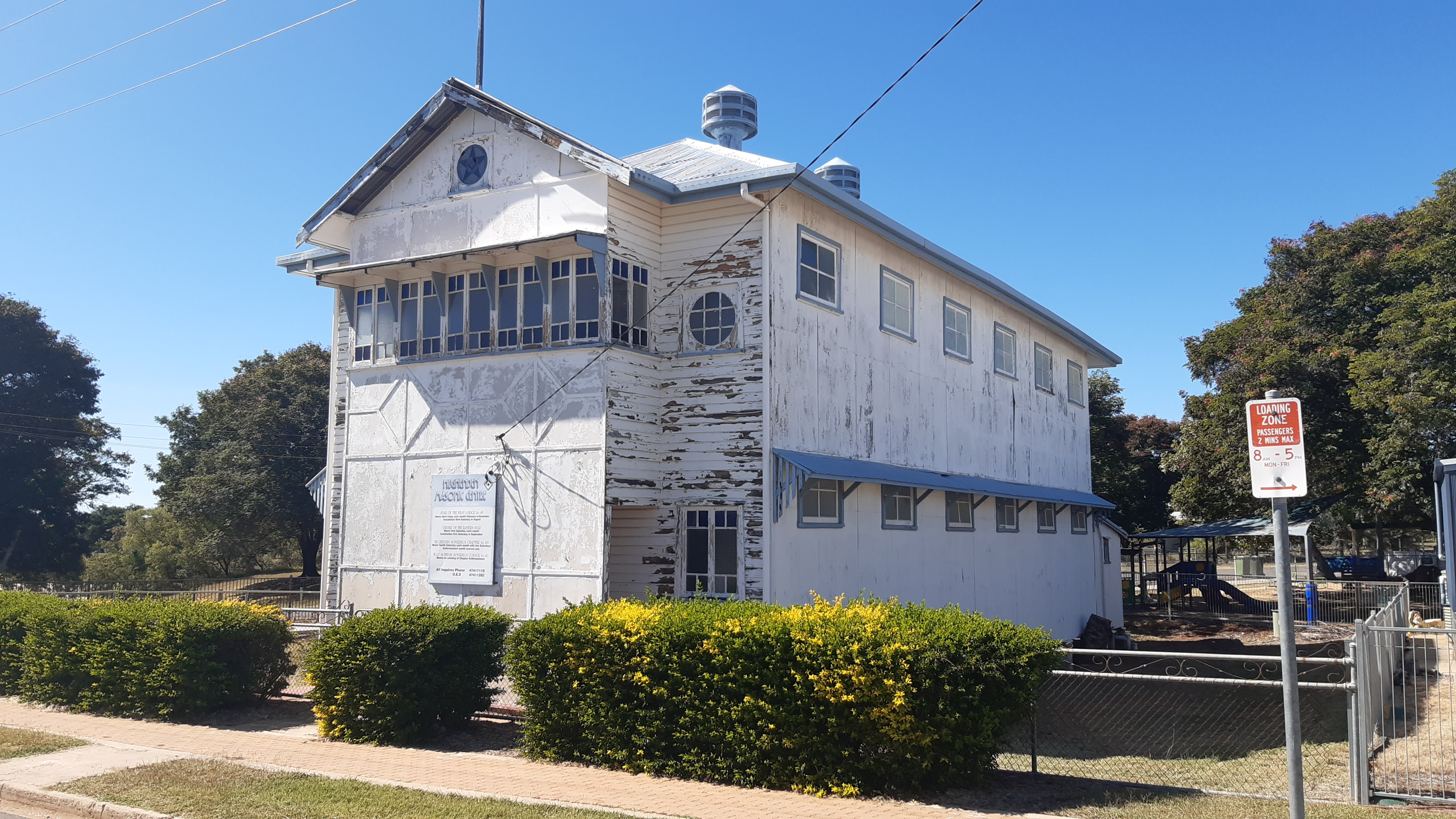
The Hughenden Masonic Centre on Gray Street in 2025

In 1960, the Hughenden branch of the Queensland Country Women's Association opened their hall.

On 9 June 2003 in the Queen's Birthday Honours List, Mrs Jean Eva Anderson of Ballater Station of Stamford was awarded the Medal of the Order of Australia for her "service to the community of Hughenden, particularly through the Country Womens Association". She had given 52 years of service to the Hughenden branch of the Queensland Country Women's Association. Her award was presented to her by the Governor of Queensland, Quentin Bryce.

In August 2008, Hughenden hosted the first Arid Lands Festival and The Great Hughenden Camel Endurance Challenge.

On Friday 16 November 2018, The Grand Hotel burnt to the ground during the night.

== Demographics ==
In the 2016 census, the locality of Hughenden had a population of 1,136 people.

In the 2021 census, the locality of Hughenden had a population of 1,113 people.

== Heritage listings ==
Hughenden has a number of heritage-listed sites, including:

- The Grand Hotel (destroyed by fire), 25 Gray Street (20.8443°S 144.2007°E)

== Education ==
Hughenden State School is a government primary and secondary (Prep–12) school for boys and girls at 12 Moran Street (20.8459°S 144.1965°E). In 2018, the school had an enrolment of 115 students with 15 teachers and 13 non-teaching staff (11 full-time equivalent).

St Francis Catholic School is a Catholic primary (Prep–6) school for boys and girls at 8 Flinders Street (20.8461°S 144.2020°E). In 2018, the school had an enrolment of 41 students with 4 teachers and 4 non-teaching staff (3 full-time equivalent).

== Amenities ==
The Flinders Shire Council operates the Flinders Shire Public Library at 39 Grey Street.

The Hughenden branch of the Queensland Country Women's Association has its rooms at 42 Stansfield Street.

Hughenden has a large range of sports on offer, including pony clubs, swimming, lawn bowls, golf, netball, tennis, campdrafting, rugby league, and gymnastics.

== Events ==
The town hosts the Hughenden Dinosaur Festival, which attracts tourists and includes entertainment and other events.

== Attractions ==
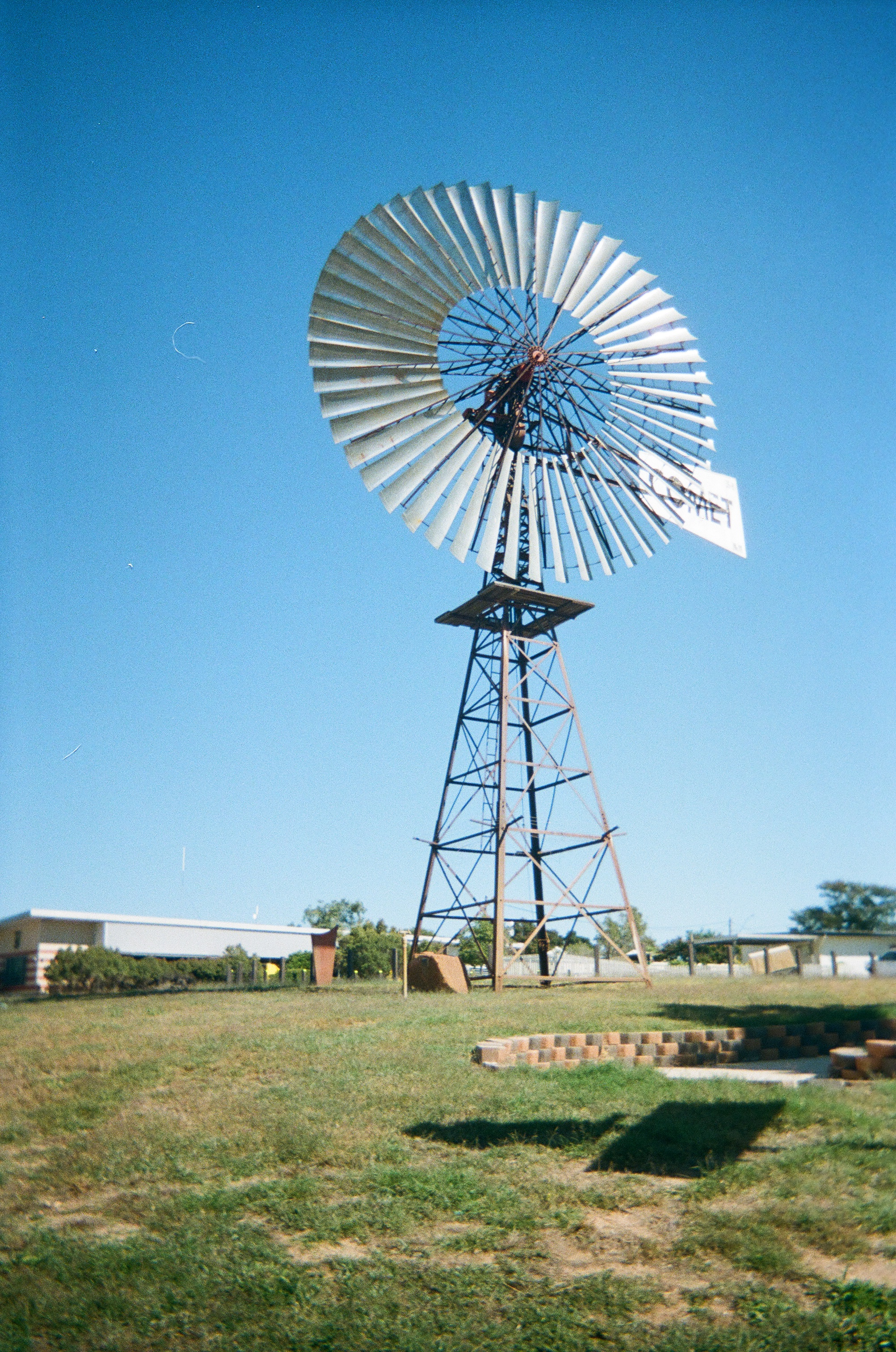
Wirilla Mill, the 35 foot Comet windpump in Hughenden which overlooks the Flinders River

Hughenden has a replica of the Muttaburrasaurus, a dinosaur, whose bones were discovered in 1963 near Muttaburra (220 kilometres (140 mi) by road from Hughenden) and some teeth and other bones were also discovered around Hughenden.

The Historic Coolabah Tree is a tourist attraction (20.8455°S 144.2050°E). Two expeditions searching for the lost Burke and Wills expedition left blazes on the tree. The search expeditions were led by Frederick Walker in 1861 and William Landsborough in 1862.

== Transport ==
- Hughenden Airport

Preceding station	Queensland Rail	Following station
Long distance rail services
Torrens Creek towards Townsville	The Inlander	Richmond towards Mount Isa

== Climate ==
Hughenden has a hot semi-arid climate (Köppen BSh). Record temperatures have varied from around 44 °C (111.2 °F) in the summer months to as low as −2 °C (28.4 °F) in winter, but average maximum temperatures are usually a very hot 36 °C (96.8 °F) in summer and a very warm 25 °C (77 °F) in June and July. Minimum temperatures range from 22 °C (72 °F) in summer to around 10 °C (50 °F) in winter. On average, a minimum below 2 °C (35.6 °F) is recorded once per year.

The average annual rainfall is around 490 millimetres (19 in), of which over three-quarters falls from November to March. Between May and September, rainfall is extremely rare: the median rainfall is zero in August, less than 2 millimetres (0.1 in) in July and September and less than 10 millimetres (0.4 in) in April, May, June and October. Variability is extreme, however, and totals as high as 800 millimetres (31 in) occur roughly one year in ten, whilst in the driest years as little as 127 millimetres (5 in) can be recorded. Between December and March, monthly totals can exceed 330 millimetres (13 in) if the monsoon is vigorous, with the wettest month being January 1984 with 659.7 millimetres (25.97 in).

Humidity is generally low except when the monsoon is active, when relatively lower temperatures accompany high humidity. The same applies to cloudiness: in the dry winter months over twenty days are completely clear.

Climate data for Hughenden Post Office
Month	Jan	Feb	Mar	Apr	May	Jun	Jul	Aug	Sep	Oct	Nov	Dec	Year
Record high °C (°F)	43.6 (110.5)	42.8 (109.0)	40.1 (104.2)	37.8 (100.0)	33.6 (92.5)	33.5 (92.3)	34.3 (93.7)	36.1 (97.0)	39.3 (102.7)	40.4 (104.7)	43.9 (111.0)	44.0 (111.2)	44.0 (111.2)
Mean daily maximum °C (°F)	35.8 (96.4)	34.7 (94.5)	33.7 (92.7)	31.4 (88.5)	27.9 (82.2)	25.0 (77.0)	25.0 (77.0)	27.5 (81.5)	31.1 (88.0)	34.5 (94.1)	36.1 (97.0)	36.9 (98.4)	31.6 (88.9)
Mean daily minimum °C (°F)	22.5 (72.5)	22.1 (71.8)	20.5 (68.9)	17.0 (62.6)	13.2 (55.8)	9.8 (49.6)	8.8 (47.8)	10.4 (50.7)	14.0 (57.2)	18.0 (64.4)	20.5 (68.9)	22.0 (71.6)	16.6 (61.9)
Record low °C (°F)	15.4 (59.7)	15.2 (59.4)	11.1 (52.0)	7.2 (45.0)	2.3 (36.1)	0.0 (32.0)	−2.0 (28.4)	−1.4 (29.5)	4.8 (40.6)	7.0 (44.6)	10.5 (50.9)	14.6 (58.3)	−2.0 (28.4)
Average rainfall mm (inches)	114.5 (4.51)	98.0 (3.86)	58.2 (2.29)	26.0 (1.02)	17.8 (0.70)	18.6 (0.73)	11.6 (0.46)	7.9 (0.31)	9.0 (0.35)	22.3 (0.88)	36.0 (1.42)	71.1 (2.80)	491 (19.33)
Average rainy days (≥ 0.2 mm)	8.2	7.6	4.7	2.3	1.8	1.8	1.4	0.9	1.3	2.7	4.3	6.0	43
Source: Bureau of Meteorology

== See also ==
- Porcupine Gorge National Park
- Kennedy Energy Park
