= Lawn Hill crater =

Eroded remnant of an impact crater in Queensland, Australia

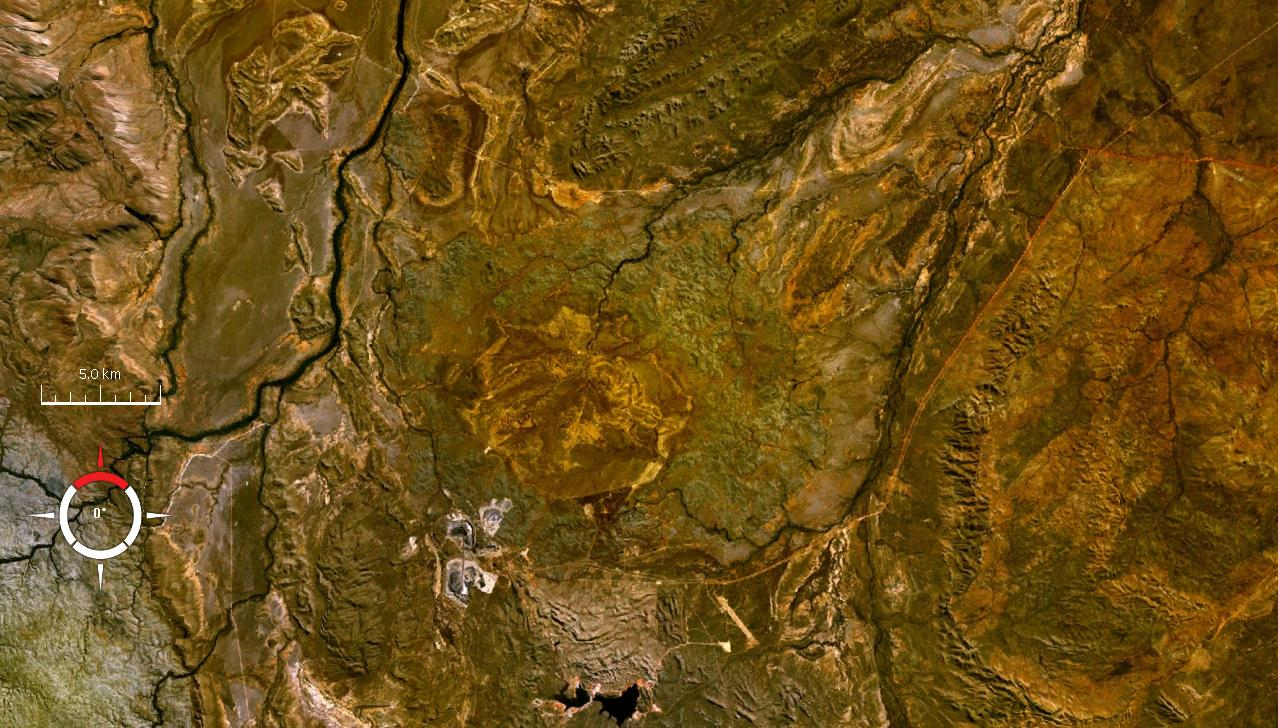
- Landsat image of Lawn Hill crater (circular feature in centre); screen capture from NASA World Wind

- Location within Queensland
- Location: Queensland, Australia; 18.667°S 138.63°E

Impact crater structure
- Confidence: Confirmed
- Diameter: 18 km (11 mi)
- Age: Ordovician
- Exposed: Yes
- Drilled: No

Lawn Hill ‘crater’ refers to an Ordovician impact structure, the eroded remnant of a former impact crater, situated approximately 220 km north-north-west of Mount Isa in northwestern Queensland, Australia. The site is marked by an 18 km diameter ring of dolomite hills. The origin of this circular feature was uncertain until the discovery of shatter cones and shocked quartz from uplifted rocks at the centre was reported in 1987.

== Description ==
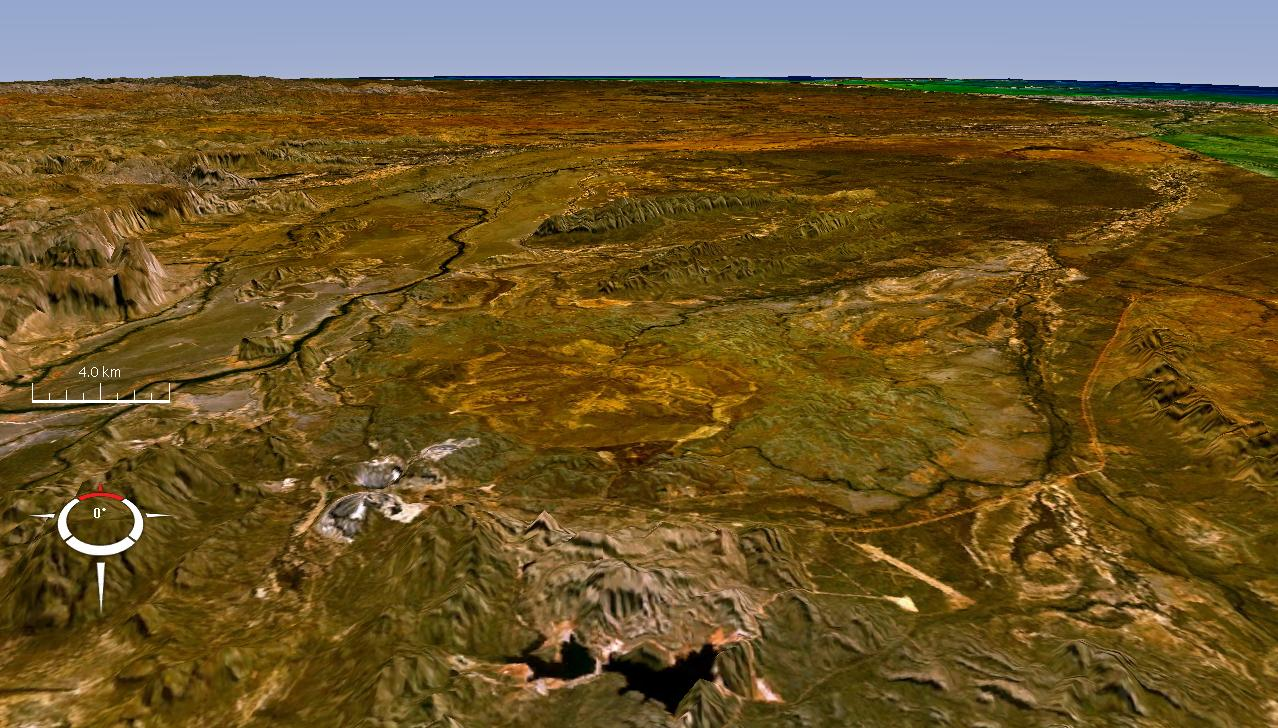
Oblique Landsat image draped over digital elevation model (x10 vertical exaggeration), Lawn Hill crater (circular depression in centre); screen capture from NASA World Wind

The site is eroded and it has been suggested that the original crater was slightly larger, at around 20 km diameter. In the past it has been debated whether the limestones, which are of Middle Cambrian age (ca. 510 Ma) based on comparisons with nearby outcrops of marine limestone in the Georgina Basin, were simply deposited in the crater after its formation, or were actually deformed by the impact event. Those differing points of view suggest that the crater may be of earlier Cambrian or Proterozoic age, or it could be of younger Paleozoic age. Although one recent study concluded that the impact most likely happened just before or even during the early stages of deposition of the limestone, suggesting an age of around 509–506 Ma (Middle Cambrian), the age of the impact structure is now thought to be Ordovician (ca. 472 Ma) based on 40Ar-39Ar dating of impact-related melt particles. The Georgina Basin was still an active depocenter at that time and the excellent preservation of the structure is attributed to burial by post-impact sedimentation.
