= Yirandhali language =

Extinct Australian Aboriginal language

Yirandhali
- Native to: Australia
- Region: Queensland
- Ethnicity: Yirandhali
- Extinct: by 1960s
- Language family: Pama–Nyungan: Maric ?; Yirandhali

Language codes
- ISO 639-3: ljw
- Glottolog: yira1239
- AIATSIS: L42

Yirandhali (Yirandali, Jirandali), also known as Pooroga, is an Australian Aboriginal language of Hughenden in Central Queensland. Yirandhali is a Pama–Nyungan language. Dixon (2002) speculates that it may belong in the Maric branch of that family, but further research is required before this can be verified, due to the limited lexical material that is available in the language.

There is very little information available about the languages of this region. Oral recounts suggest that the town area of Hughenden was a place that was passed through rather than a place that was used as a regular campsite. The Flinders River is often a dry river bed.

At the nearby Porcupine Gorge, in an area known locally as 'the Tattoos', there are signs of Aboriginal rock drawings. This area would have been a more reliable source of water.

== Classification ==
A Pama–Nyungan language, Dixon (2002) speculated that the language may belong in the Maric subfamily, and this is accepted in Bowern (2011), but this cannot be verified, due to the limited lexical material available.

== Phonology ==
One of the distinguishing features of the language is that every word ends with a vowel sound. For instance, the root word ŋamun (breast) common in other languages of the region has been incorporated in Yirandali as "ŋamuna".
