= Barkly Highway =

Highway in the Northern Territory and Queensland

Barkly Highway Northern Territory–Queensland
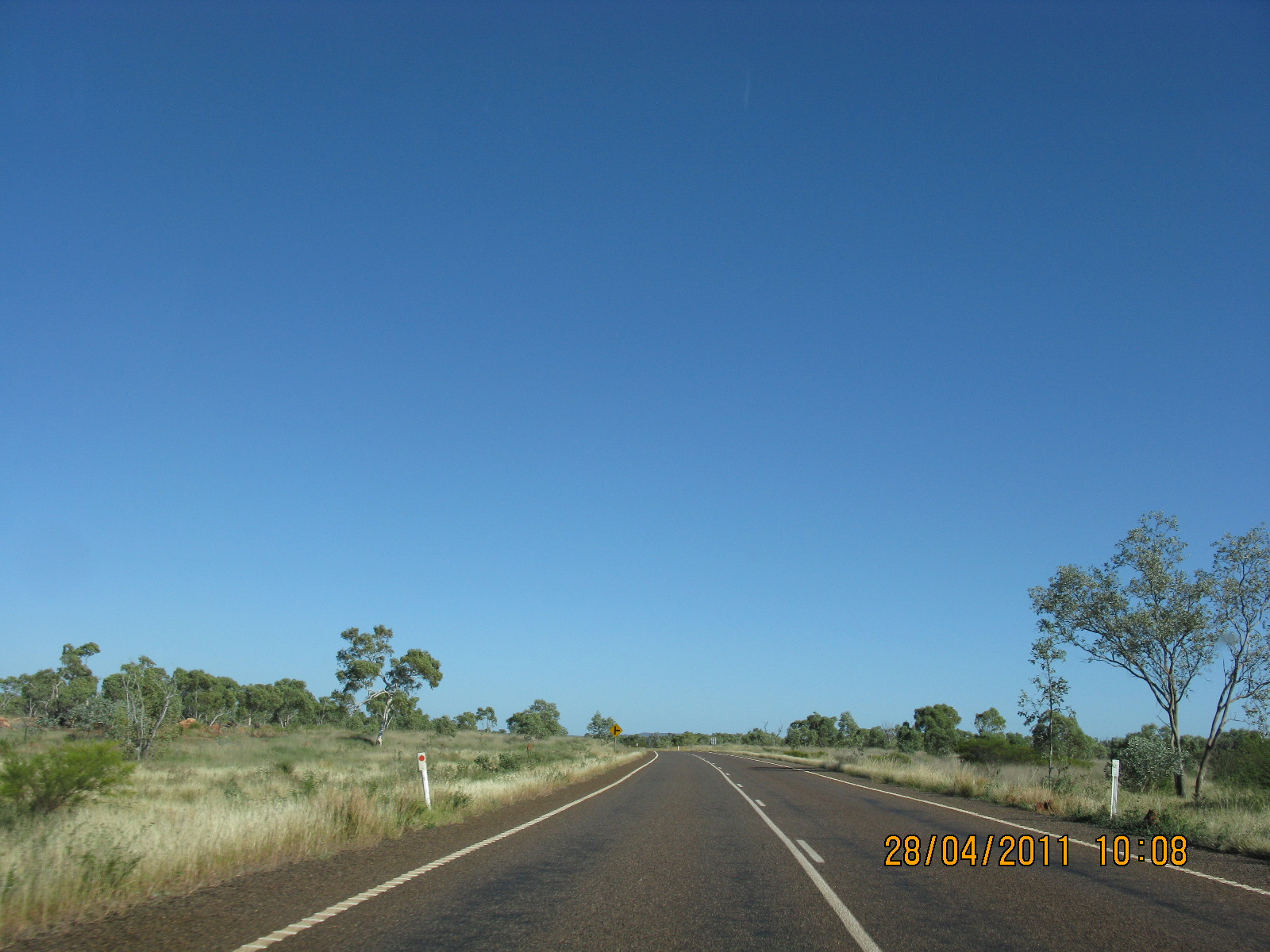
- Barkly Highway in Queensland

General information
- Type: Highway
- Length: 754 km (469 mi)
- Route number(s): National Highway 66 (Tennant Creek – NT/Qld Border; future route B66); National Highway A2 (NT/Qld Border – Cloncurry); National Route 83 (Mount Isa – Cloncurry)
- Former route number: National Highway 66 (Entire route); National Highway A2 (NT/Qld Border – Cloncurry)

Major junctions
- West end: Stuart Highway, Tennant Creek, Northern Territory
- Tablelands Highway (Northern Territory State Route 11); Diamantina Developmental Road (National Route 83); Burke Developmental Road (National Route 83)
- East end: Landsborough Highway, Cloncurry, Queensland, duplexed with Flinders Highway

Location(s)
- Major settlements: Camooweal, Mount Isa

Highway system
- Highways in Australia; National Highway • Freeways in Australia; Highways in the Northern Territory; Highways in Queensland

The Barkly Highway is a national highway in Queensland and the Northern Territory in Australia. It is the only sealed road between Queensland and the Northern Territory. The highway is named after the Barkly Tableland, which in turn was named by explorer William Landsborough in December 1861 after Henry Barkly, the then Governor of Victoria.

== Description ==
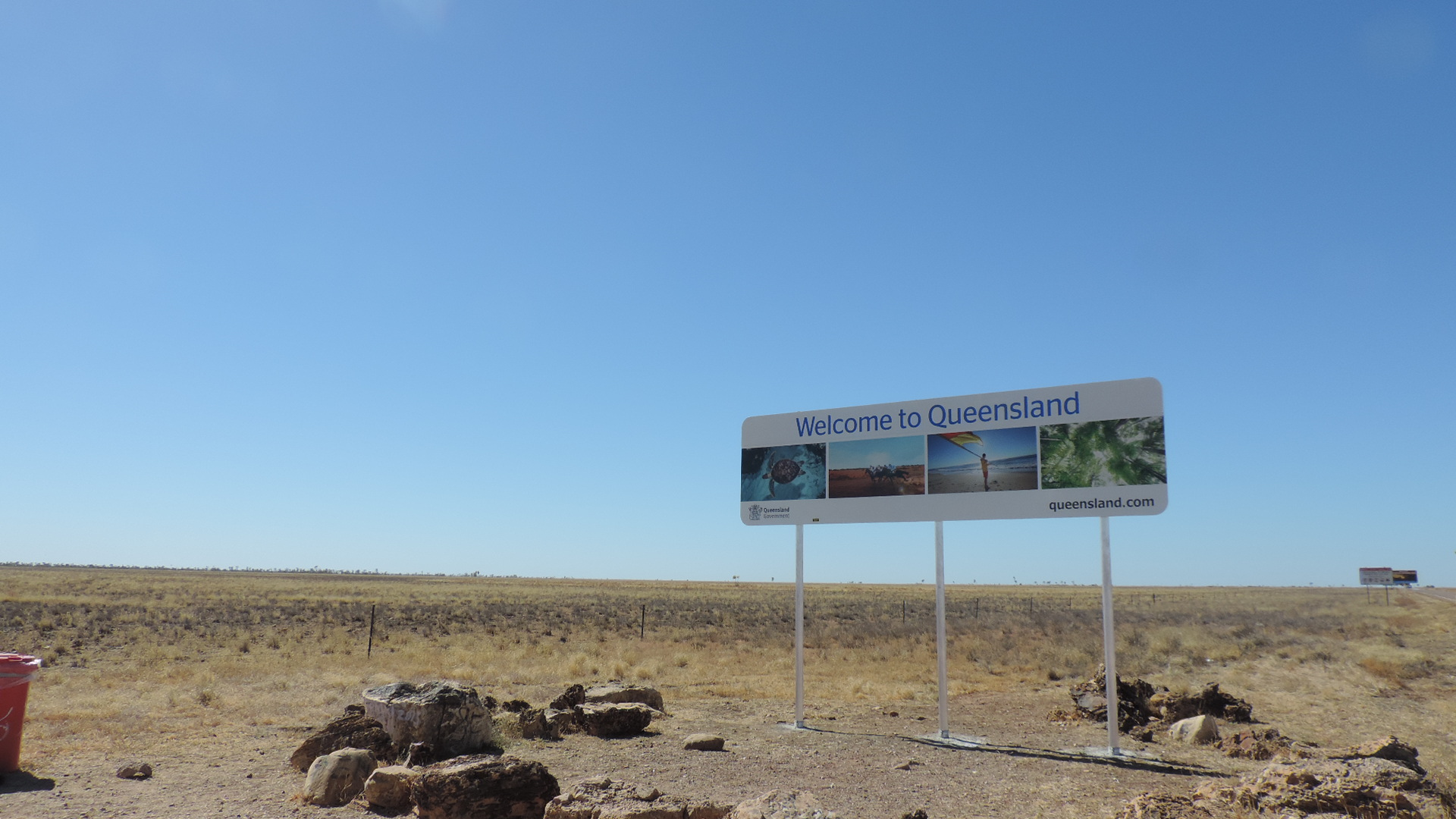
Entering Queensland, 2019

The highway runs between Cloncurry via Mount Isa and Camooweal to the Stuart Highway north of Tennant Creek, at the junction known as the "Threeways". The entire highway is part of the National Highway system: in the Northern Territory it is assigned National Route 66; the Queensland portion is designated as National Route A2.

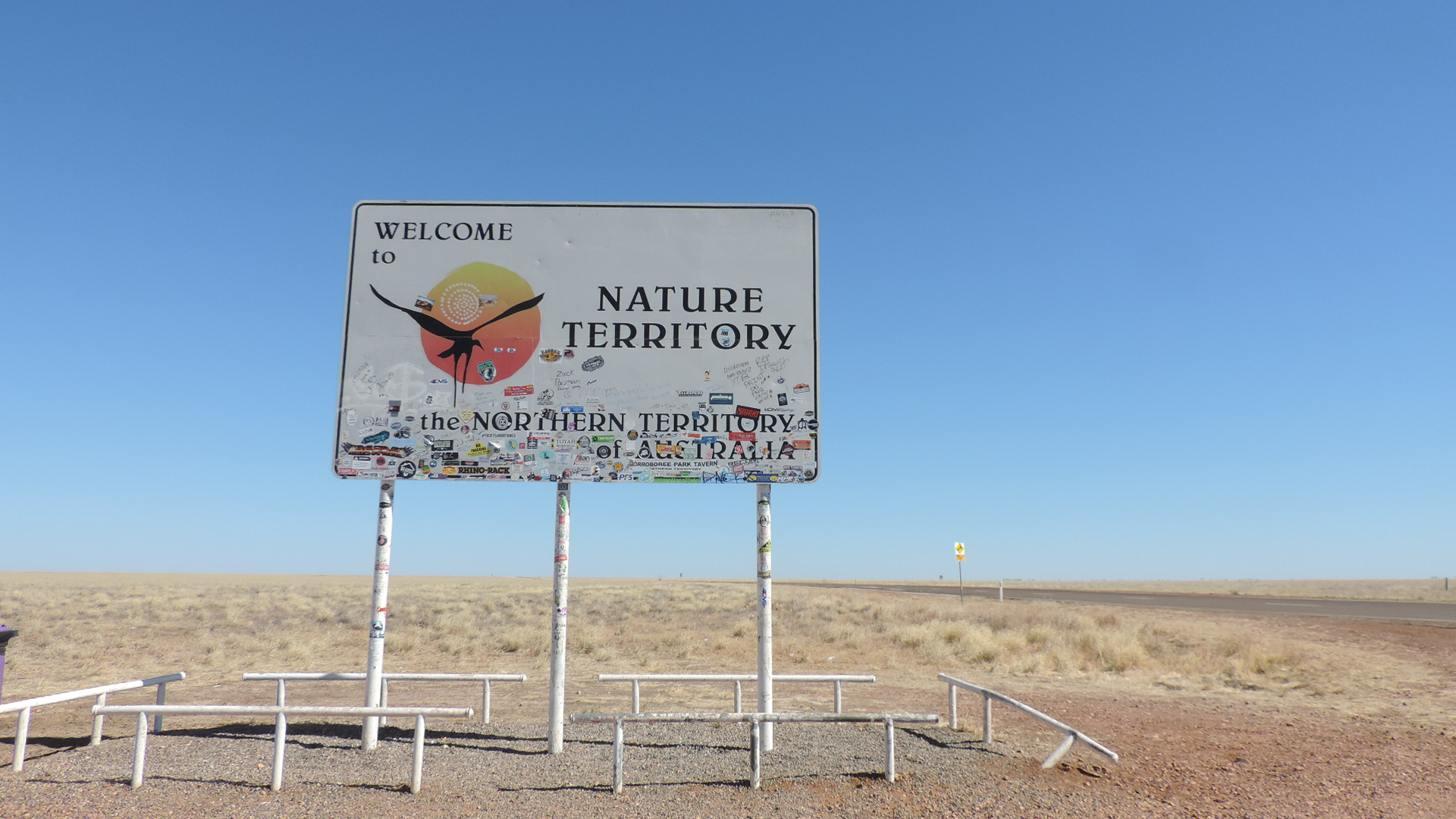
Entering the Northern Territory, 2019

The Northern Territory section has a speed limit of 130 kilometres per hour (81 mph) along most of its length.

As the only sealed road linking Queensland and the Northern Territory, it is the main transport route between them, consequently many road trains use it.

== Upgrades ==
An upgrade of the Queensland section of the highway between Mount Isa and Camooweal was completed in 2008 and despite floods of 2009, 2010 and 2011, the Queensland sections of road are in good condition (as of 2015).

The Northern Australia Roads Program announced in 2016 included the following project for the Barkly Highway.

=== Intersection upgrades ===
The project for intersection upgrades in Mount Isa urban area was completed in mid 2019 at a total cost of $8.3 million.

== Georgina River Bridge ==
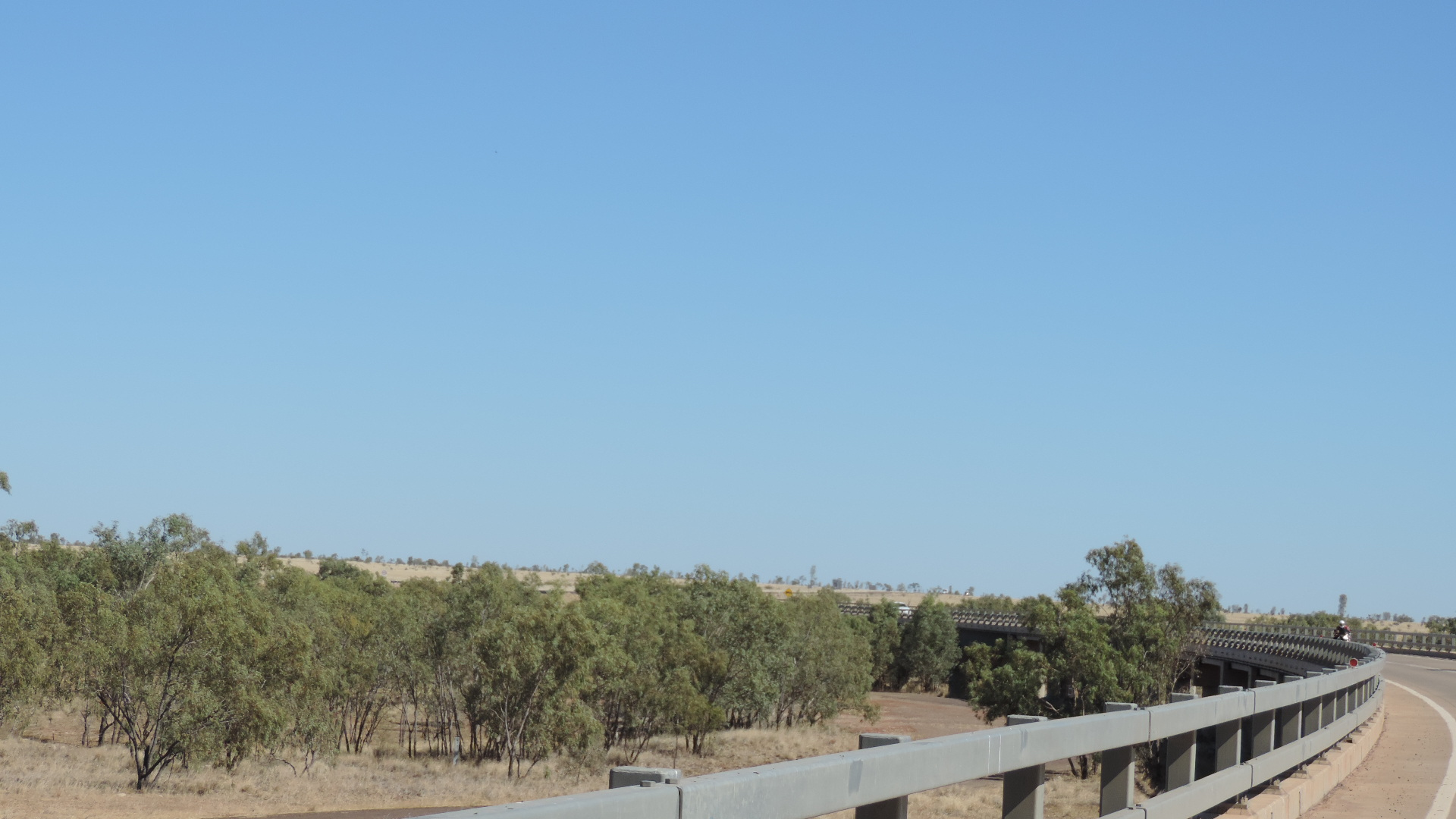
Georgina River Bridge (from Camooweal heading west), 2019

Given the economic importance of transport on this route, a longstanding problem was the flooding of the Georgina River immediately west of Camooweal in Queensland. As the water levels in the Georgina River vary enormously from being completely dry to flooding, the Barkly Highway bridge over the Georgina River was often unusable for many days due to flooding, with road trains and other heavy vehicles having to wait weeks before it was safe to cross. To alleviate these problems, the Georgina River Bridge was officially opened on 20 December 2002 by Senator Ron Boswell and Steve Breadhauer, Minister for Transport in the Queensland Government. It replaced the previous bridge which was approximately 50 metres (160 ft) south, and is both higher and longer so traffic on the highway can continue to cross during floods. The bridge is 417 metres (1,368 ft) long and is accompanied by a 5.6-kilometre (3.5 mi) highway deviation west from Camooweal. The bridge uses an unusual curved design to avoid placing pylons into the river bed which is culturally significant to the local Dugalunji people, who call the new bridge Ilaga Thuwani meaning The Camping Ground of the Rainbow Serpent.

Barkly Highway in Queensland and the Northern Territory (green and black)

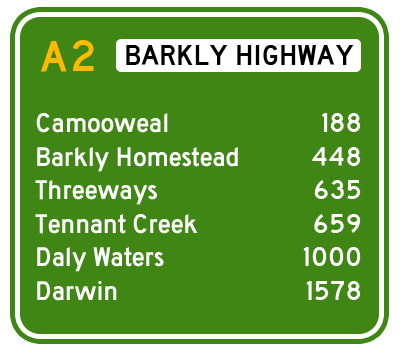
Approximate road distances (in kilometres) from Mount Isa westwards

== List of towns along the Barkly Highway ==
- Cloncurry
- Mount Isa
- Camooweal

== Major intersections ==
State	LGA	Location	km	mi	Destinations	Notes
Northern Territory	Barkly	Warumungu	0	0.0	Stuart Highway (National Highway 87) – north – Daly Waters south – Alice Springs	Barkly Highway western terminus – continues east as National Highway 66
Northern Territory	Barkly	Tablelands	186	116	Tablelands Highway (State Route 11) – north – Cape Crawford	
Northern Territory – Queensland state border			433	269	Northern Territory – Queensland state border	Barkly Highway continues east as National Highway A2
Queensland	Georgina River		445	277	Georgina River Bridge (Ilaga Thuwani Bridge)	
Queensland	Mount Isa	Camooweal	446	277	Camooweal Urandangie Road – south – Urandangi	
Queensland	Mount Isa	Camooweal	448	278	Gregory Downs Camooweal Road – north–east – Gregory, Burketown	
Queensland	Mount Isa	Mount Isa	635	395	Boulia Mount Isa Highway (Diamantina Developmental Road) (National Route 83) – south – Dajarra, Boulia	Barkly Highway continues east as National Highway A2 duplexed with National Route 83. Western concurrency terminus with National Route 83.
Queensland	Leichhardt River		635	395	Sir James Foots Bridge	
Queensland	Cloncurry	Cloncurry	754	469	Burke Developmental Road (National Route 83) – north – Normanton; Flinders Highway (Queensland Highway A6), duplexed with Landsborough Highway (National Highway A2) – Cloncurry, Julia Creek, Mckinlay	Eastern end of Barkly Highway. Eastern concurrency terminus with National Route 83.
1.000 mi = 1.609 km; 1.000 km = 0.621 mi: Concurrency terminus; Route transition

== See also ==
- Highways in Australia
- List of highways in the Northern Territory
- List of highways in Queensland
- List of highways numbered 66
