= Gilliat, Queensland =

Abandoned town in Queensland, Australia

Gilliat Queensland
- Coordinates: 20.6866°S 141.5011°E
- Postcode(s): 4823
- Time zone: AEST (UTC+10:00)
- Location: 29.9 km (19 mi) W of Julia Creek; 114 km (71 mi) E of Cloncurry; 235 km (146 mi) E of Mount Isa; 677 km (421 mi) WSW of Townsville; 1,659 km (1,031 mi) NW of Brisbane
- LGA(s): Shire of Mckinlay
- State electorate(s): Traeger
- Federal division(s): Kennedy

Gilliat is an abandoned outback town in the locality of Julia Creek in the Shire of Mckinlay, Queensland, Australia.

== Geography ==
The town is adjacent to the Gilliat railway station (20.6913°S 141.4992°E) on the Great Northern railway line.

As at 2020, there is only one building in the town (20.6899°S 141.5001°E).

== History ==
The area was originally traversed by Ludwig Leichhardt. The first Europeans to take advantage of the region’s pastoral potential were Duncan and Donald McIntyre. In 1862, these two men brought a substantial number of sheep into the area, but poor seasons, isolation and adverse weather conditions caused their venture to fail. Later, the area was explored in a more systematic way with permanent pastoral settlements such as Dalgonally and Lara being established.

The town of Gilliat was initially surveyed as a railway town on 17 November 1900 by James Stroud. The settlement was originally located adjacent to Eddington Station (20.6665°S 141.47608°E), on the road which crossed the eastern channel of the Gilliat River. However, the settlement was subsequently moved to its present site due to on-going flooding of the original site. The name Gilliat is said to be derived from a Mr Gilliat who had previously been sent from the Bowen River area to establish Lara Station.

The town of Gilliat is shown on a 1907 survey plan.

The town experienced intermittent growth and decline throughout its life. As with many other settlements in isolated areas, its viability was tied to the prosperity of the industries or commercial activity in the surrounding area. During its more prosperous times, the town had a telegraph office, situated at the point where the rail line crossed the Gilliat River. A postal receiving office was also opened in 1900, moving along with the town, to the railway site in around 1906. When the Gilliat railway station opened in 1909, a permanent post office was established, maintaining operations until 1973.

At the Queensland Country Women's Association annual conference in August 1930, the Gilliart branch proposed that the association should work to establish a school at Gilliat as there were 31 school-aged children in the district and the association voted to do so. Gilliart State School opened circa 1931 but closed circa 1934.

The town’s hotel was called the Eddington, which was originally established soon after the town’s formation, with Isobel Walters as the first licensee. This hotel eventually changed its name to the Eddington Arms and remained in business until 2000, with its closure effectively marking the end of the town. As well, Shell operated a depot here from around 1939 until its eventual de-commissioning.
