= Nelia, Queensland =

Nelia
- Town
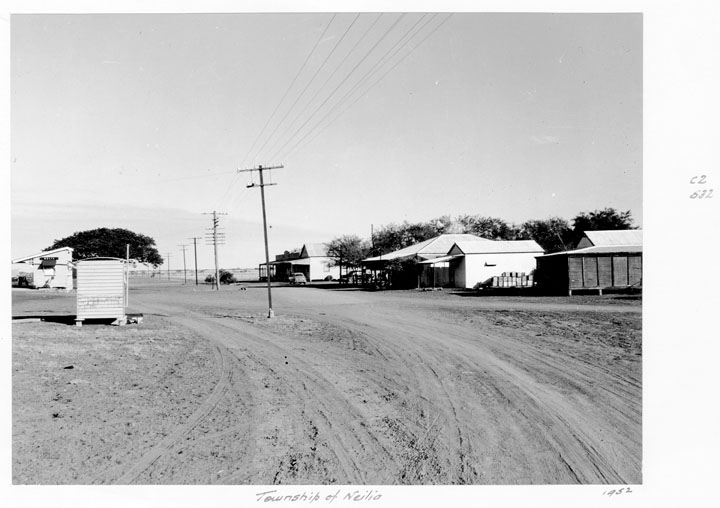
- Nelia, 1952

- Coordinates: 20.6533°S 142.2147°E
- Country: Australia
- State: Queensland
- LGA: Shire of McKinlay
- Location: 51 km (32 mi) E of Julia Creek; 308 km (191 mi) E of Mount Isa; 1,648 km (1,024 mi) NW of Brisbane

Government
  - State electorate: Traeger
  - Federal division: Kennedy
- Time zone: UTC+10:00 (AEST)
- Postcode: 4823

Nelia is an outback town in the locality of Julia Creek in the Shire of Mckinlay, Queensland, Australia.

== Geography ==
The town is just north off the Flinders Highway, 1,680 kilometres (1,040 mi) north west of the state capital, Brisbane.

The Inlander rail service from Townsville to Mount Isa on the Great Northern railway passes through Nelia, which is served by Nelia railway siding (20.6540°S 142.2134°E).

== History ==
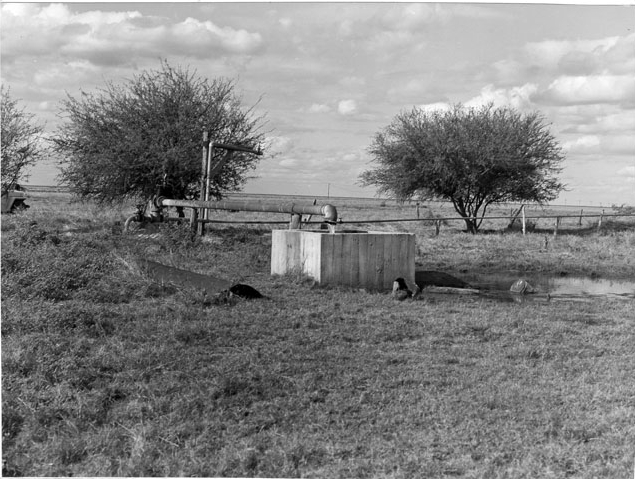
Nelia town bore, July 1955

The area was named by explorer William Landsborough after a friend of his wife. European settlement began in the 1870s with the establishment of the Willibah and Benannee runs.

Nelia Post Office opened on 23 June 1909 (a receiving office had been open from 1908).

A townsite was surveyed in 1912 and the first land sales took place in 1913.

Nelia State School opened on 4 May 1926 and closed in 1932. It reopened in 1953 and closed permanently in 1960.

An artesian bore was constructed in 1928 to provide water to the town. Due to not following government advice, the bore flowed suddenly and dramatically sending water in all directions.

The post office celebrated its centenary in 2009.

In February 2019 flooding damaged the railway line, resulting in the derailment of a Pacific National freight train with 81 wagons at Nelia. A 1.2-kilometre (0.75 mi) rail deviation was constructed around the derailment.

== Amenities ==
The Nelia branch of the Queensland Country Women's Association has its rooms at the QCWA Hall at 4 Main Street.

== Education ==
There are no schools in Nelia. The nearest government primary school is Julia Creek State School in the town of Julia Creek to the west. There are no nearby secondary schools; the alternatives are distance eductation and boarding school.
