= Landsborough Highway =

Highway in Queensland, Australia

Landsborough Highway Queensland
- Landsborough Highway (green on black)

General information
- Type: Highway
- Length: 1,049 km (652 mi)
- Route number(s): National Highway A2
- Former route number: National Highway 66; National Highway 71; National Highway A2

Major junctions
- SE end: Warrego Highway, (State Highway A2), Morven, Queensland
- Mitchell Highway (State Highway A71); Capricorn Highway (State Highway A4); Kennedy Developmental Road (State Route 62); Flinders Highway (State Highway A6)
- NW end: Barkly Highway, (National Highway A2), Cloncurry, Queensland

Location(s)
- Major settlements: Augathella, Blackall, Barcaldine, Longreach, Winton

Highway system
- Highways in Australia; National Highway • Freeways in Australia; Highways in Queensland

Landsborough Highway is a highway in western Queensland, Australia, running in the northwest–southeast direction from Morven to Cloncurry. The Landsborough Highway runs through vast tracts of land that was once occupied by William Landsborough, an Australian explorer of the 19th century. It is also the central part of the tourist route known as the Matilda Way after the popular Australian song Waltzing Matilda, which extends from Bourke in central northern New South Wales to Karumba on the Gulf of Carpentaria.

The entire highway is an important part of the National Highway system linking Darwin and Brisbane: formerly National Route 66 (Cloncurry to Barcaldine) and National Route 71 (Barcaldine to Augathella), Queensland began to convert to the alphanumeric system much of Australia had adopted in the early-2000s and is now designated as National Route A2. Its importance also stems from the fact that it is the only sealed link between Flinders Highway and Capricorn Highway apart from Gregory Development Road between Emerald and Charters Towers.

The highway services an important sheep and cattle grazing region, tourist traffic and local properties. The highway is fully sealed but with many sections of substandard width and quality. It is also flood-prone with lengthy closures during floods.

== Northern Australia Roads Program upgrade ==
The Northern Australia Roads Program announced in 2016 included the following project for the Landsborough Highway.

=== Pavement widening and strengthening ===
The project for pavement widening and strengthening between Longreach and Winton (Package 1) was completed in early 2020 at a total cost of $27 million.

== Roads of strategic importance upgrade ==
The Roads of Strategic Importance initiative, last updated in March 2022, included the following project for the Landsborough Highway.

=== Corridor upgrade ===
A lead project to upgrade the Mount Isa to Rockhampton corridor, including sections of the Landsborough and Capricorn Highways and surrounding state and council roads, at an estimated cost of $237.5 million, was in the planning and scoping stage. Works are expected to include progressive sealing, lane duplications and crossing upgrades.

== Other upgrades ==
=== Pavement strengthening and widening ===
A project to strengthen and widen pavement 7 kilometres (4.3 mi) north of Winton, at a cost of $4 million, was completed in June 2021.

A project to strengthen and widen pavement 23 kilometres (14 mi) north-west of Winton, at a cost of $6 million, was completed in December 2021.

== Towns ==
Towns along the highway are listed below:

- Augathella
- Tambo
- Blackall
- Barcaldine
- Longreach
- Winton
- Kynuna
- McKinlay
- Cloncurry

== Major intersections ==
| LGA | Location | km | mi | Destinations | Notes |
|---|---|---|---|---|---|
| Murweh | Morven | 0 | 0.0 | Warrego Highway (State Route A2) – east – Morven / Mitchell / Warrego Highway (Alternate State Route A2) – west – Charleville | Southern end of Landsborough Highway (National Route A2) |
| Murweh | Augathella | 83.2 | 51.7 | Mitchell Highway (State Route A71 / Alternate State Route A2) – south–west – Charleville | |
| Barcaldine | Barcaldine | 413.2 | 256.8 | Capricorn Highway (State Route A4) – east – Emerald | |
| Longreach | Longreach | 521.2 | 323.9 | Thomson Developmental Road (See Notes column) – south – Windorah | Thomson Developmental Road is part of a former proposed National Route 79 from Melbourne to Longreach. This route is now signed as M79/A79 from Melbourne to Mildura, then B79 to Broken Hill, beyond which there is no signed number. |
| Winton | Winton | 699.2 | 434.5 | Kennedy Developmental Road (State Route 62) – north – Hughenden | Eastern concurrency terminus with Kennedy Developmental Road |
| Winton | Corfield | 705.1 | 438.1 | Kennedy Developmental Road (State Route 62) – west – Boulia | Western concurrency terminus with Kennedy Developmental Road |
| McKinlay | Kynuna | 859.1 | 533.8 | Julia Creek Kynuna Road (State Route 84) – north – Julia Creek | |
| Cloncurry | Cloncurry | 1,033.1 | 641.9 | Flinders Highway (State Route A6) – west – Cloncurry / east – Julia Creek | Eastern concurrency terminus with Flinders Highway |
| Cloncurry | Cloncurry | 1,048.9 | 651.8 | Barkly Highway (National Route A2) – west – Mount Isa / Burke Developmental Road (State Route 83) – north – Normanton | Western concurrency terminus with Flinders Highway. Northern end of Landsborough Highway. |
1.000 mi = 1.609 km; 1.000 km = 0.621 mi: Concurrency terminus

== See also ==
- Highways in Australia
- List of highways in Queensland
