= Trepell Airport =

- IATA: TQP; ICAO: YTEE

Summary
- Airport type: Private
- Operator: South32
- Location: Trepell
- Elevation AMSL: 891 ft (272 m)
- Coordinates: 21°50′06″S 140°53′17″E

Map
- Location in Queensland

Runways
Direction	Length		Surface
Direction	m	ft	Surface
14/32	1,800	5,906	Asphalt
- Sources: Australian AIP and aerodrome chart

Trepell Airport (IATA: TQP, ICAO: YTEE) is located south-west of McKinlay, Queensland, Australia. The private airport is adjacent to 'South32 Cannington', Australia's largest single-mine producer of silver and lead. Beside the airport and mine is a small residential camp that assists with fly-in fly-out (FIFO) workers.

== Airlines and destinations ==
Airlines	Destinations
Alliance Airlines	Mining charter: Brisbane, Cairns, Townsville

== See also ==
- List of airports in Queensland
