= Dirt n Dust Festival =

Australian festival to celebrate music and sportsmanship

- Status: Active
- Genre: Festival
- Frequency: Annually
- Locations: Julia Creek, Queensland
- Country: Australia
- Years active: 32
- Inaugurated: 1994
- Participants: 1,000
- Attendance: 3,500
- Capacity: 5,000
- Website: dirtndust.com

The Dirt n Dust Festival is an annual sporting and music festival held in the rural town of Julia Creek, 646 kilometres (401.4 mi) west of Townsville, Queensland, Australia. It was one of the biggest annual events of its type in Queensland.

The festival takes place over a three-day weekend in April each year.

== History ==
In previous years it has featured triathlon, horse races, bull rides, bog snorkelling, Australia's Best Butt Competition and live country music artists. The triathlon was known as one of the toughest triathlons in Australia, particularly because of its tough conditions. About 3,500 patrons attended annually over the weekend.

The triathlon was the festival's main event. It featured an 800-metre creek swim, a 25-kilometre bike ride on the Flinders Highway and a five-kilometre run around the town. The triathlon was won five times by Brisbane triathlete Sam Betten. World-renowned triathletes like Brad Bevan, Courtney Atkinson, Loretta Harrop and Emma Jackson have also competed in the event.

The event previously received funding under Tourism and Events Queensland's Regional Development Program.

Due to the coronavirus pandemic, the 2020 and 2021 festivals were cancelled.

In July 2021, it was announced that due to a lack of volunteers and there being no committee to run the event, the Dirt N Dust Festival would be permanently discontinued and there would be no more festivals held. This decision was reversed two months later with the announcement of a new volunteer committee taking over the organisation of the festival for its return in 2022.

In line with the community vision, the revived 2022 festival, with changes to the event line-up seeing the Triathlon replaced with an Adventure Run and the Bull Ride extended to the Dirt n Dust Rodeo.

== Next event ==
The next event will be held in 2027.

== See also ==
- List of festivals in Australia
