= Duncan McIntyre (explorer) =

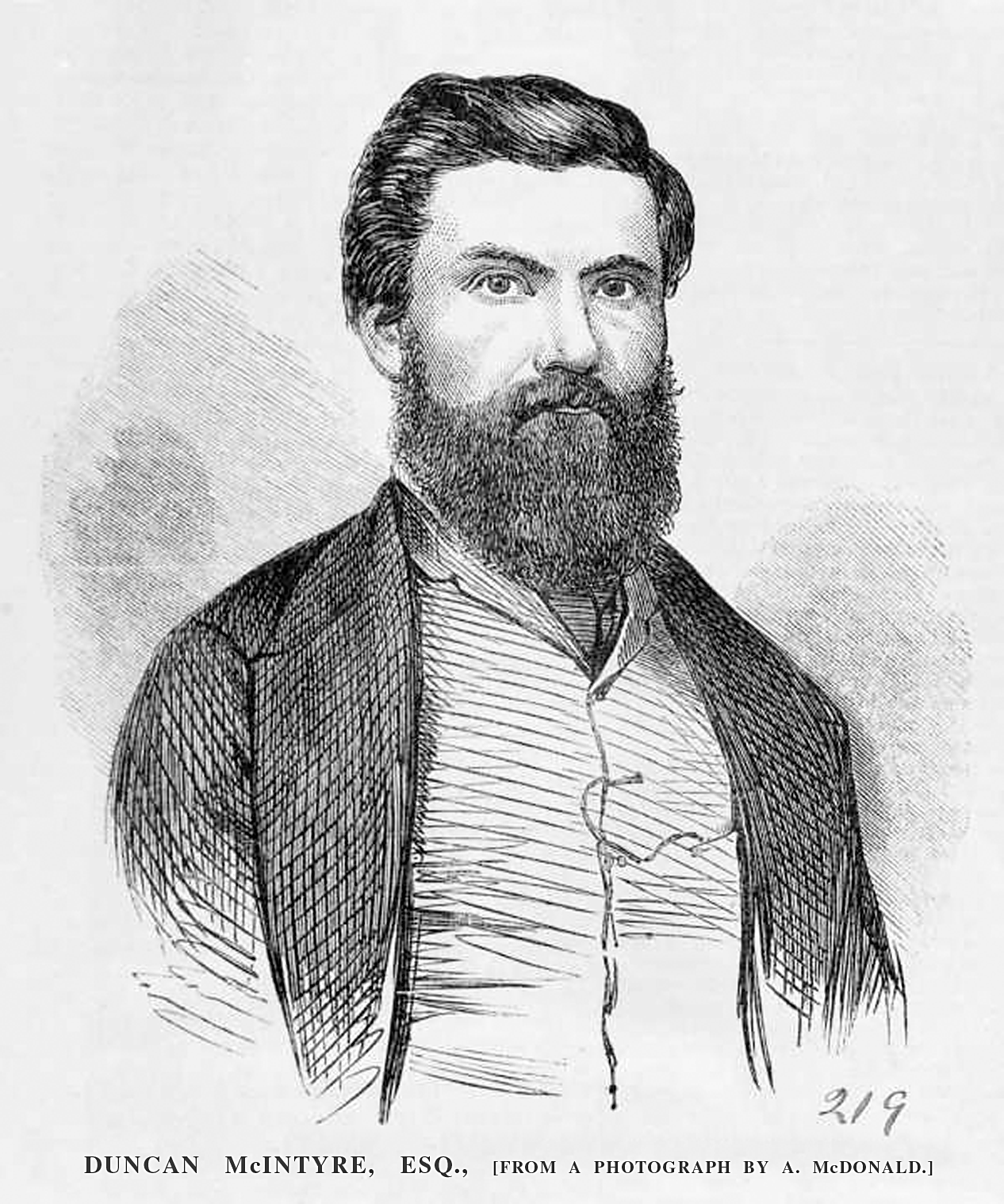
McIntyre, 1865

Duncan McIntyre was an Australian explorer who followed in the tracks of Burke and Wills. In 1864 he laid claim to the property now called Dalgonally in North-West Queensland, and found evidence of Ludwig Leichhardt's final expedition. He subsequently led a party in search of Leichhardt, but died of fever during the search.

== Early years ==
Duncan McIntyre was born in Scotland in 1831. He was the fifth child of James McIntyre and his wife Mary, they were a Gaelic agricultural based society. In 1839, he came to Australia with his father's eldest brother, Archibald, his Aunt Elizabeth and five of their children. A sixth child, Donald (who later settled on Dalgonally Station) stayed behind in Scotland and did not rejoin the family until 1851.

Only sketchy details are known of McIntyre's youth. He married Mary Morris in Melbourne on 5 March 1862. At the time he was superintendent of Glengower, a property near Castlemaine owned by Donald Campbell, a brother of his Aunt Elizabeth.

== Evidence of Leichhardt ==
In mid-1863 Donald Campbell financed a land-seeking expedition with McIntyre as leader. The impetus came from William Landsborough’s description of the Flinders River country in North-West Queensland. Landsborough had passed through the Flinders region in 1862 while searching for the explorers, Burke and Wills.

McIntyre's party left Glengower and made for Mount Murchison (near modern-day Wilcannia) on the Darling River, and then for Cooper Creek. The party consisted of Duncan McIntyre (leader), William Frederic Barnett (second in command), Albert, Charlie and Billy (aboriginals), and 25 horses and one kangaroo dog. From Cooper Creek to the Gulf of Carpentaria they followed the general direction Burke and Wills had taken in 1860. They returned from the Gulf following Landsborough's route along the Flinders River and then south along the Thomson River, and other rivers, to the Darling River. The entire journey lasted five months.

Duncan McIntyre was successful in finding suitable grazing land near the Flinders River – it became known as Dalgonally – and he found something else of significant historical interest: evidence of Ludwig Leichhardt's third, and final, expedition of 1848 from which Leichhardt never returned. McIntyre sent a telegram to the Royal Society of Victoria from Swan Hill, the first telegraph station he reached on his way back to Glengower:

15 December 1864
Found between Burke and Sturt tracks about 200 miles from Carpentaria two old horses, and saw very old tracks of a party going south west. Also two trees marked L about 15 years old.

== Leichhardt Search Committee ==
When it became known that McIntyre had found evidence of Leichhardt, a group of Melbourne society ladies formed a committee, the Leichhardt Search Committee, and sought contributions for a new search. McIntyre was appointed leader, probably in May 1865, though he was unaware of his appointment – he was in the Queensland bush buying cattle to stock Dalgonally. With McIntyre somewhere in Queensland – and still oblivious of his new role as leader – the Leichhardt search party left Glengower on Monday, 3 July 1865, at midday.

After his return from the Gulf, McIntyre's intention was to return north in the cooler months of 1865 and claim Dalgonally – but he would have to stock it with Queensland cattle because stock were prohibited from crossing the border with New South Wales. In late May 1865 he was in Queensland on his way to collect a mob of cattle on the Barcoo River, and from there to drive them to Dalgonally. But circumstances changed. In a letter to Donald Campbell dated 24 August 1865, McIntyre describes his movements:

I have been up in Queensland and bought a lot of cattle from a station near the Barcoo River. I started on May 27, passing through the Maranoa district. After a journey of nearly 500 miles I arrived at the station to take delivery. Everything was in great confusion. We had to put up cattle yards before we could do anything – and no water where the station and yards were. After a month’s hard work we got the cattle together and started them. I intended to go a week with them to see how McLeod would shape. In a few days I saw he was not capable of taking the cattle on alone, and as I would not be able to continue with him (I had to return to the Darling River for the horses) we drove the cattle back to the station and let them go again – for the place had been deserted by the owners...

On 12 July, McIntyre and McLeod left the station for the Darling River, arriving in mid-August. The letter continues:

... I learned ... for the first time that I had been appointed leader of the Ladies’ Leichhardt Search Expedition ... The camels and stores left here yesterday [23 August] for Mount Murchison – 90 miles without water. I am going up the river to get horses and to sell the rubbish they sent up. Had they been the best horses in Victoria they would not be fit to go northward after getting here in such a season as this.

In late August 1865, with fresh horses and in drought conditions, the expedition led by McIntyre started from the Darling. It was to proceed to that part of the Flinders where McIntyre had seen traces of Leichhardt. Fresh stores could be obtained as needed from Burketown, the settlement recently established on the Albert River.

== Disaster near Curracunya ==
On 5 October the party was camped at Curracunya Springs (near present day Dynevor), 240 miles from the Darling River and 200 miles from Cooper Creek. Five weeks later, after the party was forced to leave Curracunya, a disaster occurred. The true circumstances surrounding this disaster are not known. The available evidence suggests that the party could not find water at Cooper Creek and retreated. The party split in two: McIntyre and one other man moving ahead on camels and planning to return with water; the second group, led by Dr James Murray, coming along behind with the horses and stores. When the two groups met again, the expedition in its original composition was at an end: 66 horses dead in the desert, and stores and equipment scattered. In his diary for November 1865, Alexander Gray had this to say:

26th. Went to Cooper Creek, 45 miles no water.

27th. Came back. Got to a dry hole at night.

28th. Started to crawl and we made to save our own lives. Donald McIntyre, Barnett, McCalman, Dr Murray, a Black Boy and I travelled until our horses gave out. Dr Murray went on and left us. We let the horses go and we tried to walk but we were not able, so we laid down for dead. When the cool of the night came on we got a little stronger and we crawled along the tracks until we met Belooch with a little water which gave us great ease. We walked into camp about 10. Sixty hours without a drop of water, 86 hours without anything to eat, 97 hours on half a Johnny cake...

== Cooper Creek Camp ==
Several members of the party returned to the settled districts while McIntyre and the remainder of the party once again moved ahead to Cooper Creek. The whole of December was spent finding permanent water in Cooper Creek and collecting the scattered stores. By 14 January 1866 a stockade had been erected as protection against the aborigines.

On 9 February the expedition left Cooper Creek with 12 camels, 5 horses, nearly two tons of stores and six men: Duncan McIntyre, John McCalman, William Barnett, Belooch, Welbo and Myola (three aborigines). They arrived at the Cloncurry River on Sunday 18 March. The tree marked with Leichhardt's initials on the Flinders River was about 60 kilometres distant in a south-easterly direction. For several days McIntyre and Welbo searched the Flinders River for other traces of Leichhardt but were unsuccessful.

== Death at Grave Hole ==
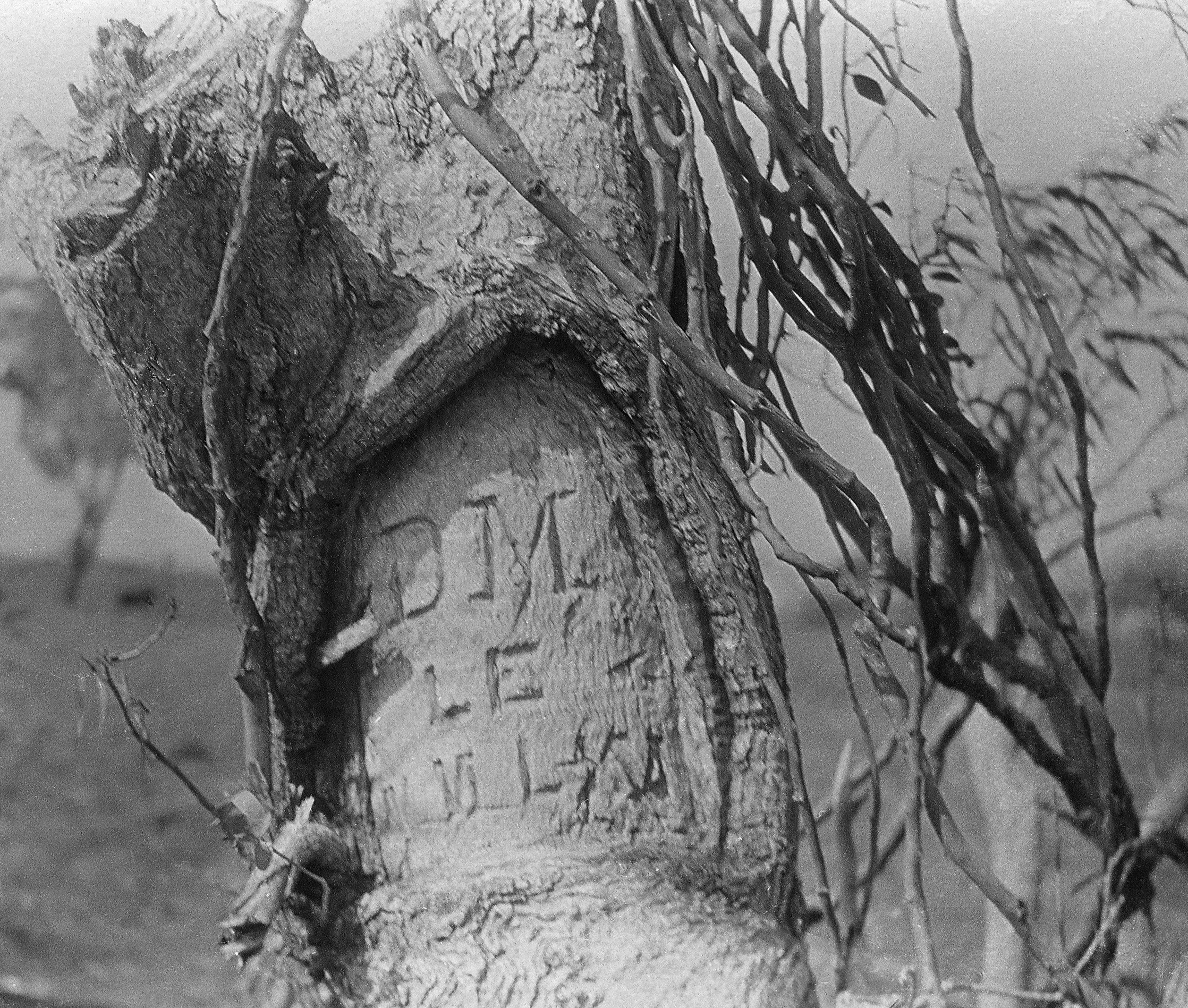
Inscription on tree near McIntyre's grave, ca 1930

To make good the loss of equipment that occurred at Cooper Creek, McIntyre went to Burketown towards the end of April 1866. A fever of plague proportions was sweeping the town, thought to have been brought in by a ship, the Margaret and Mary. It was the wet season, the climate oppressive, there was a want of proper provisions and medicines, and resistance to the disease was low.

On 21 May, McIntyre showed the first symptoms of the fever. Two days later, still unwell, he rode back to the base camp on the Gilliat River and died there on 4 June. He was buried on the morning of 6 June beside a waterhole now known as Grave Hole. The letters DM LE (Duncan McIntyre, Leichhardt Expedition) were carved into a tree near the grave. A section of this tree is now in the Duncan McIntyre Museum in Julia Creek.

After McIntyre's death, W.S. Sloman took over as leader. Dalgonally Station (then occupied by Duncan's brother, Donald McIntyre) became the base for the expedition and several rivers were investigated in the search for Leichhardt. In the latter part of 1866 Sloman died. William Barnett (the same man who accompanied McIntyre on his first trip to the Gulf ) became the new leader. Starting in January 1867 and finishing in May, the expedition made a sweep of the country between latitudes 20° and 21° south, and longitudes 142° to 140° east. No evidence of Leichhardt was found and the search was terminated.

== Celtic Cross ==
McIntyre's Grave in 1951

In 1918 a Celtic Cross was erected over McIntyre's grave. Ulick Browne Snr remembered the occasion:

I am pleased to have witnessed in 1918 the arrival at Julia Creek of the monument now erected at the Grave Hole, put there by the family, the proceedings directed by Mrs Annie McKay. Melrose and Fenwick of Townsville supplied and engraved the stone, but by 1957 the inscription was well-nigh illegible. Bill Horton, teamster, carted the monument on his tabletop waggon with a 19-horse team (no lorries then); and Bill Norton, butcher and handyman of Julia Creek, erected it.

The inscription reads:

In memory of Duncan MacIntyre [sic] who, while leading an expedition in search of Leichhardt organised by the Ladies of Melbourne, died here on 4th June 1866 aged 34 years. He was a man of promise, of courage and integrity, and whilst beset with difficulties, pushed on faithfully until struck down by fever and death, being attended at the last by his brother, Donald MacIntyre of Dalgonally, to whom also this stone stands in memory. He took up this country with his brother in 1863, lived here until 1906, and died in Sydney, March 1907 aged 80 years. He left a wife and family by whom this stone is erected in loving memory.
Gus am bris an la agus an teich na sgailean.

== Sources ==
- Barnett, William: Letter to his Aunt, November 1864, West Sussex Record Office, Corfield Papers, Accession No: 5553.
- Burns, Guy: Tanksinker, pp 76–91.
- Browne, S. Ulick: Exploration of Julia Creek District (Including searches for lost explorers), Journal of the Royal Historical Society of Qld, Vol VI, No. 1, p247, September 1959.
- Gill, J. C. H. (October 1987), "The diary of William Frederic Barnett in search of Leichhardt", Memoirs of the Queensland Museum, 25 (1): 1–44, ISSN 0079-8835
- Gill, J. C. H. (1983). "Duncan McIntyre and the search for Leichhardt". Journal of the Royal Historical Society of QLD. 11 (4): 51–73. ISSN 0815-9653.
- Gray, Alexander: Diary of Alexander Gray, State Library of Victoria, MS11498.
