= Hilton Mine =

Zinc, lead and silver mine in Queensland, Australia

The Hilton Mine is a zinc, lead and silver mine in northwestern Queensland, Australia, approximately 22 kilometres (14 mi) north of the Mount Isa Mines. The mineralization is in the same grey dolomitic Urquhart Shale as the Mount Isa Mines deposit and a similar diagenesis is posited. It is one of five "supergiant" zinc, lead and silver mineralized deposits that have been found in the Mount Isa Inlier, six if one counts the high silver deposit at Cannington.

In 1947, geologists working for Mount Isa Mines discovered the deposit and named it Hilton after Charlie Hilton, who, at the time, was the Mount Isa Mines manager. Metal prices were too low for the original start up planned for 1969, so the Hilton Mine began production in 1989, and by 1998 production was slowed in favour of the George Fisher Mine located two km further north, as well as because the most accessible ore had been mined. As of 2002, additional mining at the Hilton Mine is in abeyance pending conditions at the George Fisher Mine.

== See also ==
- List of mines in Australia
