= Gilliat River =

Gilliat
- Location of Gilliat river mouth in Queensland

Location
- Country: Australia
- Territory: Queensland
- Region: Gulf Country

Physical characteristics
- Source: Mount Edna
  - location: Swords Range, Gulf Country, Australia
  - elevation: 198 m (650 ft)
- Mouth: Cloncurry River
  - location: Australia
  - coordinates: 20°03′47″S 141°12′14″E
  - elevation: 82 m (269 ft)

The Gilliat River is a river in the Gulf Country region of Queensland, Australia.

The headwaters of the river are under Mount Edna in the Swords Range, it then flows in a northerly direction and crosses the Landsborough Highway near Hutt Mill and then continues north west. It then forms a series of braided channels as it continues through the mostly uninhabited Gulf Country savannah. The river crosses the Flinders Highway approximately 20 kilometres (12 mi) west of Julia Creek. Many channels then flow through the Cockatoo Waterhole and then the river discharges into the Cloncurry River of which it is a tributary.

== See also ==
- List of rivers of Australia § Queensland
