= Cannington Mine =

Mine in Queensland, Australia

Cannington mine
- Interactive map of Cannington mine
- Location: Queensland, Australia
- Products: Silver; Lead; Zinc
- Type: Underground
- Opened: 1997
- Company: South32

The Cannington Silver and Lead Mine is an Australian underground mine located in north-west Queensland, in the Shire of McKinlay, about 200 kilometres (124 mi) southeast of Mount Isa. The deposit was discovered by BHP in 1990. The mine was the supplier of silver for the Sydney 2000 Summer Olympics and the Beijing 2008 Summer Olympics. Cannington takes its name from the pastoral property near the deposit.

== Geography ==
Cannington lies on a broad plain with a few low mesas. The plain is crossed by meandering rivers which are dry for a large part of the year, but which flood periodically. The area is semi-arid with 250 millimetres (9.84 in) of annual rainfall falling mostly between November and March. The mine itself lies near the confluence of the Hamilton River and Trepell Creek.

=== Climate ===
Due to its very high evapotranspiration, Cannington Mine has a subtropical desert climate (Köppen: BWh) with very hot, erratically wetter summers and very mild, dry winters. The wettest recorded day was 27 March 2019 with 178.2 mm (7.02 in) of rainfall. Extreme temperatures ranged from 46.8 °C (116.2 °F) on 14 January 2013 to 0.0 °C (32.0 °F) on 20 July 2004.

Climate data was taken from the nearest weather station at Trepell Airport.

Climate data for Trepell Airport (21.84°S 140.89°E) (266 m (873 ft) AMSL) (2001-2025)
Month	Jan	Feb	Mar	Apr	May	Jun	Jul	Aug	Sep	Oct	Nov	Dec	Year
Record high °C (°F)	46.8 (116.2)	45.0 (113.0)	43.0 (109.4)	40.0 (104.0)	37.3 (99.1)	33.6 (92.5)	34.6 (94.3)	37.8 (100.0)	41.0 (105.8)	44.0 (111.2)	44.9 (112.8)	46.8 (116.2)	46.8 (116.2)
Mean daily maximum °C (°F)	37.9 (100.2)	36.9 (98.4)	35.7 (96.3)	32.9 (91.2)	28.1 (82.6)	24.6 (76.3)	24.7 (76.5)	27.4 (81.3)	31.9 (89.4)	35.8 (96.4)	37.5 (99.5)	38.8 (101.8)	32.7 (90.8)
Mean daily minimum °C (°F)	24.7 (76.5)	23.5 (74.3)	22.0 (71.6)	17.7 (63.9)	12.8 (55.0)	9.1 (48.4)	8.2 (46.8)	9.7 (49.5)	14.5 (58.1)	18.8 (65.8)	21.7 (71.1)	23.9 (75.0)	17.2 (63.0)
Record low °C (°F)	17.0 (62.6)	14.3 (57.7)	12.6 (54.7)	7.7 (45.9)	2.2 (36.0)	1.4 (34.5)	0.0 (32.0)	1.0 (33.8)	5.0 (41.0)	7.7 (45.9)	11.2 (52.2)	15.1 (59.2)	0.0 (32.0)
Average precipitation mm (inches)	110.7 (4.36)	77.3 (3.04)	61.7 (2.43)	10.7 (0.42)	5.9 (0.23)	11.3 (0.44)	7.0 (0.28)	3.0 (0.12)	6.9 (0.27)	14.0 (0.55)	33.5 (1.32)	47.2 (1.86)	381.6 (15.02)
Average precipitation days (≥ 0.2 mm)	8.1	7.1	4.8	1.9	1.8	1.8	1.3	0.8	1.8	2.5	5.7	5.8	43.4
Source: Bureau of Meteorology (2001-2025)

== Geology ==
The deposit is in Paleoproterozoic to Mesoproterozoic (2500–1000 mya) metamorphosed sedimentary rocks, known as the "Soldier's Cap Group", and is overlain by approximately 60 metres (197 ft) of Cretaceous and more recent overburden. The deposit was discovered as result of an aeromagnetic survey of the Soldiers Cap Group in the eastern Mount Isa inlier. The area was selected for survey based upon extrapolations from known prospects and associated lithostratigraphy. In other words, the rocks were the same as other known prospects, only slightly more deeply buried. The aeromagnetic survey pinpointed Cannington as a potential site and subsequent drilling proved it out.

The theory of formation of the Cannington deposit, and the related deposits at McArthur River, Century, Mount Isa, Hilton, and George Fisher, is explored in a 2005 paper by Large, et al.

The major ore minerals are galena and sphalerite. The silver occurs mainly as freibergite but is also present in solid solution within the galena.

== Management ==
On 19 August 2014, BHP announced it was splitting the company in two with Cannington Mine amongst the assets transferred to South32.

== Mining ==
The deposit was discovered by BHP in 1990. Although sitework and underground mining began in 1997, full production was not achieved until early 1999, with 1.5 million tons of ore processed in 1999. Production reached 3 million tons of ore per year and in 2010 it was the largest and lowest cost silver and lead mine in the world. Original expected life of the Cannington mine was 25 years, however South32 is targeting an extension of the mine life at least until 2032 at reduced production of around 1.8 million tons, with further activity possible given current metal prices.

== Facilities ==
The mine site is serviced by road from McKinlay and the private Trepell Airport. A small housing settlement exists on site for mine workers, consisting of 270 short term accommodation rooms, 364 village rooms, and serving about 67 000 meals per month. Employment is given as about 600 people and a further 300 to 400 contractors, of which 70% of the mine workers are estimated to be fly-in fly-out (FIFO) from Townsville. The mine site has a 3 megawatt solar farm to reduce gas consumption and associated greenhouse gas emissions. Electricity generated by the solar farm is used to supply the operation’s accommodation village and airport with surplus power used to support mining and processing operations. It is anticipated that the solar farm will prevent between 4,000 and 6,000 tonnes of greenhouse gas emissions per year. Two deaths have occurred at the site, a 19-year-old trainee driller on 15 December 2006, and a fifty-one-year-old contractor on 17 January 2008.
