= Kynuna =

- Town
- Interactive map of Kynuna
- Coordinates: 21.5777°S 141.9197°E
- Country: Australia
- State: Queensland
- LGAs: Shire of McKinlay; Shire of Winton
- Location: 117 km (73 mi) S of Julia Creek; 164 km (102 mi) NW of Winton; 304 km (189 mi) ESE of Mount Isa; 1,522 km (946 mi) NW of Brisbane

Government
  - State electorates: Traeger; Gregory
  - Federal divisions: Kennedy; Maranoa

Area
  - Total: 8,454.6 km^{2} (3,264.3 sq mi)

Population
  - Total: 52 (2021 census)
  - Density: 0.00615/km^{2} (0.01593/sq mi)
- Time zone: UTC+10:00 (AEST)
- Postcode: 4823
Localities around Kynuna
Julia Creek	Julia Creek	Maxwelton
Mckinlay	Kynuna	Albion
Mckinlay	Middleton	Corfield

Kynuna is an outback town in the Shire of McKinlay and a locality split between the Shire of McKinlay and the Shire of Winton in Queensland, Australia. In the 2021 census, the locality of Kynuna had a population of 52 people.

== Geography ==
Kynuna is on the banks of the Diamantina River. The town is located on the Landsborough Highway, 1,521 kilometres (945 mi) north west of the state capital, Brisbane and 303 kilometres (188 mi) south east of the regional centre of Mount Isa. The Richmond–Winton Road follows a section of the south-eastern boundary.

Kynuna lies at the northern rim of a roughly circular zone measuring some 130 kilometres (81 mi) across that has been identified by Geoscience Australia as a crustal anomaly. Proof is currently lacking as to the cause, but it is believed likely that the anomaly was caused by an asteroid strike that happened about 300 million years ago.

== History ==
The Wanamara lands ran from the north as far as Kynuna. Wanamarra (also known as Maykulan and Wunumura) is an Australian Aboriginal language in North West Queensland. The language region includes areas within the Shire of McKinlay, Shire of Cloncurry and Shire of Richmond, including the Flinders River area, and the towns of Kynuna and Richmond.

The town was established as a shearer's union camp at a supply point for the nearby Kynuna pastoral station, at a place where five roads met the Diamantina River. The town was gazetted in 1894 and at one stage soon after had a population of around 700 people and was home to three pubs.

Local legend claims that the suicide of a local shearer named Samuel Hoffmeister at Combo Waterhole near Kynuna in 1894 was the inspiration for the Banjo Paterson song "Waltzing Matilda". Paterson was at one time engaged to Sarah Riley, the daughter of a local squatter, and visited the area.

Kynuna Post Office opened on 1 May 1883 (a receiving office had been open from 1882) and closed in 1990.

Kynuna Provisional School opened on 12 June 1899. On 1 January 1909 it became Kynuna State School. It closed in 1992.

== Demographics ==
In the 2006 census, the locality of Kynuna had a population of 95 people.

In the 2016 census, the locality of Kynuna had a population of 55 people.

In the 2021 census, the locality of Kynuna had a population of 52 people.

== Education ==
There are no schools in Kynuna. The nearest government primary school is Julia Creek State School in neighbouring Julia Creek to the north. There are no secondary schools nearby. Distance education and boarding schools are the alternatives.

== Amenities ==
Today, the town has one pub, the Blue Heeler Hotel. The pub was built as the Kynuna Hotel in 1889.
