= Flinders Highway, Queensland =

Highway in Queensland, Australia

Flinders Highway Queensland
- Flinders Highway (green on black)

General information
- Type: Highway
- Length: 775 km (482 mi)
- Route number(s): State Highway A6
- Former route number: National Route 78

Major junctions
- West end: Barkly Highway (National Highway A2), Cloncurry
- Landsborough Highway (National Highway A2), east of Cloncurry; Kennedy Developmental Road (State Route 62); Gregory Developmental Road (State Highway A7); Gregory Developmental Road (State Route 63)
- East end: Bruce Highway (Queensland Highway A1), Townsville

Location(s)
- Major settlements: Julia Creek, Richmond, Hughenden, Charters Towers

Highway system
- Highways in Australia; National Highway • Freeways in Australia; Highways in Queensland

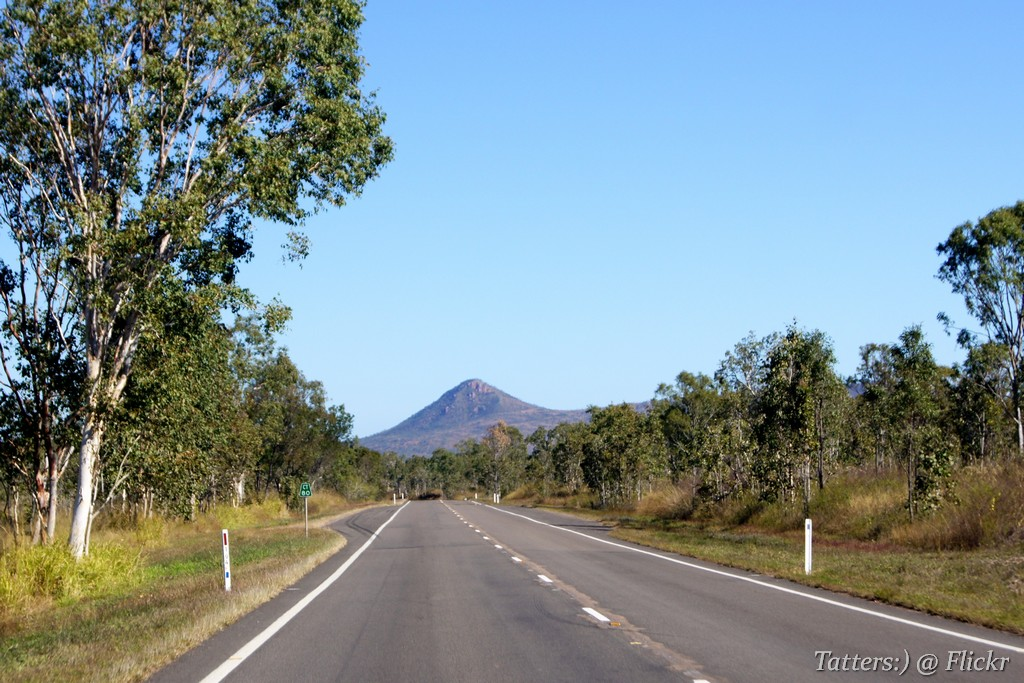
Southbound on the Flinders Highway between Reid River and Mingela

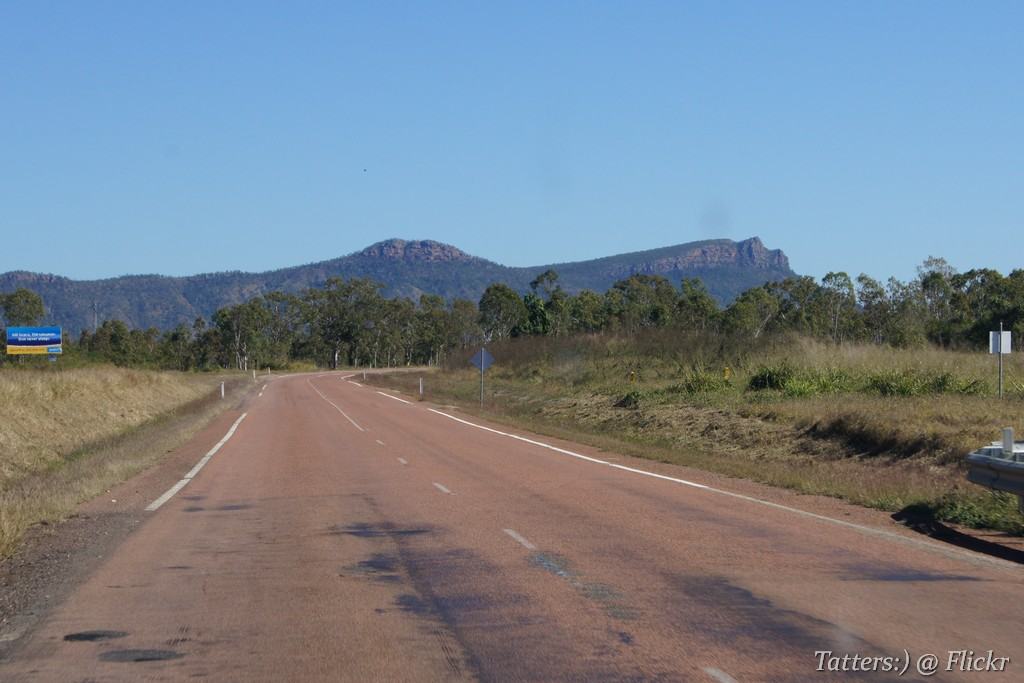
Southbound on the Flinders Highway between Calcium and Reid River

The Flinders Highway is a highway that crosses Queensland east to west, from Townsville on the Pacific coast to Cloncurry. The road continues as the Barkly Highway from Cloncurry to the Northern Territory border at Camooweal and beyond. The Flinders Highway passes a number of small outback towns and typical outback landscape predominates towards the inland. It was known as National Route 78 before Queensland began to convert to the alphanumeric system being adopted in Australia and is now designated as A6. The highway is also known as Overlanders Way. Its entire length is part of the National Land Transport Network (formerly Auslink).

== State-controlled road ==
Flinders Highway is a state-controlled national road. It is defined in five sections, as follows:

- Number 14A, Townsville to Charters Towers.
- Number 14B, Charters Towers to Hughenden.
- Number 14C, Hughenden to Richmond.
- Number 14D, Richmond to Julia Creek.
- Number 14E, Julia Creek to Cloncurry.

== History ==
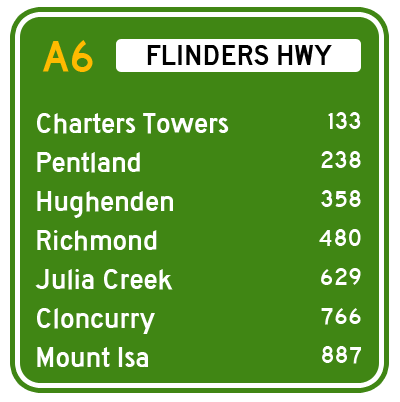
Approximate road distances (in kilometres) of towns from Townsville along the highway

As of 1957, only the Townsville to Charters Towers section was sealed. The rest of the highway was progressively sealed with the last section completed in November 1976.

In the 1980s, the second stage of the Ross River Dam necessitated a deviation of the Flinders Highway and Mount Isa railway line (which previously ran straight north–south) to be further east. This was completed by 1986 and resulted in the closure of Toonpan and Barringha railway stations on the removed route; they were not re-established on new route.

== Northern Australia Roads Program upgrades ==
The Northern Australia Roads Program announced in 2016 included two projects for the Flinders Highway.

=== Pavement strengthening ===
The project for pavement strengthening and rehabilitation between Townsville and Torrens Creek was expected to finish in late 2021 at a total cost of $22.2 million.

=== Replacement of culverts ===
The project for replacement of culverts between Charters Towers and Richmond was completed in late 2018 at a total cost of $15.1 million.

== Roads of Strategic Importance upgrades ==
The Roads of Strategic Importance initiative, last updated in March 2022, includes the following projects for the Flinders Highway.

=== Corridor upgrade ===
A lead project to upgrade the Queensland section of the Tennant Creek to Townsville corridor, including sections of the Barkly and Flinders Highways, the Kennedy Developmental Road and surrounding state and council roads, at an estimated cost of $250 million, was in the planning stage in 2020.

=== Overtaking lanes ===
A project to construct overtaking lanes between Townsville and Charters Towers at a cost of $33.4 million is planned to be completed by mid-2023. This project is targeted for "early works" by the Queensland Government, and has been split into two packages.

=== Pavement strengthening and widening ===
A project to strengthen and widen the pavement at Scrubby Creek, between Julia Creek and Cloncurry, at a cost of $32.6 million is due for completion in early 2024. This project is targeted for "early works" by the Queensland Government.

=== Wide centre line treatment ===
A project to deliver wide centre lines on a section of road between Townsville and Charters Towers at a cost of $9.7 million was due for completion in early 2022. This project was targeted for "early works" by the Queensland Government, and was split into two packages.

== Other upgrades ==
=== Construct acceleration lane ===
A project to construct an acceleration lane at Woodstock, at a cost of $5 million, was completed in December 2020.

== Towns ==
=== Charters Towers ===
Charters Towers, 133 km to the south west from Townsville. A former gold rush town with a population of 30 000 in 1890. At that time it was known as "The World" because it seemed to be the centre of everything. Presently it is a centre for cattle grazing, with gold mining continuing to be an important industry. Much of the elegant gold rush architecture of the nineteenth century remains in place and is a tourist attraction.

=== Pentland ===
Pentland is located between Charters Towers and Hughenden. Pentland is about 140 kilometres (87 mi) away from the town of Hughenden and 240 kilometres (150 mi) from the North Queensland city of Townsville. Hughenden has about 2000 people and Charters Towers has about 9000. Pentland's population is estimated to be 250 people.

=== Hughenden ===
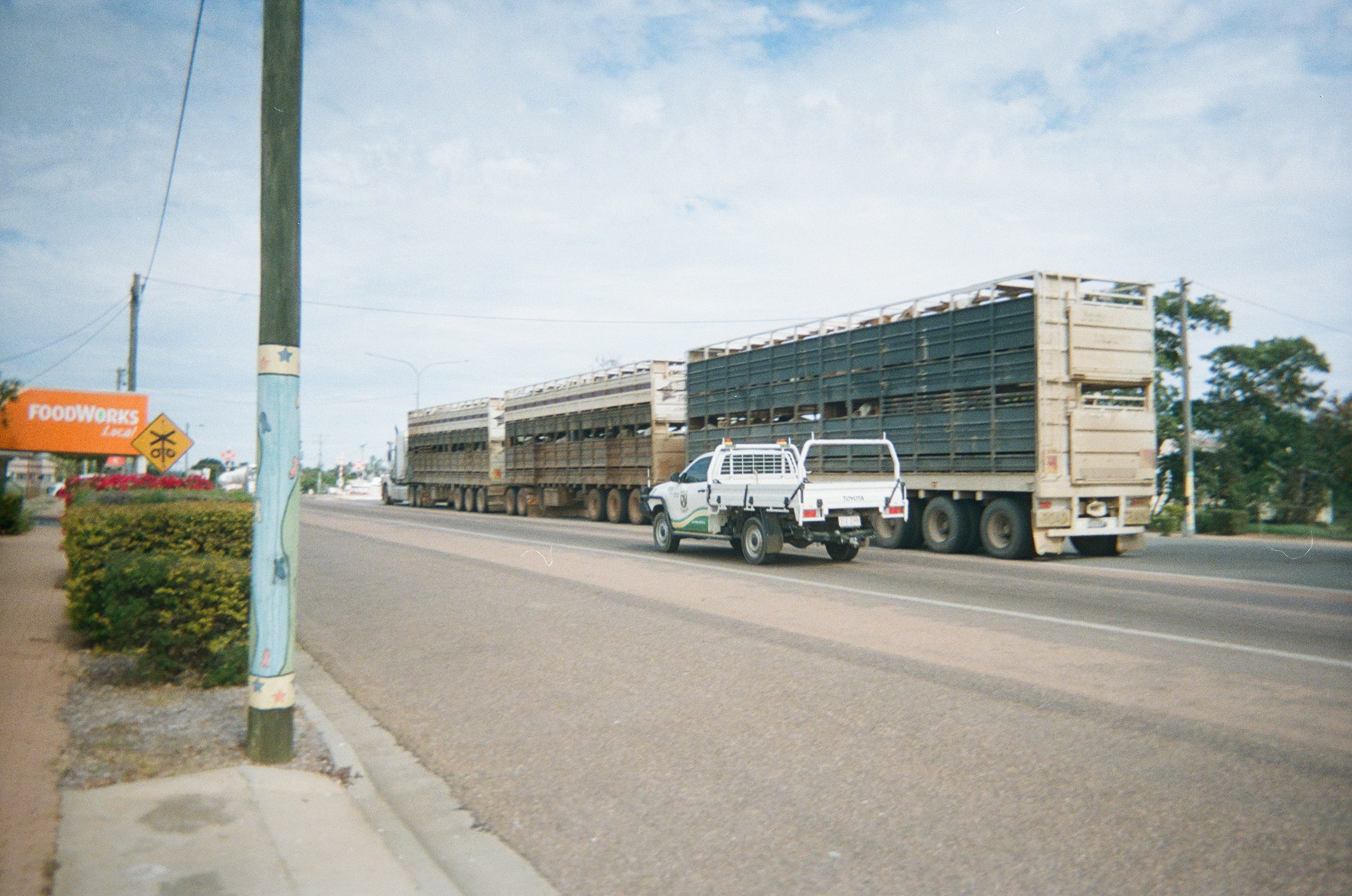
A road train full of cattle temporarily parked in Hughenden before continuing east towards Townsville

Located 243 km further on, Hughenden, the administrative centre of Flinders shire is in the heart of sheep and cattle country.

=== Richmond ===
Richmond, a former gold rush town located 112 km further west. Currently a pastoral centre.

=== Julia Creek ===
Julia Creek, 147 km further west, another pastoral settlement

=== Cloncurry ===
Cloncurry, former copper-mining town located 139 km west from Julia Creek. The first regular Qantas flights started between here and Charleville in 1922 and Royal Flying Doctor Service of Australia service started here in 1928. Nowadays it is an important road and rail junction. Flinders Highway ends here.

== Major intersections ==
LGA	Location	km	mi	Destinations	Notes
Townsville	Stuart	0	0.0	Bruce Highway (Queensland Highway A1) – north–west – Townsville / south–east – Ayr / Southern Port Road – north–east – Port of Townsville	Eastern end of Flinders Highway (National Route A6)
Townsville	Stuart	1.9	1.2	Stuart Drive – north – Townsville	Flinders Highway continues south on Stuart Drive
Burdekin River		105	65	Macrossan Bridge (see also Great Northern Railway)	
Charters Towers	Charters Towers	122	76	Gregory Highway (State Route 63) – west – Greenvale	Northern concurrency terminus with Gregory Highway / Flinders Highway continues southwest through Charters Towers
Charters Towers	Black Jack	130	81	Gregory Highway (State Route A7) – south – Clermont	Southern concurrency terminus with Gregory Highway
Flinders	Torrens Creek	284	176	Torrens Creek Aramac Road (State Route 18) – south – Aramac	
Flinders	Hughenden	371	231	Hughenden Muttaburra Road (State Route 19) – south – Muttaburra	
Flinders	Hughenden	373.0	231.8	Kennedy Developmental Road (State Route 62) – west – Winton	Southern concurrency terminus with Kennedy Developmental Road
Flinders	Hughenden	373.1	231.8	Kennedy Developmental Road (State Route 62) – north – Mount Garnet	Northern concurrency terminus with Kennedy Developmental Road
McKinlay	Julia Creek	637	396	Julia Creek Kynuna Road (State Route 84) – south – Kynuna	
McKinlay	Julia Creek	640	400	Wills Developmental Road (State Route 84) – north–west – Burketown	
Cloncurry	Cloncurry	759	472	Landsborough Highway (National Route A2) – south–east – Kynuna	Eastern concurrency terminus with Landsborough Highway
Cloncurry River		775.0	481.6	Ernest Henry Bridge	
Cloncurry	Cloncurry	775.2	481.7	Burke Developmental Road (National Route 83) – north – Normanton / Barkly Highway (National Route A2) – west – Mount Isa	Western concurrency terminus with Landsborough Highway. Western end of Flinders Highway
1.000 mi = 1.609 km; 1.000 km = 0.621 mi: Concurrency terminus

== Intersecting state-controlled roads ==
In addition to the Bruce, Landsborough and Barkly Highways, and the Gregory, Kennedy, Wills and Burke Developmental Roads, the following state-controlled roads, from east to west, intersect with the Flinders Highway:

- Townsville Port Road
- Townsville Connection Road
- Woodstock–Giru Road
- Burdekin Falls Dam Road
- Aramac–Torrens Creek Road
- Hughenden–Muttaburra Road
- Richmond–Winton Road
- Julia Creek–Kynuna Road

=== Julia Creek–Kynuna Road ===
Julia Creek–Kynuna Road
- Location: Flinders Highway, Julia Creek to Landsborough Highway, Kynuna
- Length: 112 km (70 mi)

Julia Creek–Kynuna Road is a state-controlled district road (number 5807), rated as a local road of regional significance (LRRS). It runs from the Flinders Highway in Julia Creek to the Landsborough Highway in Kynuna, a distance of 112 kilometres (70 mi). It does not intersect with any other state-controlled roads.

== Crime ==
It has been speculated that a serial killer operates in the vicinity. This is a result of the disappearance of Tony Jones and Arthur Stanley Brown.

== See also ==
- Highways in Australia
- List of highways in Queensland
