= McKinlay, Queensland =

McKinlay
- Town
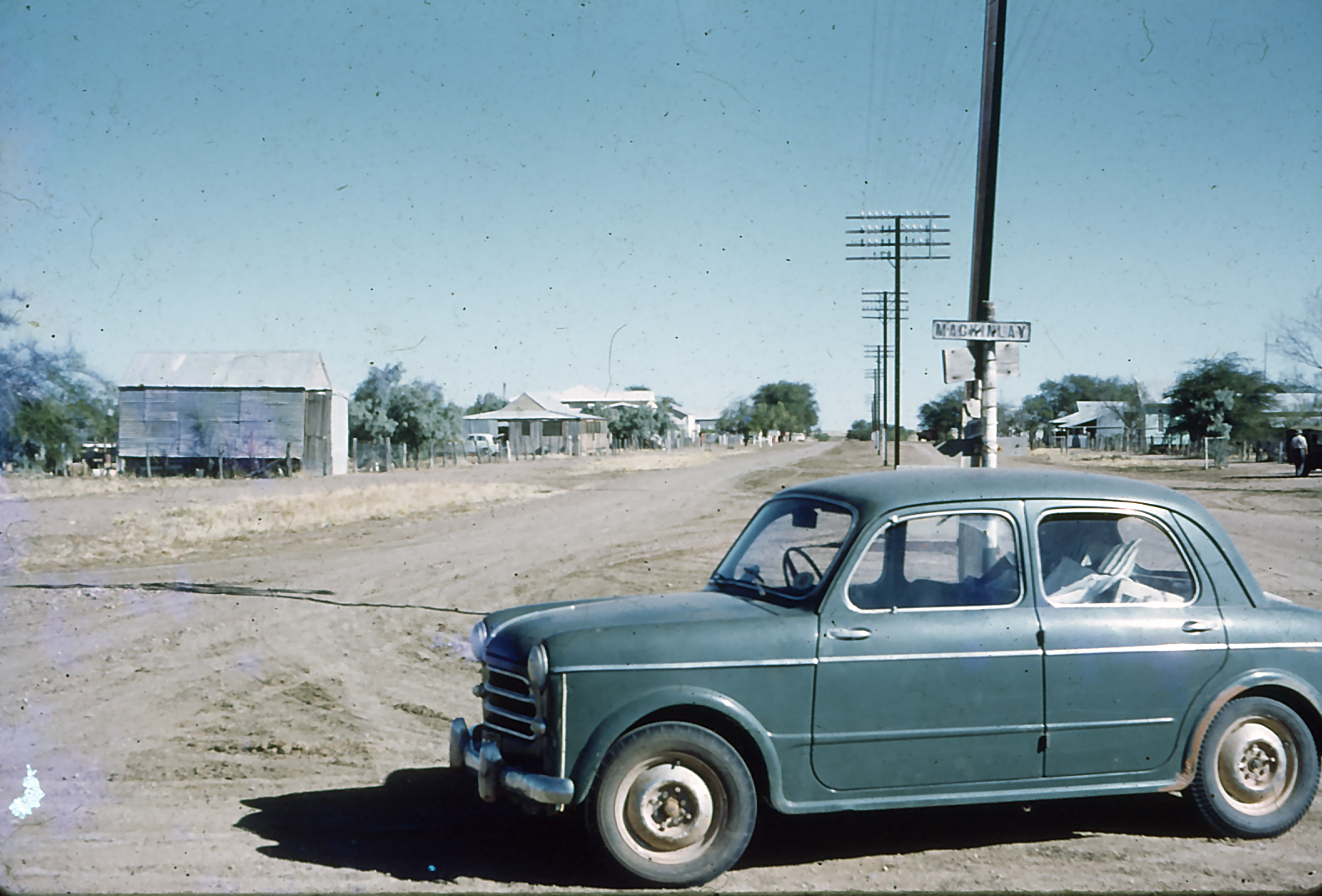
- The Landsborough Highway through McKinlay in 1962

- Interactive map of McKinlay
- Coordinates: 21.2713°S 141.2902°E
- Country: Australia
- State: Queensland
- LGA: McKinlay Shire
- Location: 101 km (63 mi) SW of Julia Creek; 108 km (67 mi) SE of Cloncurry; 228 km (142 mi) ESE of Mount Isa; 748 km (465 mi) WSW of Townsville; 1,598 km (993 mi) NW of Brisbane
- Established: 1888

Government
  - State electorate: Traeger
  - Federal division: Kennedy

Area
  - Total: 8,837.5 km^{2} (3,412.2 sq mi)
- Elevation: 170 m (560 ft)

Population
  - Total: 162 (2021 census)
  - Density: 0.01833/km^{2} (0.04748/sq mi)
- Time zone: UTC+10:00 (AEST)
- Postcode: 4823
Localities around McKinlay
Cloncurry	Julia Creek	Julia Creek
Kuridala	McKinlay	Kynuna
Selwyn	Middleton	Middleton

McKinlay is an outback town and locality in McKinlay Shire, Queensland, Australia. In the 2021 census, the locality of McKinlay had a population of 162 people.

== Geography ==
McKinlay is in the Gulf Country in the remote north-west of Queensland, 1,595 kilometres (991 mi) north west of the state capital Brisbane and 228 kilometres (142 mi) south east of the regional centre of Mount Isa.

The town is located slightly north of the centre of the locality. The Landsborough Highway enters the locality from the east (Kynuna), passes through the town along Kirby Street, and exits to the north-west (Kuridala / Cloncurry).

The McKinlay River enters the locality from the south-west (Selwyn), flows immediately north-west of the town, exiting the locality to the north (Julia Creek) where it becomes a tributary of the Gilliart River, ultimately becoming a tributary of the Flinders River which flows into the Gulf of Carpentaria.

== History ==
McKinlay is named for the nearby McKinlay River—itself named for the Scottish explorer John McKinlay who was the first European to discover the river in 1861.

Gold was discovered in the area in 1872.

A letter receiving office was opened in 1883. Mackinlay Post Office opened on 1 April 1894 and was renamed McKinlay in 1909.

The town was surveyed and allotments sold in 1888.

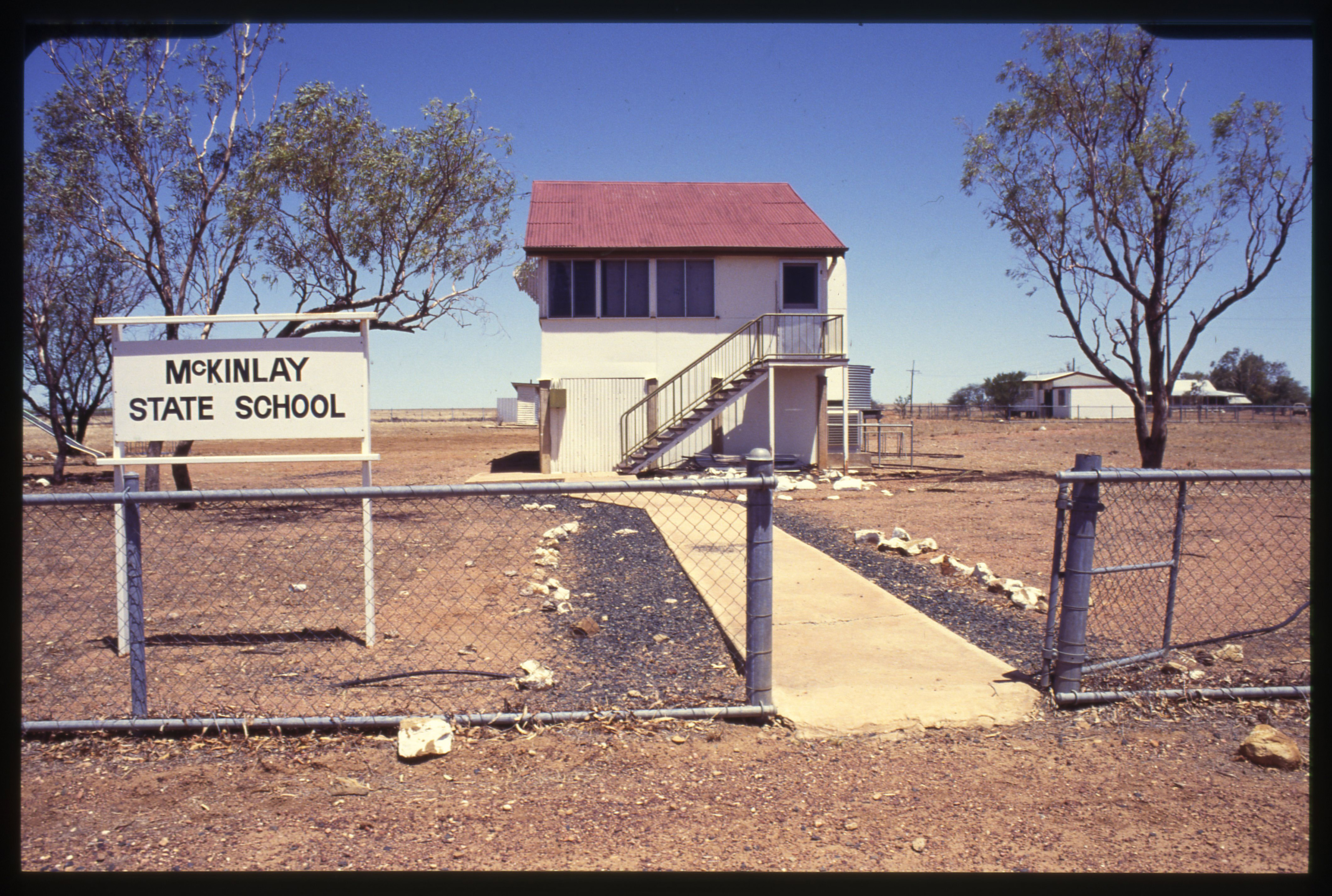
McKinlay State School, circa 1994

Mackinlay State School opened on 5 July 1897. In 1934, the spelling of the name was changed to McKinlay State School. It closed in 1953 but reopened in January 1957. It closed permanently on 5 December 1986. It was on a 10-acre (4.0 ha) site bounded by Poole Street, Wylde Street, and Kirby Street. The school building remains on the site as a community facility; it faces Wylde Street (21.2736°S 141.2902°E).

The offices of the Shire of McKinlay were located in the town until 1930 when they were relocated to Julia Creek.

St Mary the Virgin's Anglican Church was officially opened and dedicated by Bishop John Feetham on Sunday 8 August 1937. The church building had been relocated from Kynuna where it had been previously used as a Roman Catholic church. It has now closed in McKinlay.

Our Lady of the Way Catholic Church was in Middleton Street. It opened in 1961, after being relocated from Julia Creek, where it had been St Abigail's Catholic Church. It has now closed in McKinlay.

== Demographics ==
In the 2011 census, the locality of McKinlay had a population of 417 people.

In the 2016 census, the locality of McKinlay had a population of 178 people.

In the 2021 census, the locality of McKinlay had a population of 162 people.

== Economy ==
South 32 Cannington mine, Australia's largest silver and lead mine, is 85 kilometres (53 mi) west of McKinlay.

== Education ==
There are no schools in McKinlay. Students living in the north-west of the locality can attend Cloncurry State School (Prep-12) in neighbouring Cloncurry to the north-west. Students living in the north-east of the locality can attend Julia Creek State School (Prep-6) in neighbouring Julia Creek to the north-east. The alternatives are distance education and boarding school.

== Amenities ==
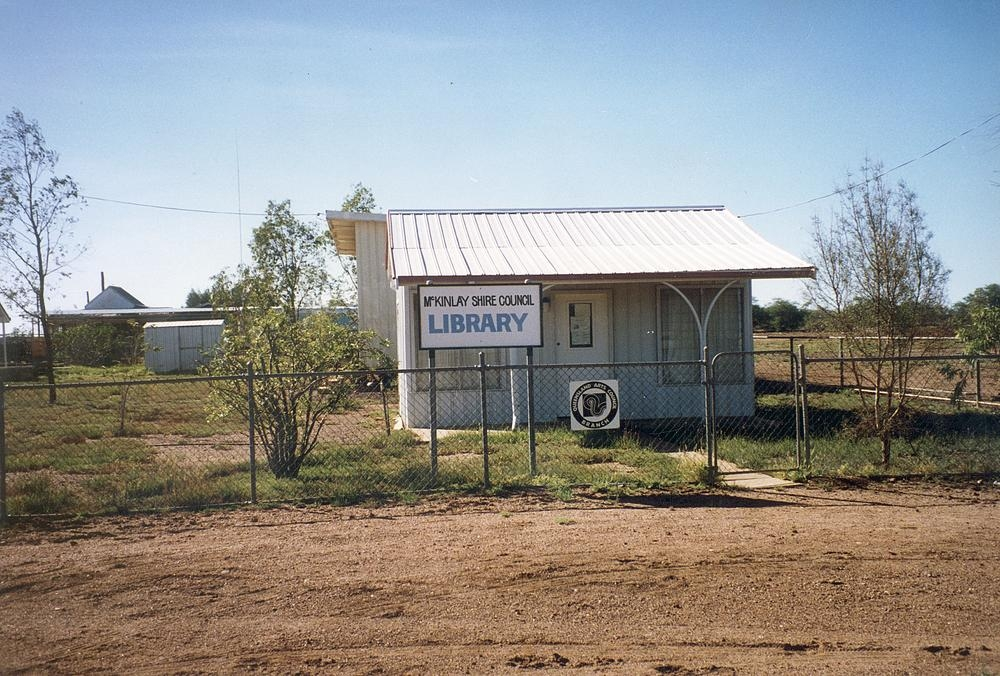
Public library, smallest in Queensland, McKinlay, 2004

McKinlay has a park and a small museum.

The Crafty Old School House (the former McKinlay State School) in Wylde Street is used for community events and can hired for private events. The school's tennis courts are also available for use.

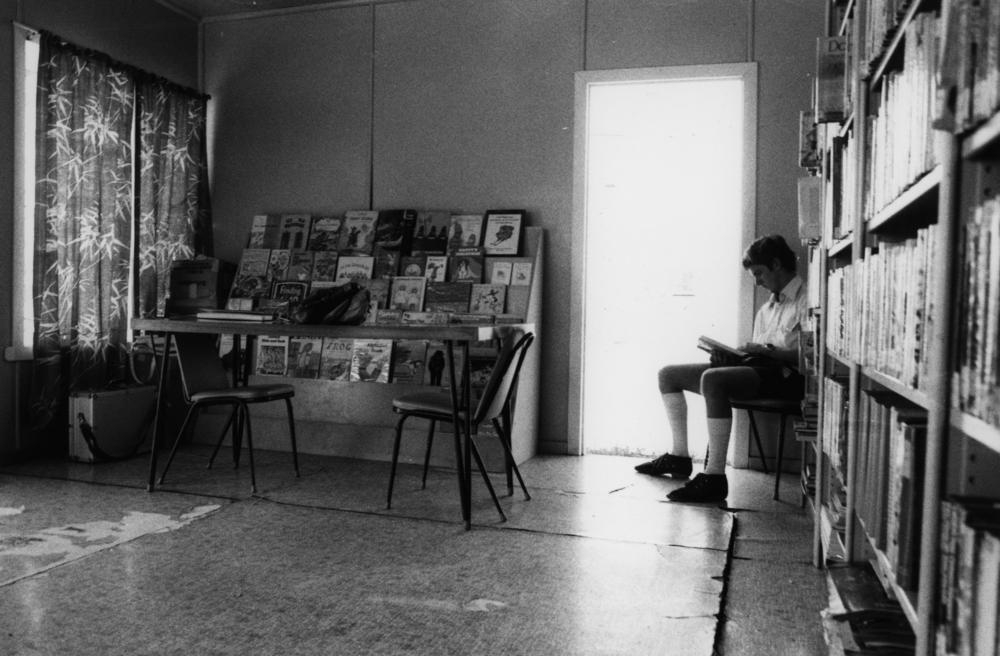
Inside McKinlay library

The McKinlay Shire Council operates a public library at Middleton Street; it is claimed to be Queensland's smallest public library. It also serves as the town's Visitor Information Centre.

The McKinlay branch of the Queensland Country Women's Association has its rooms at 22 Middleton Street.

Regular services by the Uniting Church in Australia are held in the QCWA rooms. These are provided by the McKay Patrol, an aerial service of the Uniting Church in Australia that operates out of Cloncurry. Supported by other denominations, the McKay Patrol operates a Cessna 182Q aeroplane to provide spiritual and practical help to people living in remote areas in the north-west of Queensland and the eastern Tablelands of the Northern Territory, an area of approximately 625,000 square kilometres (241,000 sq mi) with a population of less than 10,000 people.

== Attractions ==
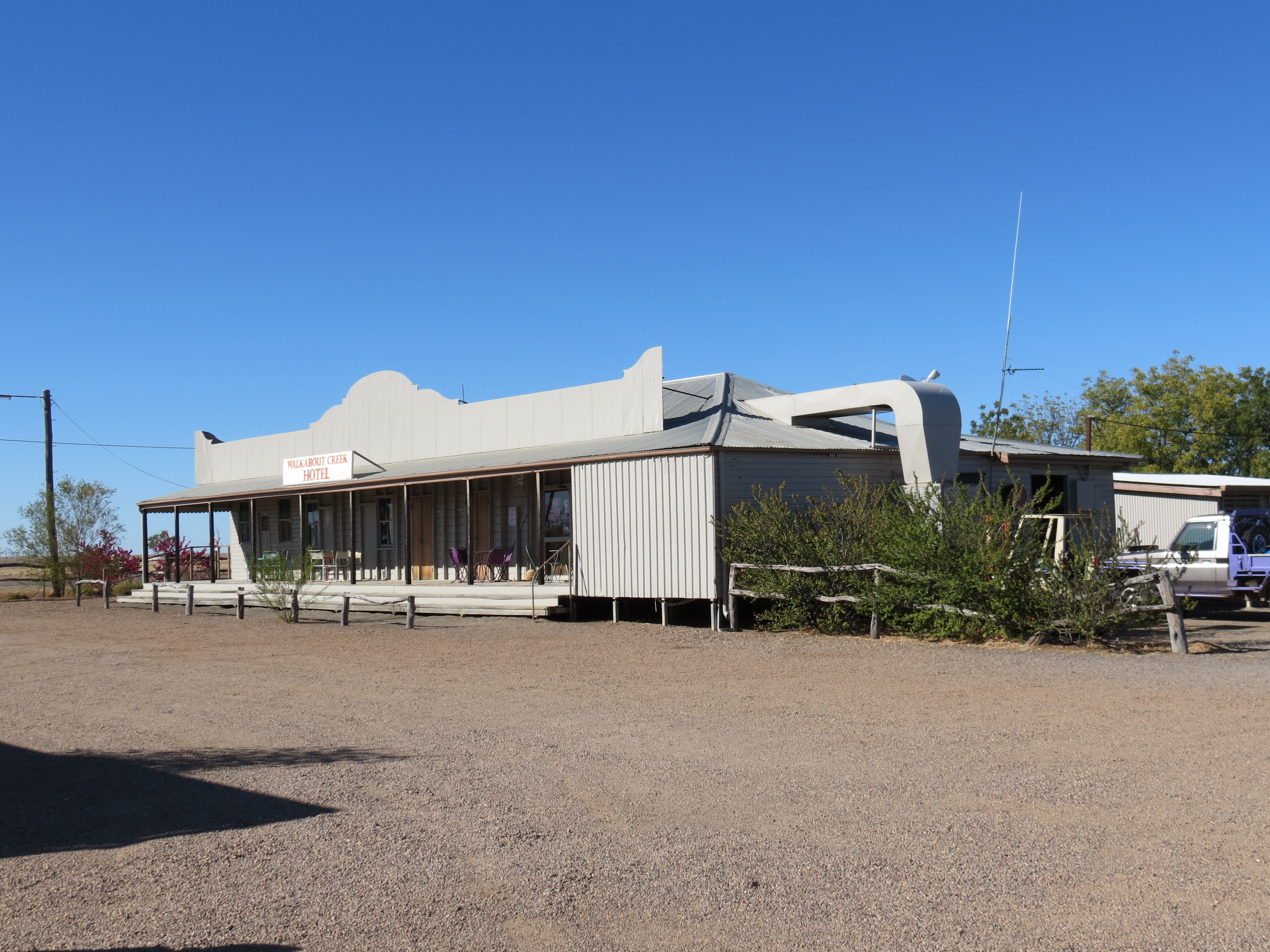
Walkabout Creek Hotel, 2013

The town is best known for the Walkabout Creek Hotel, featured in the movie Crocodile Dundee. The pub operates from the former McKinlay Shire Hall It has become a major tourism draw for the town and, when put up for sale in 2010, attracted worldwide interest.
