= Julia Creek, Queensland =

Julia Creek
- Town
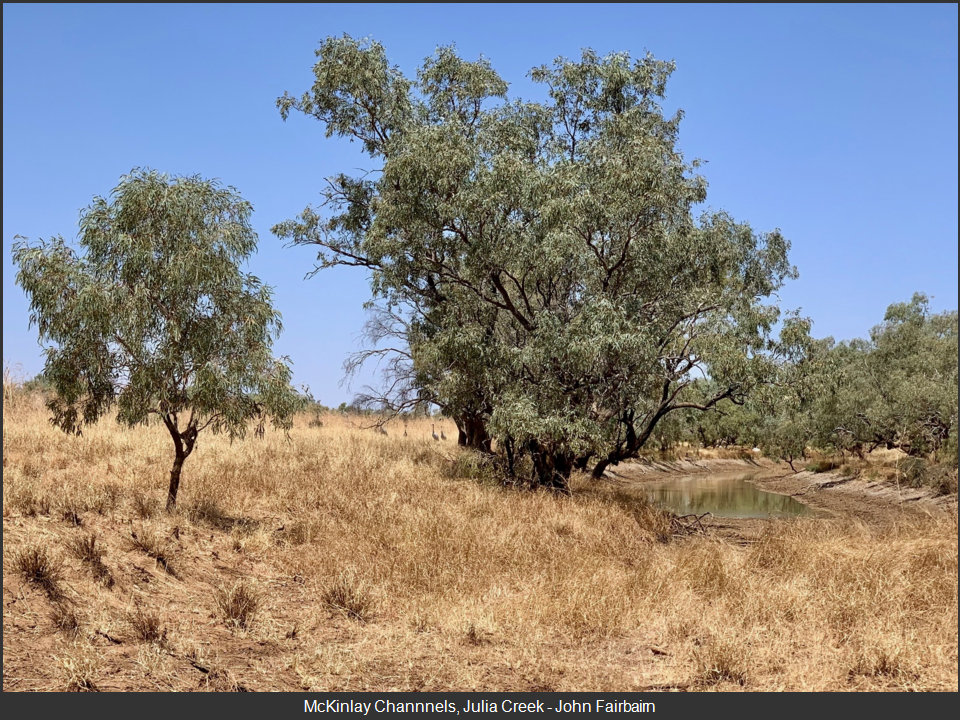
- McKinlay channels, Julia Creek, 2020

- Interactive map of Julia Creek
- Coordinates: 20.6563°S 141.7436°E
- Country: Australia
- State: Queensland
- LGA: Mckinlay
- Location: 138 km (86 mi) E of Cloncurry; 258 km (160 mi) E of Mount Isa; 467 km (290 mi) WSW of Townsville; 1,603 km (996 mi) NW of Brisbane

Government
  - State electorate: Traeger
  - Federal division: Kennedy

Area
  - Total: 6,186.2 km^{2} (2,388.5 sq mi)
- Elevation: 123 m (404 ft)

Population
  - Total: 549 (2021 census)
  - Density: 0.08875/km^{2} (0.22985/sq mi)
- Time zone: UTC+10:00 (AEST)
- Postcode: 4823
- Mean max temp: 33.3 °C (91.9 °F)
- Mean min temp: 17.4 °C (63.3 °F)
- Annual rainfall: 461.3 mm (18.16 in)
Localities around Julia Creek
Taldora	Taldora	Malpas-Trenton
Cloncurry	Julia Creek	Maxwelton
Mckinlay	Mckinlay	Kynuna

Julia Creek is an outback town and locality in the Shire of Mckinlay, Queensland, Australia. In the 2021 census, the locality of Julia Creek had a population of 549 people.

The town of Oorindi is within the west of the locality (20.6913°S 141.0741°E) beside the Oorindi railway station; as at 2019, there is nothing in the town. The town of Gilliat is within the west of the locality (20.6866°S 141.5011°E) beside the Gilliat railway station; as at 2019, there is nothing in the town.

== Geography ==
Julia Creek is a town in mid-northern Queensland, located on the Flinders Highway (Overlanders Way), the main road between Mount Isa and Townsville. It is 664 kilometres (413 mi) west of Townsville, and is located 123 m above sea level.

The town of Julia Creek is on the Great Northern Railway; the locality being served by a number of railway stations (from west to east):

- Oorindi railway station (20.6934°S 141.0744°E)
- Bookin railway station, now abandoned (20.6972°S 141.1864°E)
- Tibarri railway station is a railway station (20.7032°S 141.3029°E)
- Gilliat railway station (20.6913°S 141.4992°E)
- Eddington railway station, now abandoned (20.6705°S 141.6291°E)
- Gunjoola railway station (20.6619°S 141.7177°E)
- Julia Creek railway station, serving the town (20.6590°S 141.7467°E)
- Quarrells railway station (20.6533°S 141.9828°E)
- Nelia railway station (20.6539°S 142.2147°E)

=== Climate ===
Julia Creek experiences a hot semi-arid climate (Köppen: BSh), with a short, erratic wet season from December to March; and a long, relatively cooler dry season from April to November. Although average maxima remain warm to hot year-round, average minima have greater variation: from 9.1 °C (48.4 °F) in July to 23.8 °C (74.8 °F) in January. Average annual rainfall is low, 463.7 mm (18.26 in), and is extremely unpredictable, evident by the 738.6 mm (29.08 in) of rain recorded in January 1974 alone. The town is very sunny, averaging 175.1 clear days and only 37.4 cloudy days annually. Extreme temperatures have ranged from −0.9 °C (30.4 °F) on 25 June 1965 to 46.5 °C (115.7 °F) on 9 November 1965.

Climate data for Julia Creek (20º39'36"S, 141º45'00"E, 123 m AMSL) (1965-2001 normals and extremes, rainfall 1912-2011)
Month	Jan	Feb	Mar	Apr	May	Jun	Jul	Aug	Sep	Oct	Nov	Dec	Year
Record high °C (°F)	45.6 (114.1)	45.0 (113.0)	41.5 (106.7)	39.8 (103.6)	36.0 (96.8)	34.5 (94.1)	36.0 (96.8)	37.8 (100.0)	41.2 (106.2)	44.7 (112.5)	46.5 (115.7)	45.0 (113.0)	46.5 (115.7)
Mean daily maximum °C (°F)	37.6 (99.7)	36.4 (97.5)	35.6 (96.1)	33.5 (92.3)	29.7 (85.5)	26.8 (80.2)	26.5 (79.7)	29.0 (84.2)	32.5 (90.5)	36.0 (96.8)	37.9 (100.2)	38.3 (100.9)	33.3 (92.0)
Mean daily minimum °C (°F)	23.8 (74.8)	23.6 (74.5)	21.5 (70.7)	18.2 (64.8)	14.3 (57.7)	10.3 (50.5)	9.1 (48.4)	10.9 (51.6)	14.4 (57.9)	18.7 (65.7)	21.3 (70.3)	23.0 (73.4)	17.4 (63.4)
Record low °C (°F)	15.0 (59.0)	16.3 (61.3)	10.5 (50.9)	6.7 (44.1)	1.9 (35.4)	−0.9 (30.4)	0.0 (32.0)	1.9 (35.4)	3.0 (37.4)	5.5 (41.9)	8.9 (48.0)	13.0 (55.4)	−0.9 (30.4)
Average precipitation mm (inches)	128.3 (5.05)	112.9 (4.44)	56.0 (2.20)	16.8 (0.66)	14.8 (0.58)	11.7 (0.46)	7.7 (0.30)	2.4 (0.09)	5.5 (0.22)	15.6 (0.61)	30.4 (1.20)	67.6 (2.66)	463.7 (18.26)
Average precipitation days (≥ 1.0 mm)	7.2	6.6	3.5	1.2	1.1	0.9	0.7	0.4	0.7	1.5	2.8	4.9	31.5
Average afternoon relative humidity (%)	39	42	36	30	33	31	27	24	21	22	25	29	30
Average dew point °C (°F)	17.3 (63.1)	18.0 (64.4)	15.8 (60.4)	11.3 (52.3)	9.5 (49.1)	6.5 (43.7)	4.1 (39.4)	4.2 (39.6)	4.6 (40.3)	8.1 (46.6)	10.8 (51.4)	13.7 (56.7)	10.3 (50.6)
Source: Bureau of Meteorology (1965-2001 normals and extremes, rainfall 1912-2011)

== History ==
The name Julia Creek was named after the niece of Donald McIntyre (younger brother of explorer Duncan McIntyre), the first white settler in the area. McIntyre took up a property called Dalgonally about 70 kilometres (43 mi) north of the present site of the town in 1864, only a few years after the ill-fated Burke and Wills expedition passed through the area.

The township began life as a temporary railway terminus in 1907 when the Great Northern railway line was extended from Richmond to service the copper mines at Cloncurry.

The name Oorindi is the Aboriginal name for the Williams River (which is about 12 kilometres [7.5 mi] west of Oorindi) and means stones.

Julia Creek Post Office opened by September 1910 (a receiving office had been open from 1907).

Julia Creek State School was a one-room school established in 1911 with nine students, and was expanded in 1932 and again in 1934. A separate high school was constructed in 1963.

In 1952, the town was serviced with electricity.

St Joseph's School opened in 1955 and closed in 1995.

A sixteen-bed hospital was established in 1972.

Julia Creek Public Library was opened in 1994.

The Dirt n Dust Festival sporting and music festival was held in the town annually from 1995 to 2019 and was considered one of Queensland's largest events of its type. After cancellations in 2020 and 2021 due to the COVID-19 pandemic, it was announced in July 2021 that due to a lack of volunteers, and there being no committee to run the event, the Dirt n Dust Festival would no longer be held. But in December 2021, an organising committee was formed and the 2022 festival was held on 22-24 April and continues to be held annually.

In 2022, Julia Creek made headlines by its inability to attract a doctor for general practice work in the town for over 2 years, despite offering an annual salary of over $500,000 and providing a rent-free house. The position was filled in December 2022.

== Demographics ==
In the 2016 census. the locality of Julia Creek had a population of 511 people.

In the 2021 census, the locality of Julia Creek had a population of 549 people.

== Economy ==
The town's main industries are farming, (especially the beef and wool industries), and mining, which is mainly centred on the South32 mine at nearby Cannington. The town is a major centre for cattle sales and stock trucking, with a large saleyard and associated facilities. Prior to the expansion of the railway to the larger towns of Cloncurry and Mount Isa, the town was also a major transport hub for freight and passengers.

== Environment ==
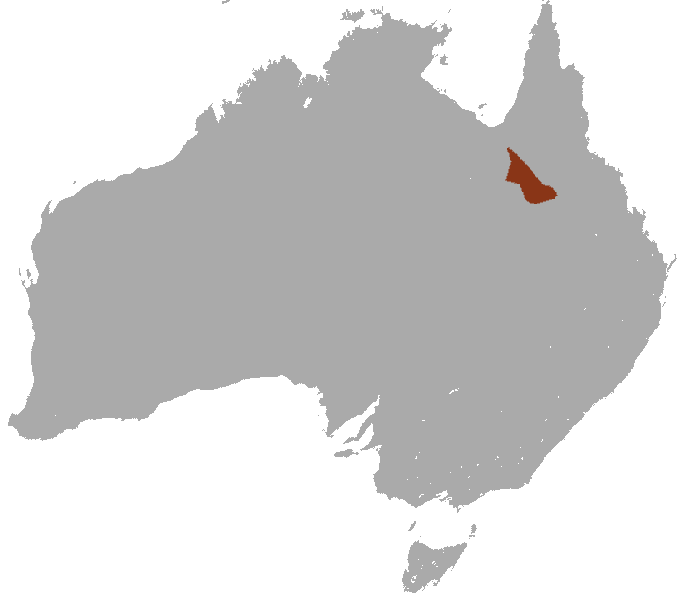
Julia Creek dunnart area

Julia Creek is also home to the Julia Creek dunnart which is now endangered because of feral animals (wild cats, dogs and foxes).

== Education ==
Julia Creek State School is a government primary (Prep–6) school for boys and girls on Burke Street (20.6568°S 141.7463°E). In 2017, the school had an enrolment of 34 students with 3 teachers and 4 non-teaching staff (3 full-time equivalent).

There are no secondary schools in Julia Creek. The nearest government secondary schools are Richmond State School in Richmond (only to Year 10) and Cloncurry State School in Cloncurry (to Year 12), but, given the distances, the alternatives are distance education and boarding school.

== Amenities ==
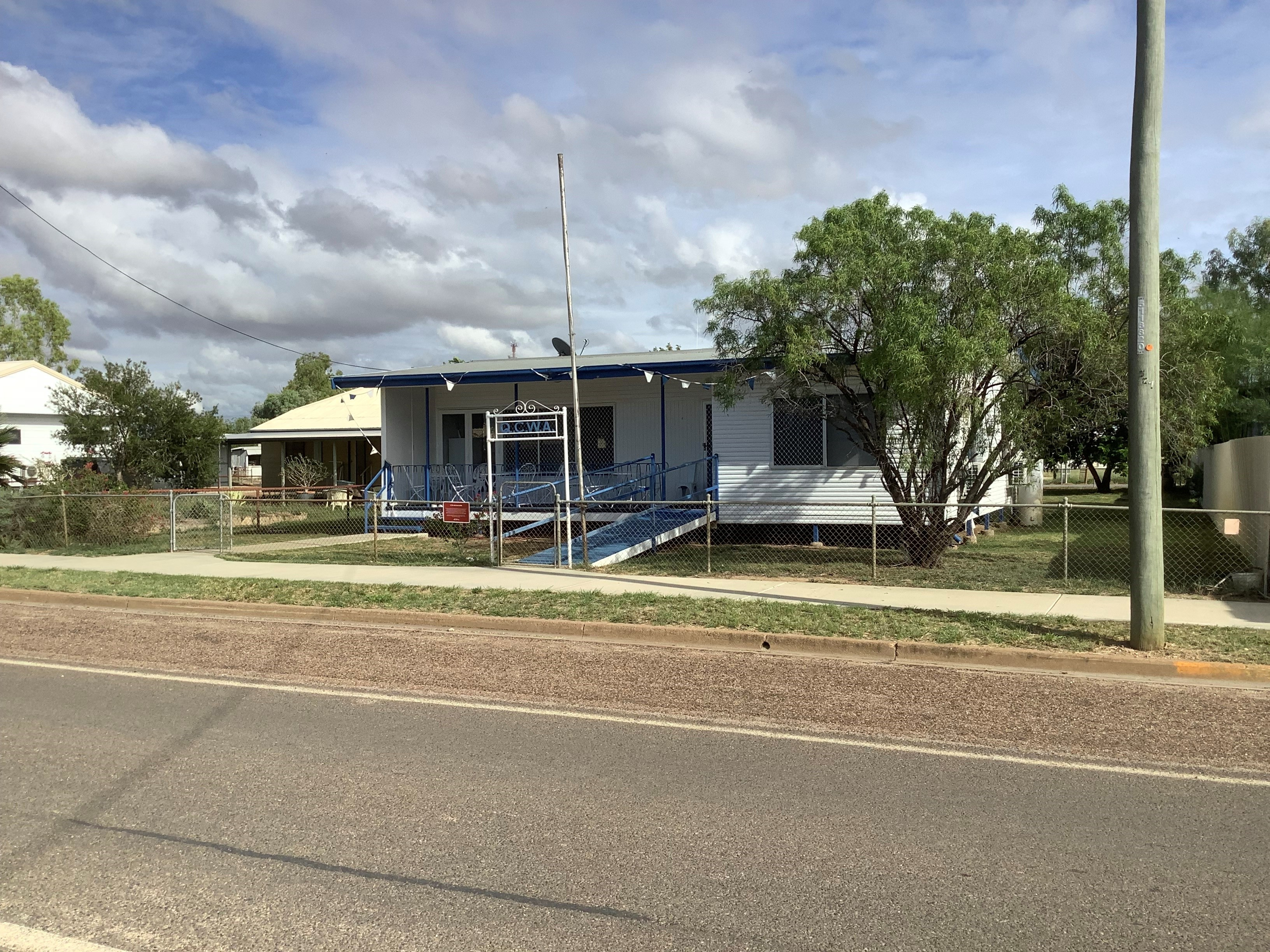
Country Women's Association, 2023

The Mckinlay Shire Council operates a public library in Julia Creek at 56 Burke Street.

The Julia Creek branch of the Queensland Country Women's Association has its rooms at 51 Burke Street.

St Barnabas Anglican Church is at 1 Burke Street. Anglican services recommenced in 2020.

Regular services by the Uniting Church in Australia are held in St Baranabas Anglican Church. These are provided by the McKay Patrol, an aerial service of the Uniting Church in Australia that operates out of Cloncurry. Supported by other denominations, the McKay Patrol operates a Cessna 182Q aeroplane to provide spiritual and practical help to people living in remote areas in the north-west of Queensland and the eastern Tablelands of the Northern Territory, an area of approximately 625,000 square kilometres (241,000 sq mi) with a population of fewer than 10,000 people.

Julia Creek also has a visitor and cultural centre, swimming pool, tennis courts, parks as well as a sports centre.

== Events ==
Julia Creek hosts the annual Dirt n Dust Festival. The next event is to be held in 2027.

== Transport ==
Preceding station	Queensland Rail	Following station
Long distance rail services
Richmond towards Townsville	The Inlander	Cloncurry towards Mount Isa
