= Shire of McKinlay =

Coordinates: 20°39′24″S 141°44′44″E

- Local government area
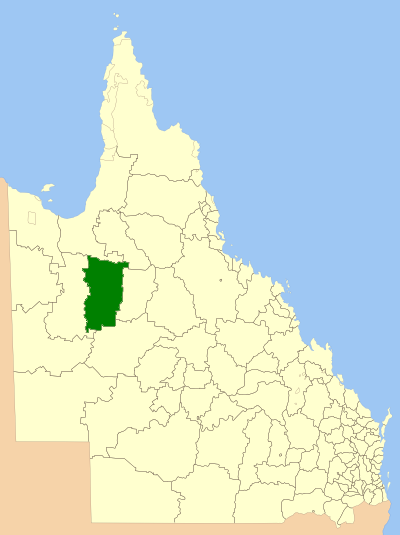
- Location within Queensland

- Interactive map of Shire of McKinlay
- Country: Australia
- State: Queensland
- Region: North West Queensland
- Established: 1891
- Council seat: Julia Creek

Government
  - Mayor: Philip Roland Curr
  - State electorate: Traeger
  - Federal division: Kennedy

Area
  - Total: 40,737 km^{2} (15,729 sq mi)

Population
  - Total: 836 (2021 census)
  - Density: 0.020522/km^{2} (0.05315/sq mi)
- Website: Shire of McKinlay
LGAs around Shire of McKinlay
Carpentaria	Carpentaria	Croydon
Cloncurry	Shire of McKinlay	Richmond
Cloncurry	Winton	Winton

The Shire of McKinlay is a local government area in outback north-western Queensland, Australia.

It covers an area of 40,737 square kilometres (15,728.6 sq mi), and has existed as a local government entity since 1891. The shire economy is based on beef production and mining. BHP operate the Cannington Mine in the shire, extracting silver, lead and zinc.

In the 2021 census, the Shire of McKinlay had a population of 836 people.

== History ==
Wanamarra (also known as Maykulan and Wunumura is an Australian Aboriginal language in North West Queensland. The language region includes areas within the Shire of McKinlay, Shire of Cloncurry and Shire of Richmond, including the Flinders River area, and the towns of Kynuna and Richmond.

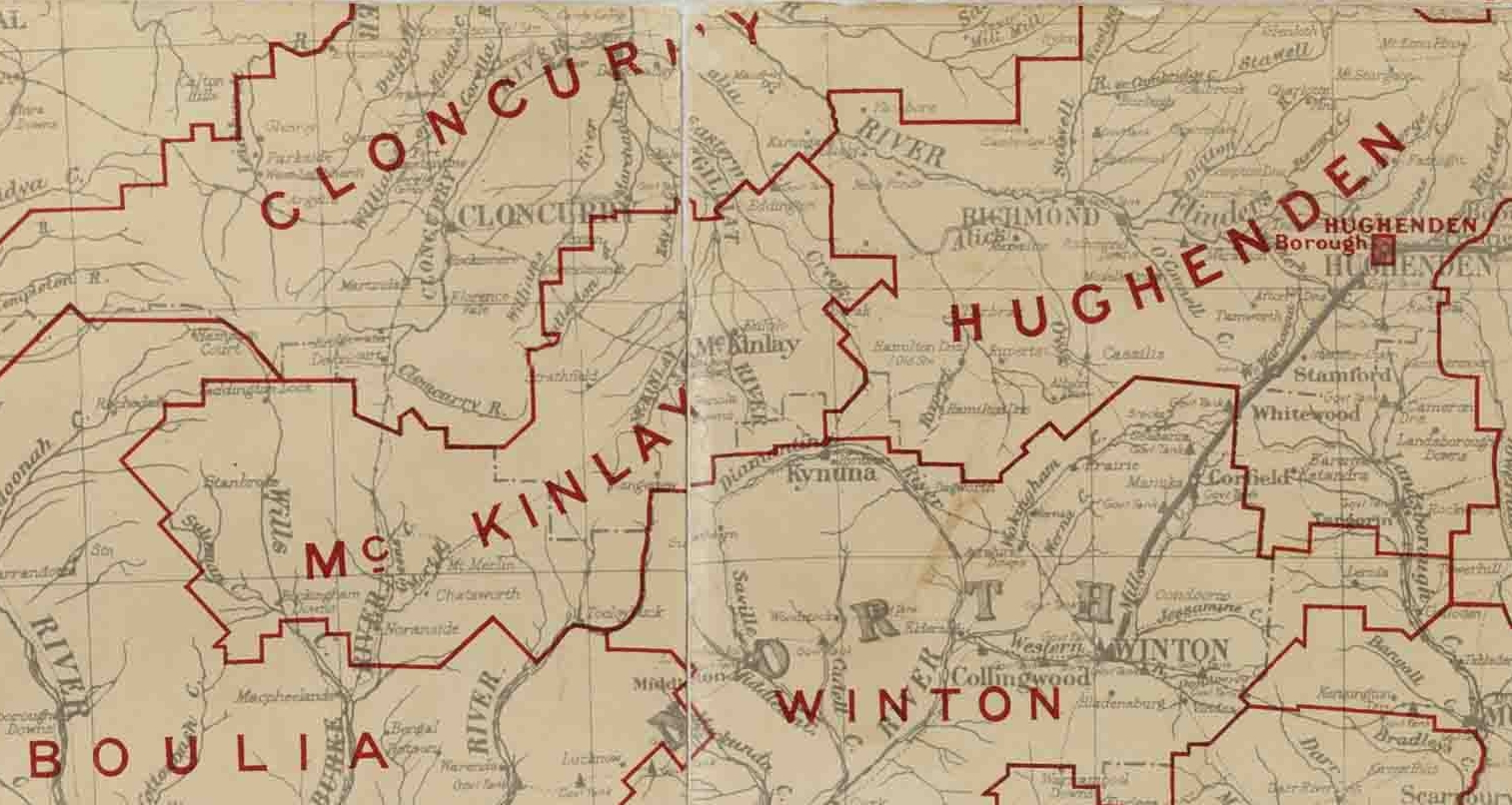
Map of McKinlay Division and adjacent local government areas, March 1902

The Mackinlay Division was created on 9 December 1891 out of parts of Boulia and Cloncurry under the Divisional Boards Act 1887.

With the passage of the Local Authorities Act 1902, Mackinlay Division became the Shire of Mackinlay on 31 March 1903.

In 1932, the spelling of the shire's name was altered to be Shire of McKinlay, as the shire was named after the explorer John McKinlay.

On 24 July 1930, it was abolished and a new Shire of McKinlay was formed from parts of the Shires of Cloncurry, McKinlay, Winton and Wyangarie (Richmond).

== Towns and localities ==
The Shire of McKinlay includes the following settlements:

- Julia Creek
- Cannington
- Kynuna
- McKinlay
- Nelia

== Amenities ==
The McKinlay Shire Council operates public libraries at Julia Creek and McKinlay.

== Chairmen and mayors ==
- 1927: W. M. Allison
- 2008–2012: Paul Woodhouse
- 2012–2020 : Belinda Murphy
- 2020–present: Philip Roland Curr

== Election results ==
=== 2024 ===
2024 Queensland local elections: McKinlay
Party	Candidate	Votes	%	±%
Independent	Fiona Malone			
Independent	Shauna Royes			
Independent	Michele Zadow			
Independent	Sheree Pratt			
Independent	John Lynch			
Independent	Amanda Stevens			
Independent	Luke Spreadborough			
Turnout				

== Demographics ==
Year	Population	Notes
1933	1,899	
1947	1,633	
1954	1,647	
1961	2,132	
1966	1,701	
1971	1,582	
1976	1,468	
1981	1,477	
1986	1,446	
1991	1,306	
1996	1,423	
2001 census	1,361	
2006 census	898	
2011 census	1,050	
2016 census	796	
2021 census	836	
