= List of tourist drives in Queensland =

List of tourist drives in Queensland includes numbered and un-numbered routes. Most routes have an official name, but some have been named in this article based on the region in which they occur. Some duplication of numbers exists where the Queensland Government and a local authority have each chosen the same number for use in different regions. General information about tourist drives in Queensland can be found here: .

Unless stated otherwise, all distance and road name information in this article is derived from Google Maps.

== Strategic touring routes ==
State Strategic Touring Routes are road routes in Queensland, Australia, which have been identified as significant to motoring tourists. These are the primary routes used by tourists as they provide the connections between popular tourist locations, and consequently have high volumes of tourist traffic. Standardised road signage is used to identify the route itself, with "Welcome to" signage at towns and districts of interest to tourists, as well as "turn off" signage to natural attractions.

Route	Component roads and streets	From	Via	To	Length	Notes ↑ (Top)
Adventure Way	Ipswich Motorway; Warrego Highway; Moonie Highway; Balonne Highway; Bulloo Developmental Road; Bundeena Road; Innamincka Road	Brisbane	Toowoomba, Dalby, St George, Cunnamulla, Thargomindah	Durham	1,152 km (715.8 mi)	Continues to Innamincka, South Australia. Length (from reference) is from Brisbane to Innamincka.
Australia's Country Way	Burnett Highway; Bunya Highway; D'Aguilar Highway; New England Highway	Rockhampton	Monto, Wondai, Kingaroy, Yarraman, Toowoomba, Warwick	Wallangarra	1,615 km (1,003.5 mi)	Continues to Sydney. Length (from reference) is from Rockhampton to Sydney.
Capricorn Way	Capricorn Highway	Rockhampton	Duaringa, Blackwater, Emerald, The Gemfields, Alpha	Barcaldine	579 km (359.8 mi)	Length is from reference.
Great Inland Way	Castlereagh Highway; Carnarvon Highway; Dawson Highway; Gregory Highway; Kennedy Developmental Road / Kennedy Highway; East Evelyn Road; Malanda Millaa Millaa Road; Atherton Malanda Road; Gillies Range Road; Bruce Highway	Hebel	St George, Rolleston, Springsure, Conjuboy, Evelyn, Gordonvale	Cairns		Continues from Hebel to Sydney.
Leichhardt Way	Leichhardt Highway; Capricorn Highway; Bruce Highway	Goondiwindi	Miles, Banana, Dululu, Westwood	Rockhampton		Continues from Goondiwindi to Melbourne.
Matilda Way	Karumba Road; Burke Developmental Road; Landsborough Highway; Mitchell Highway	Karumba	Howitt, Cloncurry, Longreach, Augathella	Barringun		Continues to Bourke, New South Wales.
Overlanders Way	Flinders Highway; Barkly Highway	Townsville	Charters Towers, Hughenden, Richmond, Julia Creek, Cloncurry, Mount Isa	Camooweal		Continues to Tennant Creek, Northern Territory.
Pacific Coast Way	Bruce Highway; Gateway Motorway; Pacific Motorway	Cairns	Townsville, Mackay, Gympie, Brisbane	Coolangatta		Continues to Sydney.
Savannah Way	Sheridan Street; Captain Cook Highway; Kennedy Highway; Gulf Developmental Road; Burke Developmental Road; Burketown Normanton Road; Nardoo Burketown Road; Wills Developmental Road; Doomadgee Road	Cairns	Atherton; Mt Surprise; Georgetown; Croydon; Normanton; Burketown; Doomadgee	Hells Gate Roadhouse		Continues to Broome, Western Australia. Alternate Routes: 40 Mile Scrub, Forsayth, Einasleigh, Georgetown; Mt Surprise, Chillagoe, Normanton; Burketown, Boodjamulla (Lawn Hill), Doomadgee
Warrego Way	Warrego Highway; Birdsville Developmental Road	Brisbane	Charleville	Birdsville	1,578 km (980.5 mi)	Length from reference.

== Un-numbered tourist drives ==
Route	Component roads and streets	From	Via	To	Length	Notes ↑ (Top)
Brisbane Valley Drive	Brisbane Valley Highway; D'Aguilar Highway	Blacksoil	Fernvale; Esk; Toogoolawah; Blackbutt	Yarraman		
The Canecutter Way		Kurrimine Beach	Mena Creek; Paronella Park; Mamu Tropical Skywalk	Innisfail		
Cobb and Co Tourist Drive		Ipswich	Grandchester	Toowoomba	120 km (74.6 mi)	Length from reference.
Dingo Barrier Fence Drive	Dalby Jandowae Road; Lyndley Connection Road; Lyndley Lane; Fletchers Road	Jandowae			110 km (68.4 mi)	
Granite Belt Drive	Granite Belt Drive	Dalveen	Cottonvale, Thulimbah	The Summit	12 km (7.5 mi)	Loop route from and to New England Highway. Length from reference. Signed as
Great Barrier Reef Tourist Drive	Captain Cook Highway; Mossman–Daintree Road; Cape Tribulation Road	Smithfield, Cairns	Rex Lookout; Four Mile Beach, Port Douglas; Mossman Gorge; Alexandra Lookout	Cape Tribulation	125 km (77.7 mi)	
Great Bunya Drive	Toowoomba Connection Road; Warrego Highway; Dalby Jandowae Road; MacAllister Bell Road; Bunya Highway; Bunya Mountains Road; Maidenwell Bunya Mountain Road; Kingaroy Cooyar Road; Nanango Tarong Road; D’Aguilar Highway; Bunya Highway; Wide Bay Highway; Bruce Highway	Toowoomba	Dalby, Bunya Mountains, Nanango, Kingaroy, Wondai, Murgon, Goomeri	Gympie	324 km (201.3 mi)	Length from reference.
Hibiscus Coast Tourist Drive	Bruce Highway; Mount Ossa–Seaforth Road; Yakapari–Seaforth Road; Cape Hillsborough Road; Kuttabul–Mount Jukes Road	The Leap (Mackay)	Calen	Mount Jukes; Seaforth; Haliday Bay; Cape Hillsborough; Kuttabul		
Mission Beach Drive	Tully Mission Beach Road; El Arish Mission Beach Road	Tully	Mission Beach	El Arish		
Northern Moreton Bay Tourist Drive	Anzac Avenue; Klinger Road; Boardman Road; Griffith Road; Newport Drive; Endeavour Esplanade; Oyster Point Esplanade; Thurecht Parade; Bird O'Passage Parade; Reef Point Esplanade; Second Avenue (Scarborough); Fortune Street; Fifth Avenue; Landsborough Avenue; Kennedy Esplanade; Flinders Parade; Griffith Road; Prince Edward Parade; Redcliffe Parade; Marine Parade; Margate Parade; Whytecliffe Parade; Gayundah Esplanade; Lilla Street; Woodcliffe Crescent; Oxley Avenue; Hornibrook Esplanade; Houghton Highway; Hornibrook Highway; Beaconsfield Terrace; Nineteenth Avenue; Flinders Parade; Cliff Street; Second Avenue (Sandgate); Brighton Road; Bowser Parade (northbound only); Seymour Street; Eagle Terrace; Park Parade; Swan Street; Shorncliffe Parade; Allpass Parade; Sinbad Street; Palm Avenue; Rainbow Street; Board Street	Rothwell	Redcliffe	Deagon	36 km (22.4 mi)	Length from reference.
Pioneer Valley Drive	Mackay–Eungella Road; State Route 5; Gorge Road; Eungella Dam Rd	Walkerston (Mackay)	Broken River, Eungella National Park	Marian, (Eton), (Kuttabul), Kinchant Dam, Mirani, Cattle Creek, Pinnacle, Finch Hatton Gorge, Eungella	122km	
Shearer's Way	Connor Street; Stanthorpe–Texas Road (Texas Road); Glenlyon Dam Road; Pinnacle Road; Riverton Road	Stanthorpe	Glenlyon	Texas		Extension of Tourist Drive 8 from Glenlyon Dam to Texas. Signed as
Southern Moreton Bay Tourist Drive		Wynnum	Cleveland	Redlands	78 km (48.5 mi)	Length from reference.
Warrego Way through Gatton	Eastern Drive; Railway Street; Western Drive; Gatton Helidon Road	Gatton	Grantham	Helidon		Former alignment of the Warrego Highway. Part of it is signed as

== Numbered tourist drives ==
Route	Component roads and streets	From	Via	To	Length	Notes ↑ (Top)
Tourist Drive 1 Settlers’ Route	Warwick Killarney Road; Yangan Killarney Road; Warwick Yangan Road	Warwick	Killarney	Warwick	72 km (44.7 mi)	Loop route
Tourist Drive 1 Toowoomba Lookout Tourist Drive	Bridge Street; Prince Henry Drive; Dudley Street; Campbell Street; Wirra Wirra Street; Sinclair Street; Freemantle Street; Mayes Street; Dawnie Street; Tourist Road; Cohoe Street; James Street; Tourist Road; Heller Street; Leslie Street; Collier Street; Rowbotham Street; Alderley Street; Ramsay Street; Stenner Street; West Street; Baker St; Ball St; Gipps St; Brisbane St	Toowoomba		Toowoomba		
Tourist Drive 1 McConnell Lookout Tourist Drive	Burnett Highway; Mount Debatable Road; Renay Robinson Drive	Gayndah		Dirnbir		
Tourist Drive 2 Paradise Dam Tourist Drive	Goodnight Road; Kalliwa Road	Goodnight		Paradise Dam	46 km (28.6 mi)	Some sections are 4WD Only, Goes through Goodnight National Park
Tourist Drive 3 Border Rivers	Kildonan Road; Yelarbon Keetah Road	Goondiwindi		Yelarbon		
Tourist Drive 3 Cambooya	Nelson Street; West Street; Charker Street; Rocklyn Street; Postle Street; Tranter Street; Kearney Street; New England Highway; Preston Boundary Road; Wilsons Road; Sawpit Road; Hodgson Vale Road; New England Highway; Cambooya Connection Road; Eton Street; Railway Street; Toowoomba Karara Road; Balfour Street; Newman Road; Drayton Connection Road; Brisbane Street; Canning Street	Toowoomba	Cambooya	Toowoomba		Loop route
Tourist Drive 3 Green Mountains	Kidston Street; Lammington National Park Road	Canungra		Lammington National Park		
Tourist Drive 3 Bucca	Bucca Crossing Road; Bostons Road; N Bucca Road	Bucca		Avondale		
Tourist Drive 3 Country Insight Drive	Warrego Highway; Jackson Wandoan Road; Crossroads Road; Horse Creek Road; Yuleba-Taroom Road	Jackson	Jackson North; Yuleba North	Yuleba		
Tourist Drive 4 Darling Downs	Cudmores Road; McGovern Road; Nunkulla Road; Felton Clifton Road; Mount Kent Boundary Road; Felton Clifton Road; Gatton Clifton Road; New England Highway; Greenmount Hirstvale Road; Budgee Road; Greenmount Budgee Road; Greenmount Clifton Road; Greenmount Etonvale Road; New England Highway	Cambooya	Clifton	Cambooya		Loop route. Much longer southern extension of Tourist Drive 3 (Cambooya)
Tourist Drive 4 Fairbairn Dam	Selma Road; Fairbairn Dam Road	Emerald		Fairbairn Dam		Loops back to Emerald via Gregory Hwy, Central Highlands Tourist Drive 4
Tourist Drive 4 Tinaroo Falls Tourist Drive	Tinaroo Falls Dam Road; Danbulla Road; Boar Pocket Road; Giles Range Road	Atherton	Tinaroo	Danbulla		Loops back to Atherton via Giles Range Road
Tourist Drive 5 Amiens	Connor Street; Stanthorpe–Texas Road (Texas Road); Amiens Road	Stanthorpe	Amiens	Thulimbah		
Tourist Drive 6 Bauple Tourist Drive	Bauple–Woolooga Road; Bauple Drive	A1 Bruce Highway	Bauple	A1 Bruce Highway	11 km (6.8 mi)	
Tourist Drive 6 Highland Drive	Sugarloaf Road; Eukey Road	Stanthorpe	Eukey	Ballandean		
Tourist Drive 6 Boolboonda Tunnel Tourist Drive	Gin Gin Mount Perry Road; Tunnel Road; Gin Gin Mount Perry Road	Gin Gin	Boolboonda	Mount Perry		Travels through the Boolboonda Tunnel
Tourist Drive 7 Mount Coot–tha	Mount Coot-tha Road; Scenic Drive; Sir Samuel Griffith Drive	Toowong	Mount Coot-tha & Bardon	Toowong	7 km (4.3 mi)	Loop route
Tourist Drive 7 Oracle's Way	Amosfield Road; Mount Lindesay Road; Logan Street; Naas Street; New England Highway; Wallangarra Road	Stanthorpe	Amosfield, NSW	Tenterfield, NSW		Loop route. Enter NSW at Dalcouth.
Tourist Drive 7 Anakie-Sapphire	Anakie Sapphire Road; Rubyvale Road; Rubyvale Capella Road	Anakie Siding	Sapphire Central	Capella		Central Highlands Tourist Drive 7
Tourist Drive 8 Glenlyon Dam	Connor Street; Stanthorpe–Texas Road (Texas Road); Glenlyon Dam Road	Stanthorpe	Glenlyon	Mingoola		
Tourist Drive 8 Tamborine Mountain	Tamborine Oxenford Road; Macdonnell Road; Long Road; Lahey Road; Main Western Road; Geissmann Drive (part); Tamborine Mountain Road; Beaudesert Beenleigh Road; Mundoolun Connection Road; Beaudesert–Nerang Road; Mount Nathan Road	Oxenford	Mount Tamborine, Canungra	Nerang		Also signed at the Junction of the Mount Lindsey Hwy and Beaudesert Nerang Road in Beaudesert
Tourist Drive 8 Arcadia Valley Loop	Carnaravon Highway; Arcadia Valley Road; Mulcahys Road	Baffle West		Arcadia Valley		Loops Route
Tourist Drive 8 Mount Nebo	Mount Nebo Road	The Gap		Mount Nebo		Goes Through Mount Nebo, End at Intersection with Tourist Drive 9
Tourist Drive 8 Clermont-Goldfields	Clermont-Rubyvale Road	Clermont		Rubyvale		Central Highlands Tourist Drive 8
Tourist Drive 9 Mount Glorious	Samford Road; Mount Glorious Road; Mount Glorious Road; Northbrook Parkway	Ferny Hills	Mount Glorious	Lake Wivenhoe		
Tourist Drive 10 Capricorn Coast	Bridge Street; Lakes Creek Road; Emu Park Road; Hill Street; Pattison Street; Scenic Highway; Yeppoon Road; Yaamba Road (Bruce Highway); Musgrave Street; Queen Elizabeth Drive	Berserker	Emu Park and Yeppoon	Berserker	103 km (64.0 mi)	This is a circular route from and to the northern end of the Fitzroy Bridge in Rockhampton. It is also signed as.
Tourist Drive 11 The Sunflower Route	Rosehill Road; Warwick Allora Road; Alldridge Road; East Street; Forde Street; Allora Drive; New England Highway	Warwick	Allora	Warwick		Loop route
Tourist Drive 12 Fraser Coast	Gympie Road; Ferry Street; Ann Street; Lions Drive; Queen Street; Neptune Street; Alice Street; Pallas Street; Kent Street; Lennox Street; Woodstock Street; Saltwater Creek Road; Maryborough–Hervey Bay Road; Booral Road; Elizabeth Street; Boat Harbour Drive; Charlton Esplanade; Miller Street; Pulgul Street; Kent Street; King Street; Elizabeth Street; The Esplanade; Martin Street; Tooth Street; Old Maryborough Road; Maryborough–Hervey Bay Road; Pialba–Burrum Heads Road; Burrum Heads Road; Old Bruce Highway; Steley Street; William Street	Maryborough	Hervey Bay	Howard		From Bruce Highway, Tinana to Bruce Highway, Howard
Tourist Drive 12 The Sprint Route	Cunningham Highway; Toowoomba Karara Road; Leyburn Cunningham Road; Sandy Creek Road	Warwick	Leyburn	Warwick		Loop route
Tourist Drive 14 The Cedar Route	Warwick Yangan Road; Kay Road; Freestone Road; Cunningham Highway; Clintonvale Goomburra Road; Goomburra Road; New England Highway	Warwick	Goomburra	Warwick		Loop route
Tourist Drive 14	Bruce Highway; Captain Cook Highway; Mossman Mount Molloy Road; Mulligan Highway	Gordonvale	Mossman	Mareeba		Part of the Great Barrier Reef Tourist Drive
Tourist Drive 16 Scenic Rim	Queen Street; Rosewood Marburg Road; Waight Street; John Street; School Street; Ipswich Rosewood Road; Cunningham Highway; Middle Road; Peak Crossing Churchbank Weir Road; Ipswich–Boonah Road; Boonah–Rathdowney Road; Mount Lindesay Highway; Beaudesert Nerang Road; Beaudesert Beenleigh Road	Marburg	Rosewood, Boonah, Rarhdowney, Beaudesert	Tamborine		Ends at an intersection with Tourist Drive 8. Left to Tamborine village, right to Canungra.
Tourist Drive 21 The Falls Drive	Acacia Street; Border Road; Spring Creek Road	Killarney	Browns Falls; Daggs Falls; Queen Mary Falls; Carrs Lookout; The Head; Croftby	Coochin		Joins near Coochin. Onward options: North to Boonah, south to Rathdowney.; Loop route: returning on same road; Loop route: return via Condamine River Road (may be 4WD only)
Tourist Drive 22 Kenilworth	Eumundi Kenilworth Road; Maleny Kenilworth Road; Macadamia Drive	Eumundi	Kenilworth	Maleny		
Tourist Drive 23 Blackall Range	Landsborough Maleny Road; Mountain View Road; Maleny Stanley River Road; Coral Street; Bunya Street; Landsborough Maleny Road; Maleny Montville Road; Balmoral Road; Main Street, Montville; Montville Mapleton Road; Flaxton Drive; Nambour Mapleton Road; Netherton Street; National Park Road; Bli Bli Road	Landsborough	Maleny	Nambour		
Tourist Drive 24 Glass House Mountains	Steve Irwin Way	Glenview	Landsborough	Beerwah		Also signed as. For an extension to this drive that takes in much more of the Glass House Mountains, see here
Tourist Drive 25 Tanawha-Forest Glen Tourist Drive	Tanawha Tourist Drive; Owen Creek Road	Tanawha		Forest Glen		
Tourist Drive 29 Mount Mee	Mount Mee Road; D'Aguilar Highway	Dayboro	Mount Mee	Woodford		Follows from Dayboro to D'Aguilar then follows to Woodford
Tourist Drive 32 Kerry Valley	Brisbane Street; Kerry Road; Darlington Connection Road; Widgee Creek Road	Beaudesert	Kerry	Hillview		
Tourist Drive 32 Somerset Tourist Drive	Esk Kilcoy Rd	Esk	Somerset Dam	Woolmar		A Single Sign Can be found on Wivenhoe-Somerset Rd
Tourist Drive 40 Gympie City	Brisbane Road; Red Hill Road; Apollonian Vale; Caledonian Hill; Calton Hill; Young Street; River Road; Monkland Street; Mary Street; Duke Street; Corella Road; Fraser Road	Gympie				Goes through Central Gympie
Tourist Drive 41 Opportunity Drive	Gatton Clifton Road; Felton Clifton Road; Sister Kenny Street; Nobby Connection Road	Nobby	Clifton	Spring Creek		Runs Parallel with through most of the Route
Tourist Drive 42 Mary Valley	Kenilworth–Skyring Creek Road; Tuchekoi Road; Mary Valley Road; Yabba Creek Road; Kandanga–Imbil Road	Gympie	Imbil	Tuchekoi	49 km (30.4 mi)	
Tourist Drive 43 Cooloola-Fraser Island	Tin Can Bay Road; Rainbow Beach Road; Clarkson Drive; Inskip Avenue; Inskip Point Road	Tin Can Bay	Rainbow Beach	Fraser Island		Ferry Crosses to Fraser Island

== See also ==
- List of road routes in Queensland
