= Pacific Coast Way =

Road route in Australia

The Pacific Coast Way is an Australian road route from Sydney, New South Wales to Cairns in Queensland. It has been designated by the Queensland Government as a State Strategic Touring Route.

== The route ==
The route in New South Wales is generally via the Pacific Motorway / Pacific Highway to the Gold Coast at the Queensland border. The route in Queensland follows the Pacific Motorway to Brisbane and then the Bruce Highway to Cairns.

== Tourism Queensland website ==
The organisation "Tourism and Events Queensland" has established a website titled "Pacific Coast Way" that shows a map of the route from the Gold Coast to Cairns, with side trips to the Sunshine Coast, Hervey Bay, Bundaberg, Gladstone, Airlie Beach and Mission Beach. It provides some information about each of the following segments:

- Gold Coast to Brisbane (intersection with Adventure Way and Warrego Way)
- Brisbane to Maroochydore
- Maroochydore to Gympie
- Gympie to Hervey Bay
- Hervey Bay to Bundaberg
- Bundaberg to Gin Gin
- Gin Gin to Gladstone
- Gladstone to Rockhampton (intersection with Australia's Country Way, Leichhardt Way and Capricorn Way)
- Rockhampton to Mackay
- Mackay to Airlie Beach
- Airlie Beach to Bowen
- Bowen to Home Hill
- Home Hill to Townsville (intersection with Overlanders Way)
- Townsville to Ingham
- Ingham to Cardwell
- Cardwell to Mission Beach
- Mission Beach to Cairns

== See also ==
- Queensland Electric Super Highway
