= Great Inland Way =

Australian road route from Sydney to Cairns

The Great Inland Way is an Australian road route from Sydney, New South Wales to Cairns in Queensland. It has been designated by the Queensland Government as a State Strategic Touring Route.

== The route ==
The New South Wales section is from Sydney to Hebel, on the Queensland side of the state border, generally following the M4 Western Motorway, the Great Western Highway and the Castlereagh Highway. The route in Queensland is via the Castlereagh Highway to St George, and then as follows:

- Carnarvon Highway from St George to Rolleston
- Dawson Highway from Rolleston to Springsure
- Gregory Highway from Springsure to Conjuboy (The Lynd Oasis Roadhouse)
- Kennedy Developmental Road / Kennedy Highway from Conjuboy to Evelyn (concurrent with Savannah Way from Minnamoolka (Forty Mile Scrub) to Cairns)
- State Routes 24, 25 and 52 from Evelyn to Gordonvale
- Bruce Highway from Gordonvale to Cairns (concurrent with Pacific Coast Way)

== Planned upgrade ==
The section from St George to Charters Towers is part of a planned upgrade to become the Queensland Inland Freight Route.

== RACQ brochure ==
The Royal Automobile Club of Queensland (RACQ) has published a brochure titled "Great Inland Way" that includes maps showing the route from Hebel to Cairns, with a diversion via Ravenshoe, Atherton and Mareeba, and an extension from Cairns to Cooktown. It breaks the route into the following segments and lists things to see and do in or near each segment:

- Hebel to St George (intersections with Balonne Highway and Moonie Highway (Adventure Way))
- St George to Roma (intersection with Warrego Highway (Warrego Way))
- Roma to Injune
- Injune to Emerald (intersection with Capricorn Highway (Capricorn Way))
- Emerald to Clermont
- Clermont to Charters Towers (intersection with Flinders Highway (Overlanders Way))
- Charters Towers to Ravenshoe
- Ravenshoe to Atherton
- Atherton to Mareeba
- Mareeba to Cairns
- Cairns to Cooktown
