= Matilda Way =

Tourist road route in Australia

The Matilda Way is an Australian road route from Bourke, New South Wales to Karumba in Queensland. It has been designated by the Queensland Government as a State Strategic Touring Route.

== The route ==
The New South Wales section is from Bourke to Barringun, on the Queensland side of the state border, via the Mitchell Highway. The route in Queensland is via the Mitchell Highway to Augathella, and then as follows:

- Landsborough Highway from Augathella to Cloncurry
- Burke Developmental Road from Cloncurry to Howitt (Walker Creek Rest Stop)
- Karumba Road from Howitt to Karumba

== Outback Queensland website ==
The tourism organisation "Outback Queensland" has established a website titled "Matilda Way" that provides some information about each of the following segments:

- Barringun to Cunnamulla (intersection with Balonne Highway (Adventure Way))
- Cunnamulla to Charleville (intersections with Warrego Highway and Diamantina Developmental Road (Warrego Way))
- Charleville to Blackall
- Blackall to Barcaldine (intersection with Capricorn Highway (Capricorn Way))
- Barcaldine to Longreach
- Longreach to Winton
- Winton to Kynuna
- Kynuna to McKinlay to Cloncurry (intersections with Flinders Highway and Barkly Highway (Overlanders Way))
- Cloncurry to Normanton (intersections with Gulf Developmental Road and Burketown Normanton Road (Savannah Way))
- Normanton to Karumba
