= Leichhardt Way =

The Leichhardt Way is an Australian road route from Melbourne, Victoria to Rockhampton in Queensland. It has been designated by the Queensland Government as a State Strategic Touring Route.

== The route ==
The Victorian section is from Melbourne to Tocumwal, on the New South Wales side of the state border, generally following the Hume Freeway and the Goulburn Valley Freeway / Highway. The New South Wales section follows the Newell Highway to Goondiwindi, on the Queensland side of the state border. The bulk of the route in Queensland is via the Leichhardt Highway from:

- Goondiwindi to Miles (intersection with Warrego Highway (Warrego Way))
- Miles to Banana (intersection with Dawson Highway)
- Banana to Dululu (intersection with Burnett Highway (Australia’s Country Way))
- Dululu to Westwood (intersection with Capricorn Highway (Capricorn Way))

From Westwood the route follows the Capricorn Highway and Bruce Highway into Rockhampton.

== RACQ brochure ==
The Royal Automobile Club of Queensland (RACQ) has published a brochure titled "Leichhardt Highway" that includes a map showing the route from Melbourne to Rockhampton, with an extension from Rockhampton to Yeppoon and a side trip from Dululu to Mount Morgan. It lists things to see and do in or near each of the following Queensland localities:

- Goondiwindi
- Tara
- Miles
- Taroom
- Theodore
- Banana
- Mount Morgan
- Rockhampton
- Yeppoon
