= Queensland Inland Freight Route =

Freight route

Queensland Inland Freight Route Queensland

General information
- Type: Highway (Proposed)
- Length: 1,181 km (734 mi)
- Route number(s): Gregory Highway (Charters Towers - Springsure); Dawson Highway (Springsure - Rolleston); Carnarvon Highway (Rolleston - Roma); Carnarvon Highway (Roma - St George); Carnarvon Highway (St George - Mungindi)

Major junctions
- North end: Flinders Highway Broughton
- Bowen Developmental Road; Peak Downs Highway; Capricorn Highway; Warrego Highway; Moonie Highway; Barwon Highway
- South end: Queensland / NSW border Mungindi

Location(s)
- Major settlements: Emerald, Springsure, Rolleston, Roma, St George

Highway system
- Highways in Australia; National Highway • Freeways in Australia; Highways in Queensland

Queensland Inland Freight Route is a proposal to upgrade the existing highways from Charters Towers to Mungindi in Queensland, Australia. It would be a quality two-lane alternative freight route to the Bruce Highway.

== Funding and program status ==
The estimated total cost in 2020 was $1.0 billion. The project was announced in October 2020 with an initial funding of $400 million from the Federal Government and $200 million from the Queensland Government. In the 2021 Budget the Queensland Government indicated that half of its funding had been allocated to a future priorities funding commitment. The project is at the detailed planning stage. Infrastructure Australia has set the project status as long-term (10 to 20 years).

== Type of work ==
Works to be undertaken would include pavement straightening, road widening, new alignments, overtaking lanes and new or upgraded bridges.

== Proposed route ==
The route would follow the Gregory Highway from Charters Towers to Springsure, the Dawson Highway to Rolleston, and the Carnarvon Highway to Mungindi, a distance of almost 1,200 kilometres (750 mi). The section from Charters Towers to St George is part of the Great Inland Way, a State Strategic Touring Route.
