= State Strategic Touring Routes in Queensland =

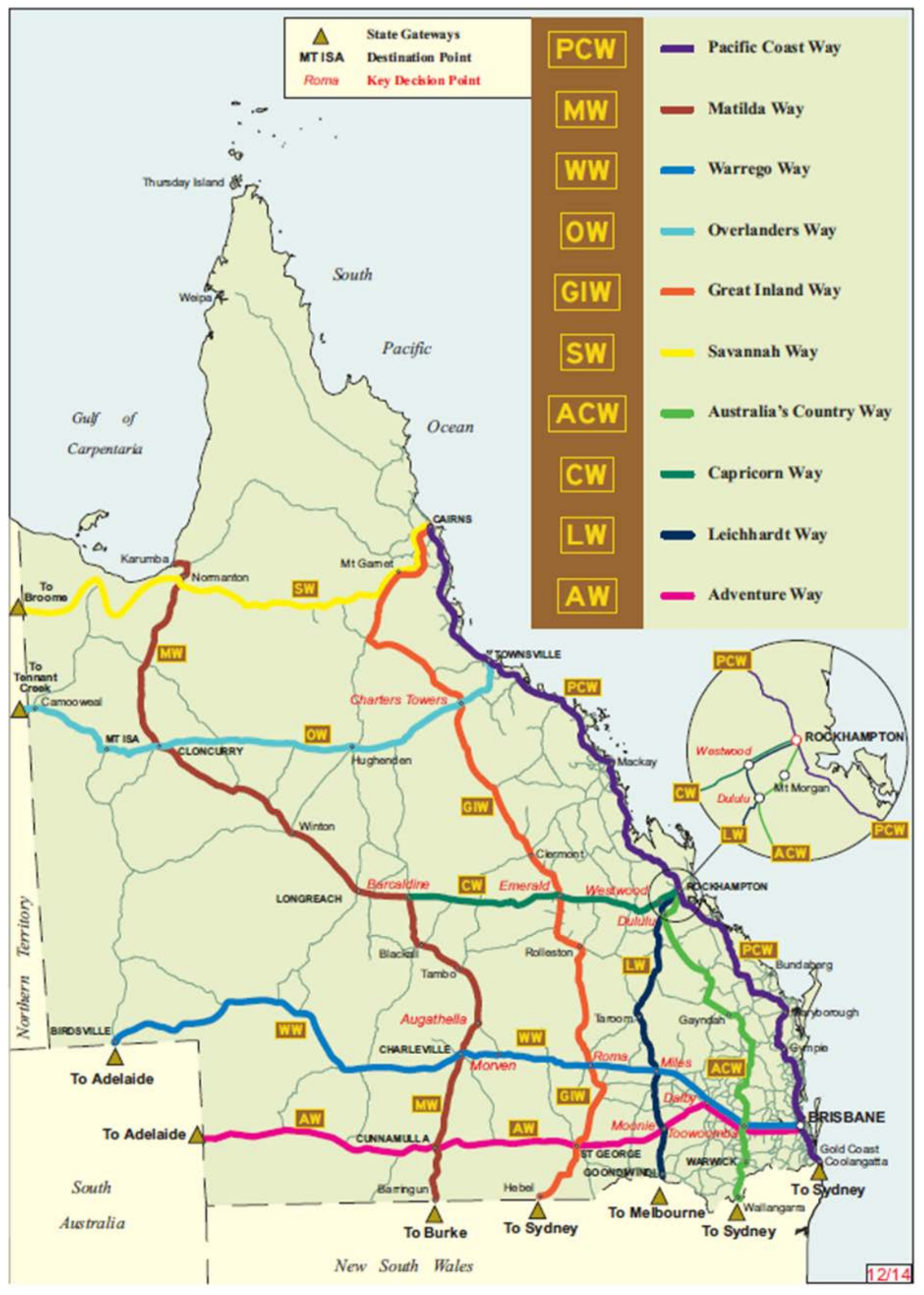
State Strategic Touring Routes

State Strategic Touring Routes (SSTR) are road routes in Queensland, Australia, which have been identified as significant to motoring tourists. These are the primary routes used by tourists as they provide the connections between popular tourist locations, and consequently have high volumes of tourist traffic. Standardised road signage is used to identify the route itself, with "Welcome to" signage at towns and districts of interest to tourists, as well as "turn off" signage to natural attractions.

SSTRs must meet criteria as to road quality and safety to be included. Roads used in SSTRs may be closed in some seasons, provided this information is made available to SSTRs users. Information for tourists travelling the route must be available either through Visitor/Tourist Information Centres or by signage at rest stops and points of interests.

The identification of a route as an SSTR does not affect the naming and gazettal of the roads that make up the route.

== Routes ==
The following routes have been identified as SSTRs:

- Adventure Way: Brisbane to Innamincka (SA) and then to Adelaide (SA)
- Australia’s Country Way: Rockhampton to Wallangarra and then to Sydney (NSW)
- Capricorn Way: Rockhampton to Barcaldine
- Great Inland Way: Cairns to Hebel and then to Sydney (NSW)
- Leichhardt Way: Rockhampton to Goondiwindi and then to Melbourne (VIC)
- Matilda Way: Karumba to Barringun and then to Bourke (NSW)
- Overlanders Way: Townsville to Camooweal and then to Tennant Creek (NT)
- Pacific Coast Way: Cairns to Coolangatta and then to Sydney (NSW)
- Savannah Way: Cairns to Hells Gate Roadhouse and then to Broome (WA)
- Warrego Way: Brisbane to Charleville and Birdsville
