= Overlanders Way =

The Overlanders Way is an Australian road route from Townsville in Queensland to Tennant Creek, Northern Territory. It has been designated by the Queensland Government as a State Strategic Touring Route.

== The route ==
The route is via the Flinders Highway to Cloncurry, and then the Barkly Highway to Tennant Creek.

== Outback Queensland website ==
The tourism organisation "Outback Queensland" has established a website titled "Overlanders Way" that provides some information about each of the following segments:

- Townsville to Charters Towers (intersection with Gregory Highway (Great Inland Way))
- Charters Towers to Hughenden
- Hughenden to Richmond
- Richmond to Julia Creek
- Julia Creek to Cloncurry (intersections with Landsborough Highway and Burke Developmental Road (Matilda Way))
- Cloncurry to Mount Isa
- Mount Isa to Camooweal
