= Australia's Country Way =

Road route in Australia

Australia's Country Way is an Australian road route from Rockhampton to Wallangarra in Queensland and then to Sydney, New South Wales. Using Australia's Country Way, it is 1615 km from Rockhampton to Sydney, requiring approx 20 hours of driving. It has been designated by the Queensland Government as a State Strategic Touring Route.

== The route ==
The route is:

- Rockhampton via the Burnett Highway to Monto
- Monto via the Burnett Highway to Wondai and then via the Bunya Highway to Kingaroy
- Kingaroy via the D'Aguilar Highway to Yarraman and then via the New England Highway to Toowoomba
- Toowoomba via the New England Highway to Warwick
- Warwick via the New England Highway to Wallangarra and then to Tenterfield, New South Wales
- Tenterfield via the New England Highway to Armidale
- Armidale via the New England Highway to Tamworth
- Tamworth via the New England Highway to Newcastle and then via the M1 Pacific Motorway to Sydney
