= Warrego Way =

The Warrego Way is an Australian road route from Brisbane to Birdsville in Queensland. Using the Warrego Way, it is 1578 km from Brisbane to Birdsville. The recommended journey time, allowing for some sightseeing, food and rest (including overnight stops) is 48 hours. It has been designated by the Queensland Government as a State Strategic Touring Route.

== The route ==
The route is from:

- Brisbane via the Warrego Highway to Charleville
- Charleville via the Diamantina Developmental Road and Birdsville Developmental Road to Birdsville
