= Capricorn Way =

Road route in Queensland, Australia

The Capricorn Way is an Australian road route from Rockhampton to Barcaldine in Queensland. Using the Capricorn Way, it is 579.67 km (360.19 mi) from Rockhampton to Barcaldine. The recommended journey time, allowing for some sightseeing, food and rest (including an overnight stop) is 30 hours. It has been designated by the Queensland Government as a State Strategic Touring Route.

== The route ==
The entire route is via the Capricorn Highway from:

- Rockhampton to Duaringa
- Duaringa to Blackwater
- Blackwater to Emerald
- Emerald to The Gemfields
- The Gemfields to Alpha
- Alpha to Barcaldine
