= Adventure Way =

Australian outback route

The Adventure Way is an Australian outback route between Brisbane, Queensland, and Innamincka, South Australia (and, in some publications, extending through to Adelaide via the Strzelecki Track). Using the Adventure Way, it is 1,152 kilometres (716 mi) from Brisbane to Innamincka. The recommended journey time, allowing for some sightseeing, food and rest (including overnight stops) is 96 hours. It has been designated by the Queensland Government as a State Strategic Touring Route.

== The route ==
The route commences in Brisbane, via the Ipswich Motorway and then via the Warrego Highway to Toowoomba and Dalby. From Dalby, it follows the Moonie Highway to St George. From there it follows the Balonne Highway to Cunnamulla. From Cunnamulla, the route follows the Bulloo Developmental Road to Thargomindah. From Thargomindah, it follows the Buloo Developmental Road (Bundeena Road) to the turnoff (27.63350°S 142.6838°E) to the Innamincka Road through to Innamincka.

The route is a sealed road through Queensland but unsealed in South Australia.
