= Road transport in Australia =

Component of transport in Australia

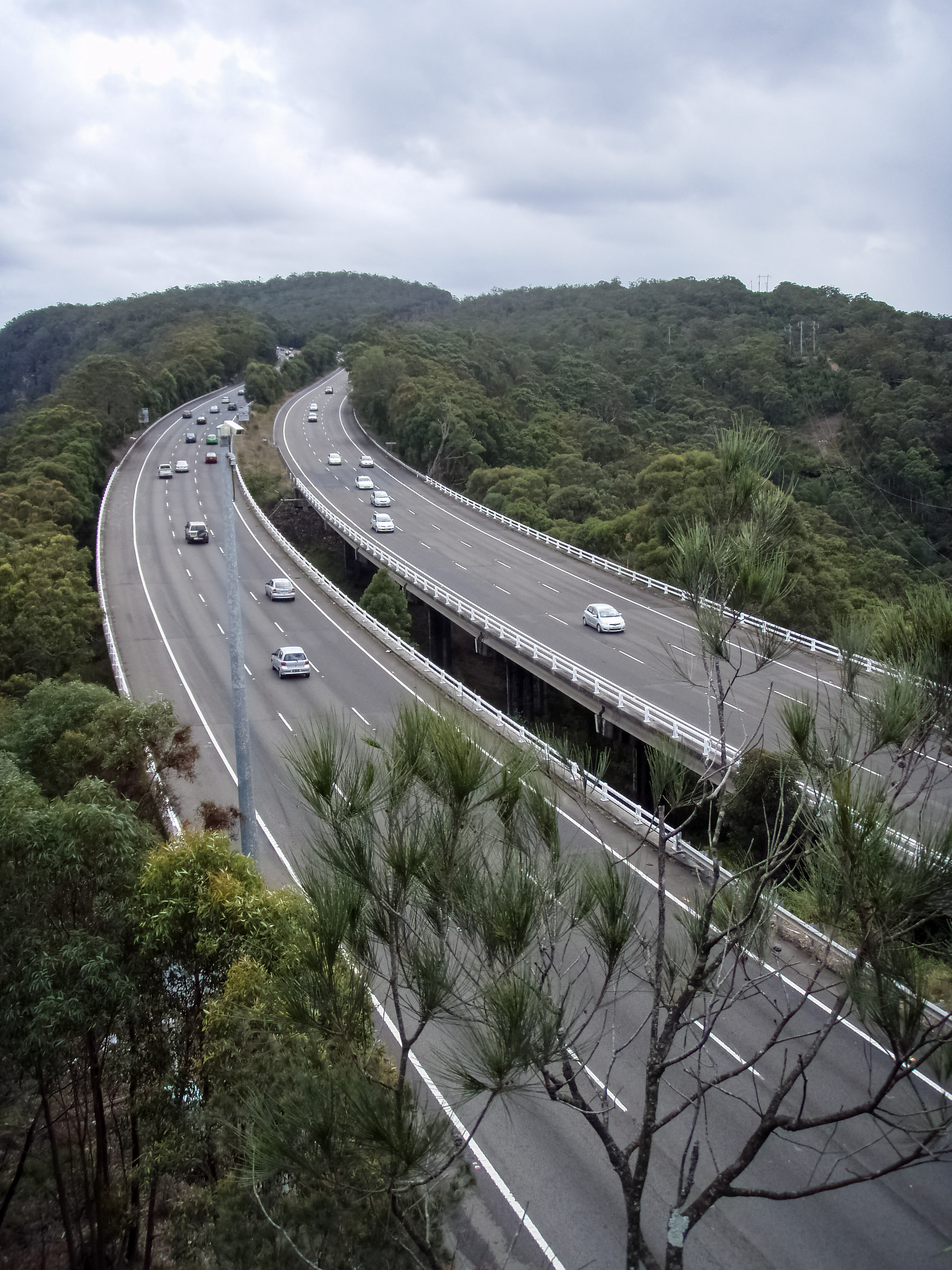
The M1 Pacific Motorway is the major road transport link between the cities of Sydney and Brisbane. The section between Sydney and Newcastle is one of the busiest roads in Australia, with an average of 70,000 vehicles per day.

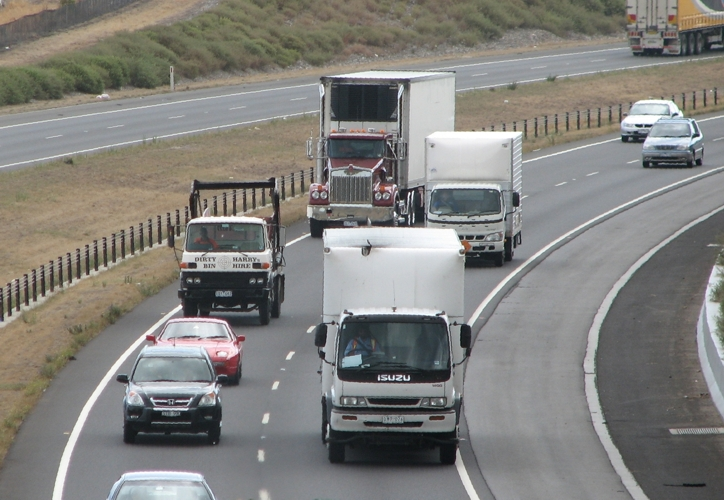
The Hume Highway is the major road transport link between the cities of Melbourne and Sydney.

Road transport is an element of the Australian transport network, and contributes to the Australian economy. Australia relies heavily on road transport due to Australia's large area and low population density in considerable parts of the country.

Another reason for the reliance upon roads is that the Australian rail network has not been sufficiently developed for a lot of the freight and passenger requirements in most areas of Australia. This has meant that goods that would otherwise be transported by rail are moved across Australia via road trains. Almost every household owns at least one car, and uses it most days.

Victoria is the state with the highest density of arterial roads in Australia.

The total annual cost of the vehicle economy is A$316.12 billion. Less than half of this figure (including externalities) is paid for by motor vehicle users, which challenges "the belief that drivers fully bear automobility costs".

== Costs and funding ==
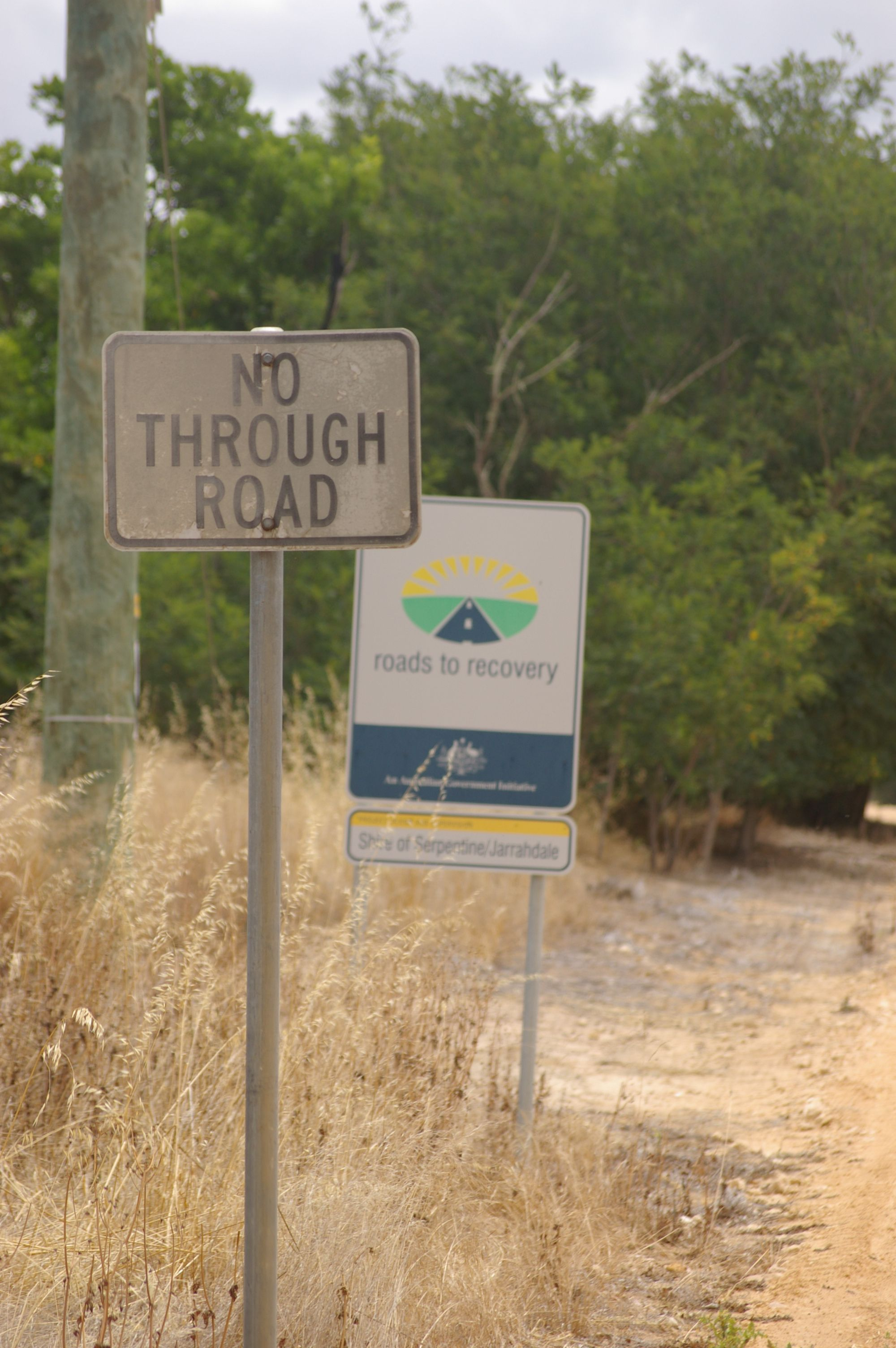
Signage that shows funding for repairs/upgrades was used through the Federal Government's "Roads to Recovery" program.

Funding and responsibility for Australia's road network is split between the three levels of government; Federal, State and Local. Because of long distances, low population densities, and widely separated major settlements, the costs of and funding for roads in Australia has been, historically, a major fiscal issue for all levels of government, especially Federal and State. The popular phrase 'the tyranny of distance', also the title of a famous historical work, captures the central role of transport in Australian policy, producing many conflicts. It was not until the Bland enquiry in Victoria that there was an attempt to outline the complex questions in economic theory and practice of determining and measuring road costs and their allocation. In 1978-80 the McDonell Enquiry reviewed road and rail freight transport in New South Wales and its affected cities and regions, (the 'hub' of the Australian freight transport system). It was set up because of the 'truckies' blockades and national disturbances which disrupted access to all mainland capitals. These were largely sparked by the levels of road taxes. This enquiry developed the first comprehensive theoretical and measurement system for assessing and allocating road costs. This system was subsequently applied more widely, and then extended, with later studies, for the establishment of current national policy and principles. Fuel tax is around 50 cents per litre. Fuel sales in Australia (per year) are around 16 billion litres of gasoline, and 32 billion litres of diesel.

The Federal government provides funds under the AusLink programme for several funding programs including:

- National Projects
- National Network Maintenance, essentially the National Highway, comprising the main freeways and highways linking the major cities of Australia
- Roads to Recovery Program - provides funding allocations to councils in each State or Territory
- Black Spot Program (improvements to high accident risk spots)
- Strategic Regional Program
- Innovation and Research
- Funding for Local Roads

Other highways and main roads linking regional centres are funded by the respective state governments. Local and minor roads are generally funded by the third tier of government, local councils.

The Business Council of Australia in its Infrastructure Action Plan, estimated that in 2004, road infrastructure was under funded by A$10 billion.

== Roads and highways ==
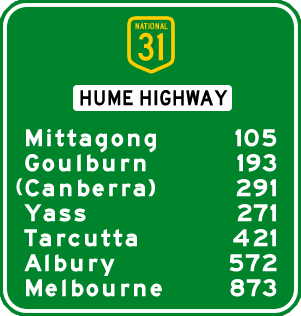
Sign showing distances (in kilometres) on the Hume Highway from Sydney to Melbourne

Total employment in the road transport industry in Australia (thousands of people) since 1984

Different standards of roads are generally called by various names. With wide variations in population across the nation, the name of a road does not always reflect the construction or capacity of a particular road.

=== Freeways, motorways, expressways and tollways ===
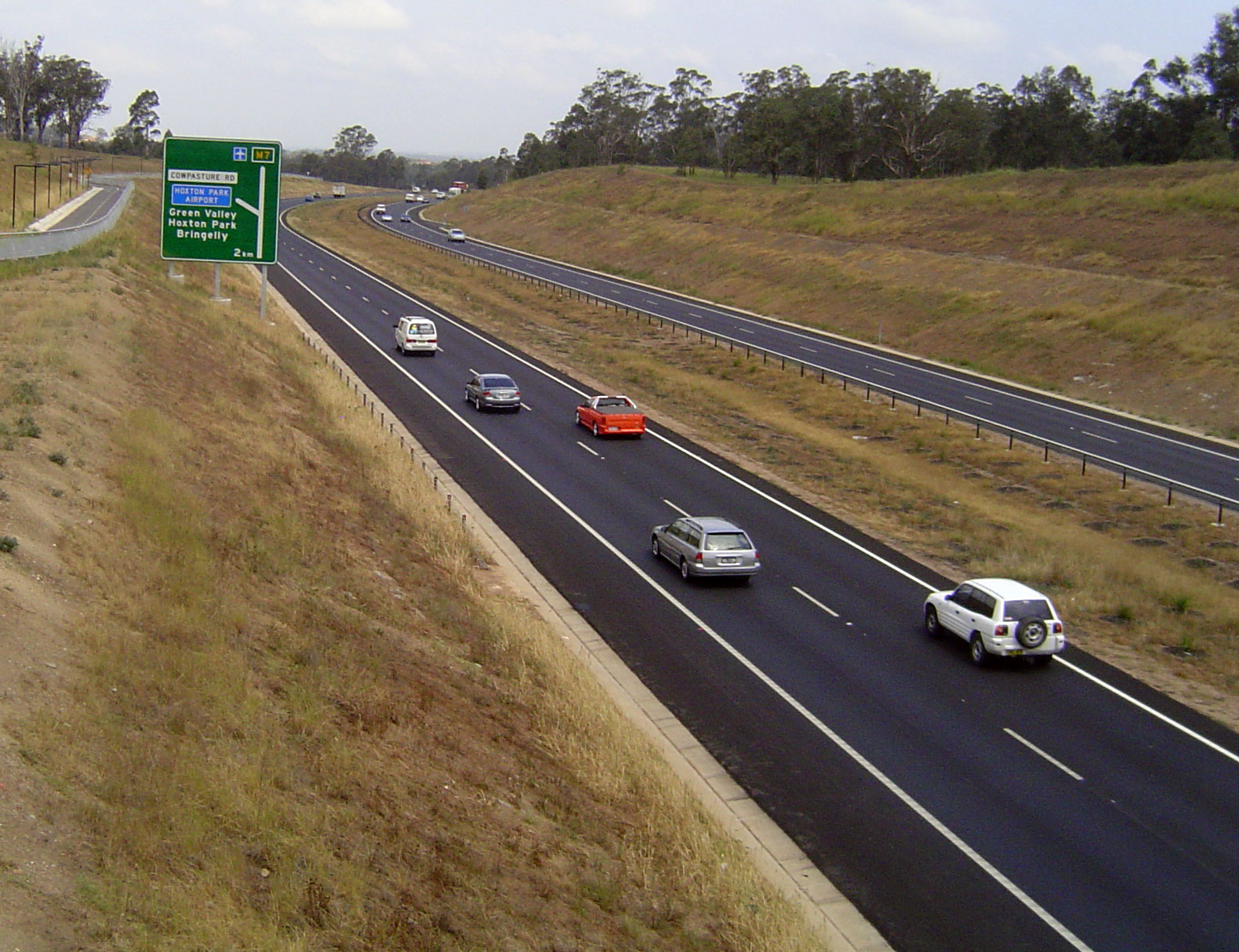
Westlink M7, Western Sydney

Freeways are major roads with more than one lane of traffic in each direction designed for higher speed operation. They have barriers or wide median strips separating traffic travelling in opposite directions, and grade-separated intersections without roundabouts or traffic lights in the main route. Some toll roads are called motorways or tollways to avoid perceived difficulties with charging people to use a freeway. Most Australian capital cities have one or more freeways across, past, or leading to them.

When limited-access highways began to be built in Sydney in the 1950s, beginning with the Cahill Expressway, they were provisionally named expressways (Note: The Department of Main Roads adopted "expressway" to describe "important dual carriageway roads with full access control and grade separations at all crossings", equivalent to "freeway" commonly used in the United States.), but in the 1960s Australian transport ministers agreed that they be called freeways (like in the United States and other countries). The Cahill Expressway has kept its original name. Melbourne's South Eastern Freeway (now called the 'Monash Freeway') was the second freeway to be opened in Australia, in 1962. However, it was originally only a short road.

Victoria has the most extensive major arterial (freeway) network in the country, including tollways.

=== Highways ===
There is an Australian national highway network linking the capital cities of each state and other major cities and towns. The national highway network is partly financed by the Australian Federal Government, but the bulk of funding comes from the individual states.

Each Australian state government maintains its own network of roads connecting most of the towns in the state. Highways and major roads include Metroads, National Routes, State Routes and routes numbered according to the Alphanumeric Route Numbering System.

Some highways in remote areas of Australia are not sealed for high traffic volumes and are not suitable for the whole range of weather conditions. Following heavy rains they may be closed to traffic.

=== Minor roads ===
Yellow and black warning signs for kangaroos are common in Australia.

Local governments maintain the vast majority of minor roads in rural areas and streets in towns and suburbs.

==== Urban ====
Urban minor roads in Australia are generally sealed, have a 50 km/h speed limit and most are illuminated at night by street lighting.

==== Rural ====
Many rural roads are not sealed but are built with a gravel base or simply graded clear and maintained from the available earth.

==== Outback ====
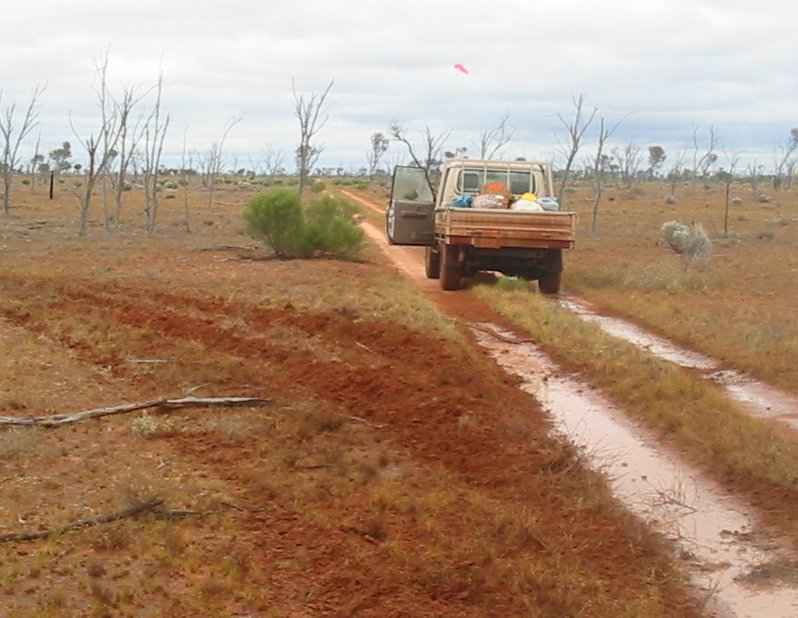
Connie Sue Highway on the Nullarbor Plain after heavy rain

Driving on minor outback roads off a sealed road can be dangerous, and motorists are generally advised to take precautions such as:

- seeking local advice
- ensuring that someone is aware of your travel plans
- remaining with vehicle in case of a breakdown
- awareness of animals such as kangaroos, especially at night
- travelling with an adequate supply of drinking water

Failure to observe these precautions can result in death. Much of Australians outback is in the mostly unpopulated area in the centre of the Australian mainland. Much of the outback roads are unmaintained or unpaved dirt roads. With potentially high heat in the summer, muddy ground after rainfall, and distance from services, it is often advised not to travel these rugged routes without caution.

=== Ferries ===
The Spirit of Tasmania is a service operated by TT-Line with two ocean-going ferries providing a "road" link between Tasmania and the mainland. There is also a Searoad ferry service across the opening of Port Phillip connecting Sorrento and Queenscliff. Kangaroo Island is connected to Cape Jervis by the SeaLink service.

Many of the road crossings over the lower Murray River are provided by government-operated cable ferries.

== Road rules and regulation ==
=== Economic regulation ===
Although trucks had played important local carriage tasks since their introduction to Australia, it was not until the 1970s that improved highways and larger trucks allowed the rapid development of long haul operations and intense competition with rail transport. This situation led to the industry disturbances (see section Costs and funding above) on the causes of which the Commission of Enquiry into the NSW freight industry reported. The Enquiry made a series of recommendations for reform involving economic principles, legal provisions, financing, economic regulation and safe operating conditions but found that effective action could not be taken at the State level. It would require re-examination of the central issue of freedom of interstate transport as embodied in Section 92 of the Constitution of Australia, and the development of appropriate national responses. With this basis, the National Freight Inquiry, completed a comprehensive survey of the national industry with major proposals. This resulted in long running development of new governance arrangements and policy for economic regulation of both road and rail freight transport. As a result, following the cooperative Federalism initiative of the 1990s, these matters are the responsibility of the National Transport Commission, within the general oversight of the Australian Transport Council of Ministers.

=== Operating regulation ===
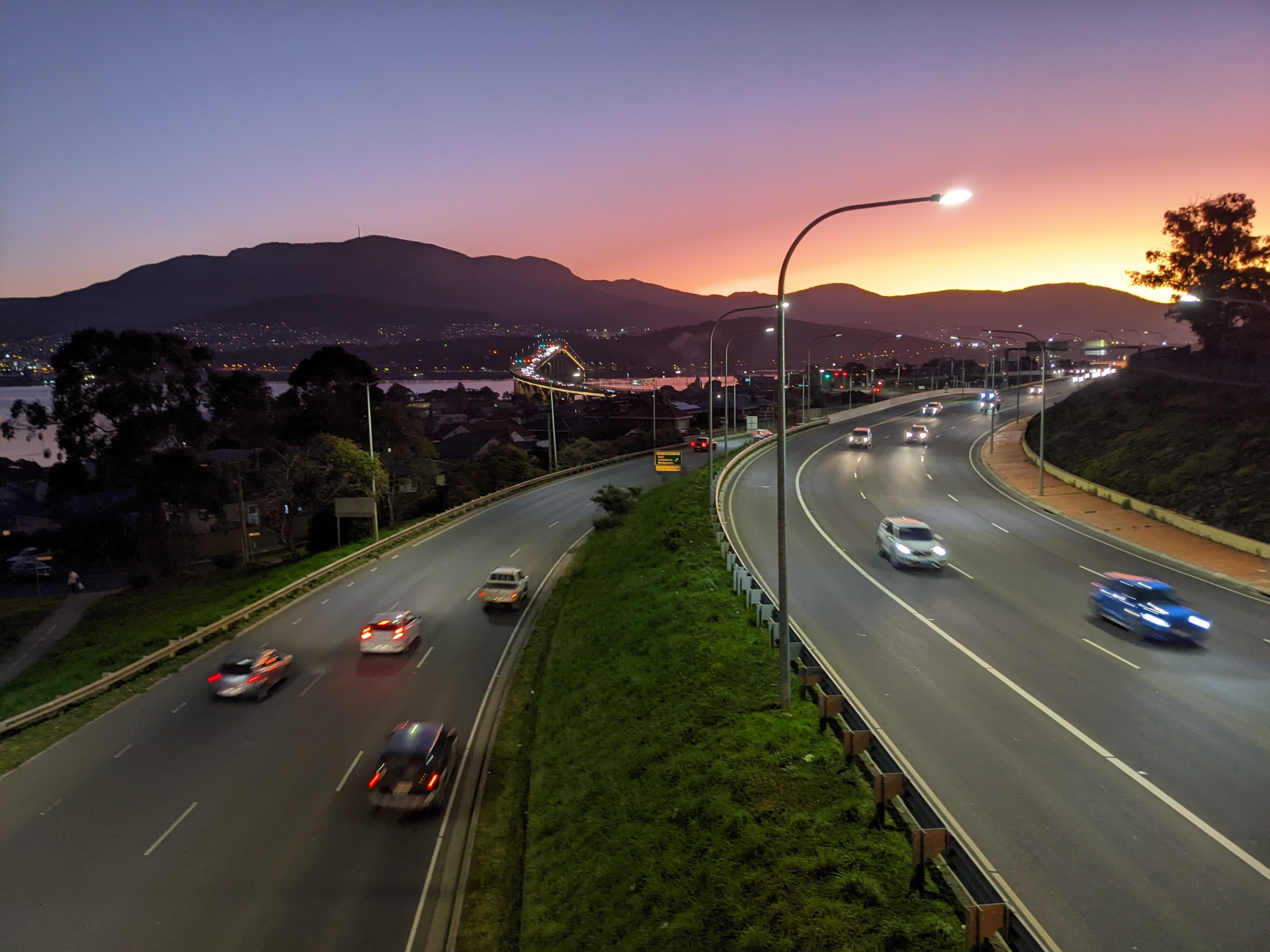
Tasman Highway in Hobart, Tasmania

Vehicles in Australia are right-hand drive, and vehicles travel on the left side of the road. The laws for all levels of government, have been mostly harmonised so that drivers do not need to learn different rules as they cross state borders. The usual speed limits are 100 km/h outside of urban areas (110 km/h on some roads where signposted). Major routes in built up areas are 80 km/h and 60 km/h, with streets generally limited to 50 km/h, often not separately signposted. Until the end of 2006, major highways in the Northern Territory had no speed limit, but now the maximum speed there is 130 km/h where signposted on the Stuart, Barkly, Victoria and Arnhem Highways, with a default of 110 km/h on all other rural roads where not otherwise signposted.

Speed limits are enforced with mobile and fixed cameras as well as mobile radar guns operated by police and state road authorities such as VicRoads. Heavy transport operators must record their driving time in a log book and take regular rest periods and are limited in how long they can drive without longer sleeping time.

If two roads with two lanes each way meet at a roundabout, the roundabout is marked with two lanes as well. Traffic turning left must use the left lane, and traffic turning right must approach in and use the right lane, travelling clockwise around the island in the centre. Traffic going straight through may generally use either lane. Vehicles must indicate their intended direction when approaching the roundabout, and indicate left when passing the exit before the one they intend to leave on. Vehicles entering the roundabout must give way to vehicles already on it.

=== Licensing ===
Typically, the first stage of licensing is gaining a learners permit. The minimum age to get this in most states is 16, and it requires:

- passing a test of knowledge of the road rules
- special L plates to be displayed, typically displaying a black L on a yellow background
- reduced blood alcohol limits compared to unrestricted drivers (acceptable BAC varies by state)
- a fully licensed driver to be in the car with the learner at all times, who must also be under the legal alcohol limit (0.05 BAC in most states)
- some states will impose maximum speeds for learner drivers (for instance, New South Wales learners are limited to 90 km/h)
- There is No requirement for professional training during the Learning or Probationary licensing periods.

After a set period of time (usually between three and twelve months), and often a certain number of hours practice, the learner driver is eligible to apply for their licence. In most states, there's also an age limit (which ranges from 16 ½ to 18, depending on state). In most states, including NSW, QLD, WA, Tas and ACT, the limit is 17. This process typically involves a practical driving test and a computerised test involving a hazard perception section and possibly some multiple choice questions. The first licence is a restricted licence known as a probationary licence or provisional licence', which typically lasts for up to three years. These drivers must display special plates (design differs across states but may be a white P on a red background, or a red or green P on a white background). This has earned them the name P Platers. Some restrictions placed on these drivers include (dependent on state):

- Reduced blood alcohol limits compared to unrestricted drivers (acceptable BAC varies by state).
- Automatic transmission only if licence test taken in an automatic vehicle.
- Limits on power/performance of cars (certain states only).
- Fewer demerit points to be accrued before licence is suspended.
- Speed limitations (certain states only).

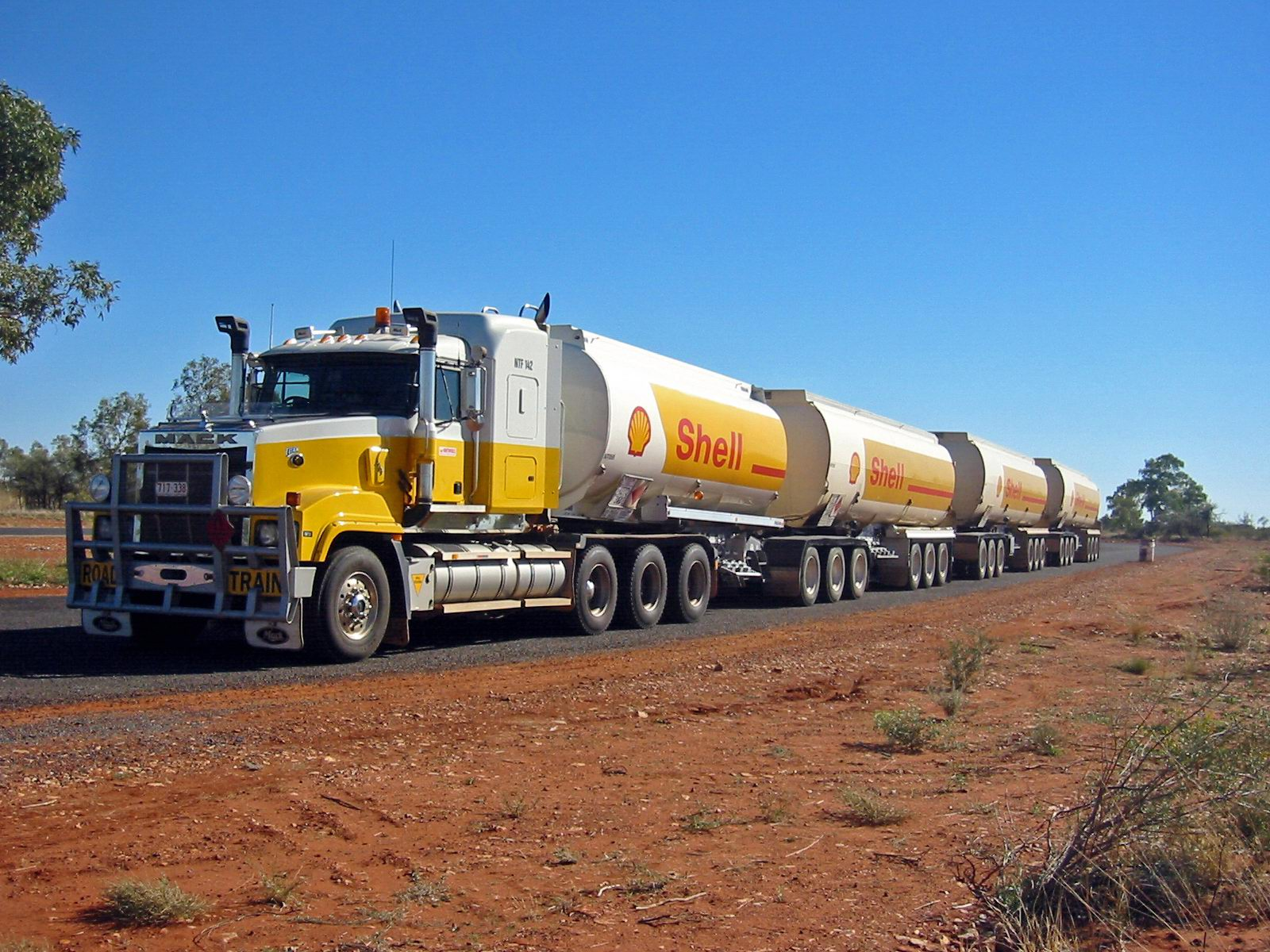
Road train of fuel tankers, Northern Territory

Some states have a two-stage probationary licensing system, where the first year of a licence has extra restrictions (and often a different coloured plate) to the later years.

Special licences exist for:

- Cars (which typically enables people to drive a car with up to 12 seats, and up to 4.5 tonnes GVM)
- Light Rigid trucks and buses
- Medium Rigid trucks and buses
- Heavy Rigid trucks
- Heavy Combination trucks
- Multi Combination trucks (B-doubles and road trains)
- Motorcycles

Heavy vehicle class licences require drivers to have experience at lighter licence classes. In some states, a car licence is acceptable for motorcycles with limited engine capacity.

== Vehicles ==
=== Cars ===
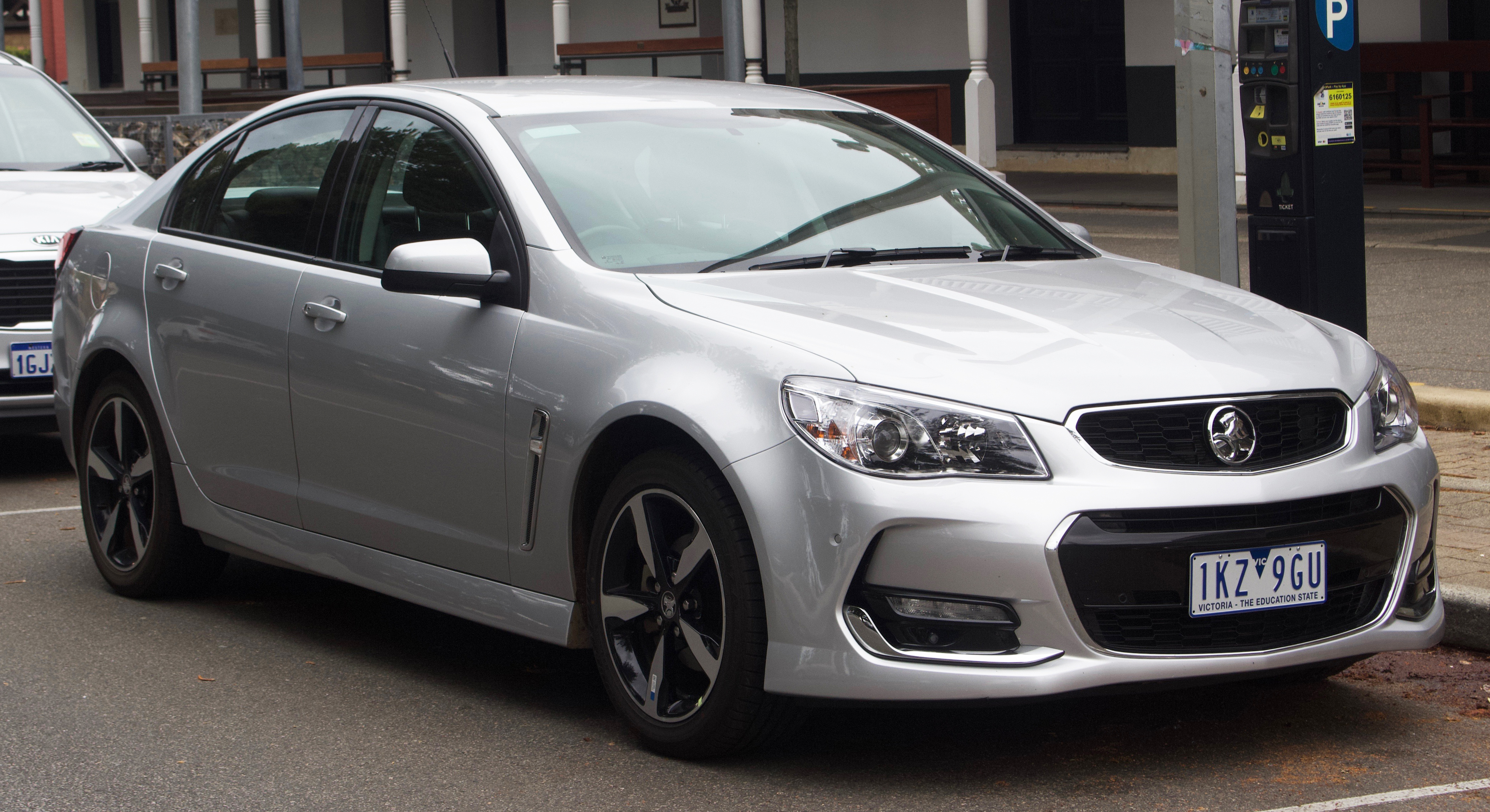
Holden Commodore VF

Five manufacturers have previously manufactured cars in Australia, all of which ceased local production in or prior to 2017. All were subsidiaries of international companies, but manufactured models designed specifically for the Australian market. They were:

- Ford: Falcon, Laser and Territory
- Holden: Commodore, Statesman/Caprice, Cruze
- Mitsubishi: Colt, Sigma, Magna/Verada, 380
- Nissan: Bluebird, Pulsar, Pintara
- Toyota: Camry, Corolla and Aurion

The distance travelled by car in Australia is amongst the highest in the world, behind the United States and Canada. In 2003, the average distance travelled per person by car was 12,730 km.

Introduction of airbags and ESC into the Australian car market:

Frontal airbags were introduced on Australian market around the 1990s. By 2006, airbag was a standard feature for around 90% of new cars. In 2014, around 80% of the national car fleet had a driver's airbag, and more than 50% a passenger airbag. It is estimated that frontal airbags reduce fatalities by 20% and side airbags by 51%.

Electronic Stability Control(ESC)began to be sold as a standard feature in Australia from 1999. ESC was mandated for all new passenger cars in 2013 and was mandated for all new light commercial vehicles by 2017. It is estimated that around 29 per cent of the light vehicle fleet was equipped with a form of ESC by 2014. It is considered that ESC reduces fatalities by 53% in some crashes.

=== Trucks ===
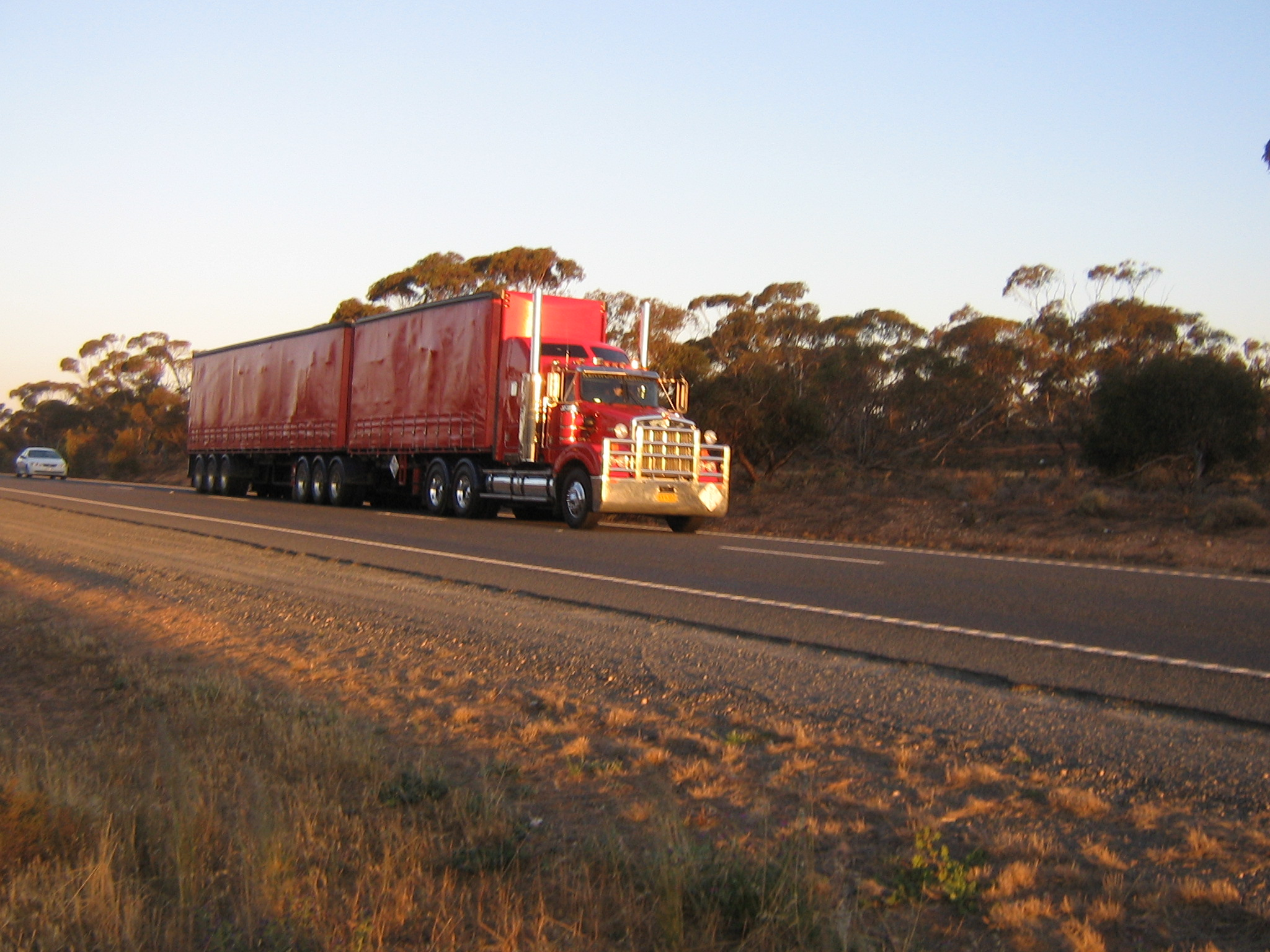
B-double truck on the Sturt Highway

Most long-haul road freight is carried on B-double semi-trailers. These trucks typically have a total of 9 axles and two articulation points . Normal semi- trailers usually have a tri-axle trailer towed by a twin-drive prime mover. In the remote areas of the north and west, three- and four-trailer road trains are used for general freight, fuel, livestock and mineral ores. Two-trailer road trains are allowed closer to populated areas, especially for bulk grain and general freight.

From July 2007, the Federal and State governments approved B-triple trucks that are allowed only to operate on a designated network of roads . A B-Triple is said to carry the load of five semi-trailers. B-Triples are set up differently from conventional road trains. The front of their first trailer is supported by the turntable on the prime mover. The second and third trailers are supported by turntables on the trailers in front of them. As a result, B-Triples are much more stable than road trains and handle exceptionally well.

The largest road transport companies are Linfox and Toll, but there are many others, including owner-drivers with only their own truck.

=== Buses ===
Main category: Bus transport in Australia

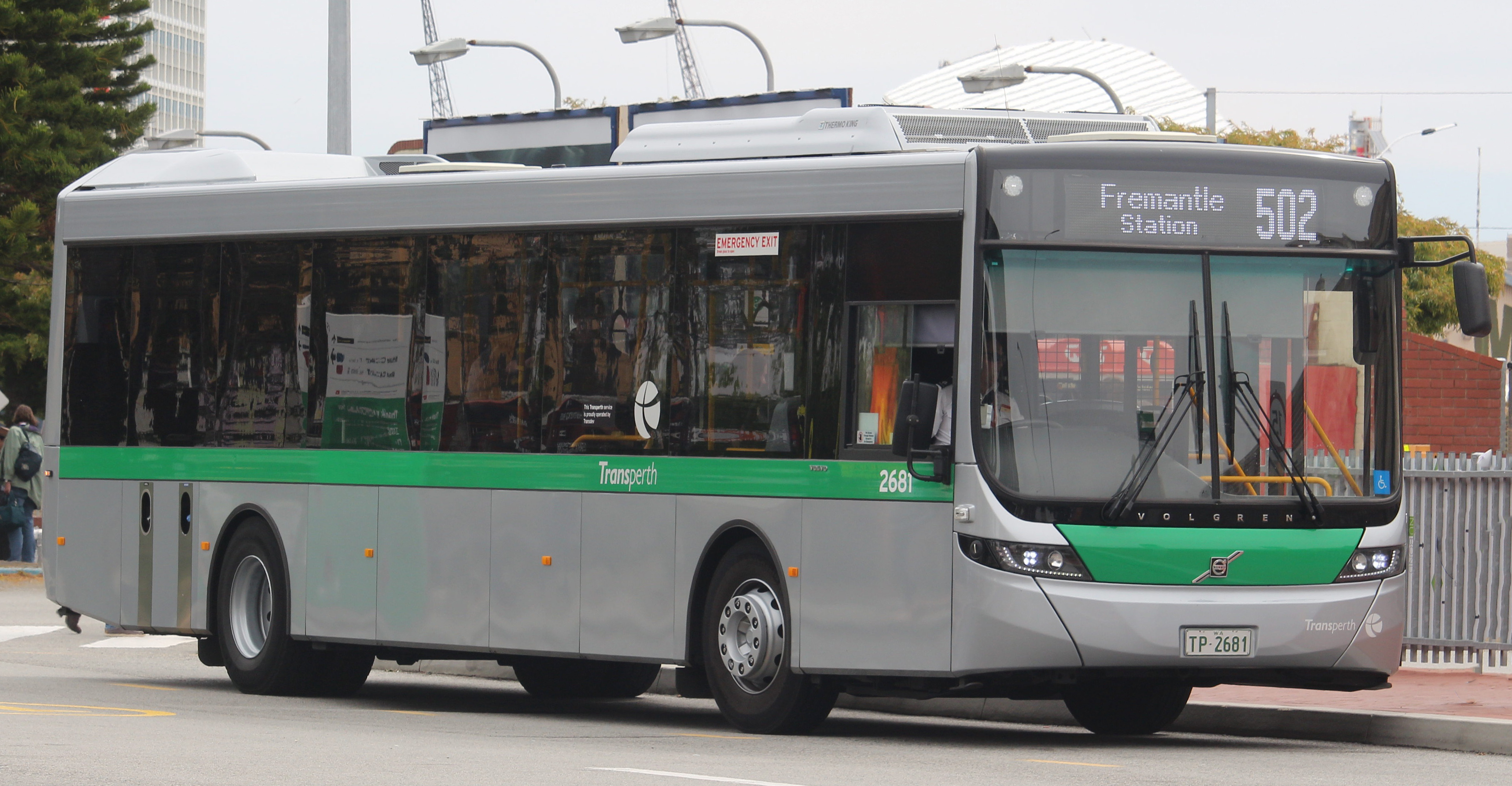
Buses provide an essential link providing public transport in Australia

Buses in Australia provide a variety of services, generally in one or more of the following categories:

- route services, following a fixed route and a published timetable, operated by government or private companies
- school services, transporting students to and from school, often under a government-subsidised scheme
- long distance services, providing intrastate and interstate travel between major towns and cities
- tourist services, operating one-day and extended tours to popular destinations
- charter services, offering buses for hire to transport like-minded people to a chosen destination
- shuttle services, providing point-to-point transport, e.g. airport to hotels
- private vehicles, maintained by companies, schools, churches or other organisations to transport their members.

Many aspects of the bus industry are heavily controlled by government. These controls may include age and condition of the bus, driver licensing and working hours, fare structure, routes and frequency of services.

=== Trams ===
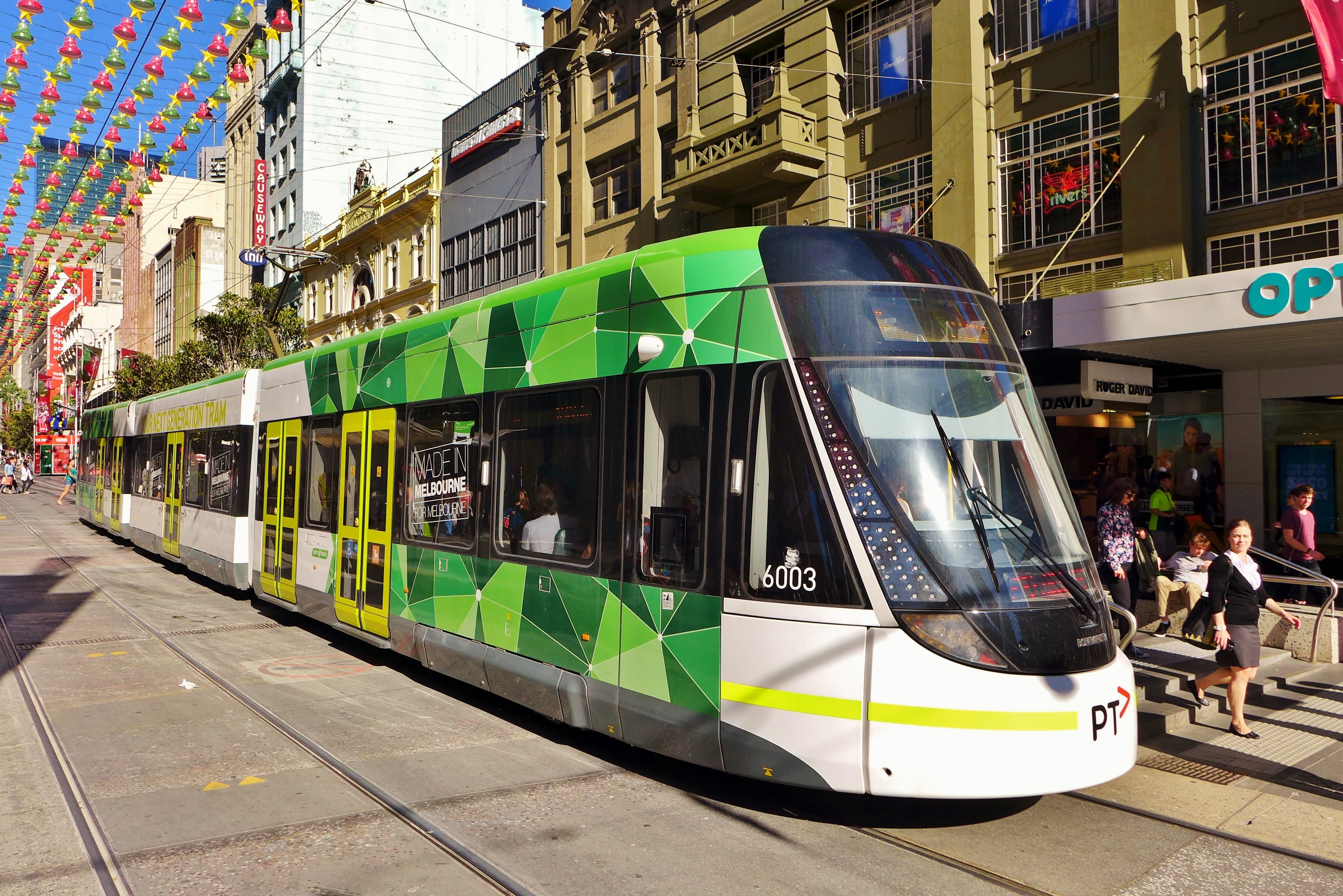
Trams in Melbourne

Trams were used in most Australian cities until the early 1960s. The Melbourne tram system is the largest in the world and remains an integral part of inner city commuting. Their cars intersect with others and large volumes of commuters have ready access to this form of transport. Tram and light rail systems are being reintroduced to some cities, such as the network in Sydney. The only remaining tram route in Adelaide is the Glenelg tram line, which was extended through the CBD in 2007 and again in 2009. At the Gold Coast a thirteen kilometre light rail system opened between Broadbeach and the Gold Coast University Hospital in 2014, and was extended seven kilometres to Helensvale railway station in 2017.

=== Motorcycles ===
Motorcycles account for around 3% of vehicles in Australia.

=== Bicycles ===
Main category: Cycling in Australia

In the late-19th and early-20th centuries - the bicycle was used extensively in the outback and countryside of Australia as an economical means of transport. In the urban areas the bicycle found wide usage where workers were living in reasonable proximity to their places of work - this can be seen in the extent of bicycle racks at Midland Railway Workshops for example.

Over a third of the population ride a bike at least once a year and over half of all households have at least one working bicycle. They are used for recreation, exercise and commuting. Most cities have developed bicycle usage strategies, while some, such as Canberra and Perth have extensively promoted bicycle usage and constructed an extensive network of cycleways that can be used by cyclists to travel large distances across the city. The recreational use of bicycles has been supported by local and state governments producing publications and websites that encourage recreational and more lately utility usage. Considerable numbers of tourists and enthusiasts use road and off-road routes that have been marked or signed for bicycle tours. Good examples are the Mawson Trail in South Australia and the Munda Biddi Trail in Western Australia.

=== Electric vehicles ===
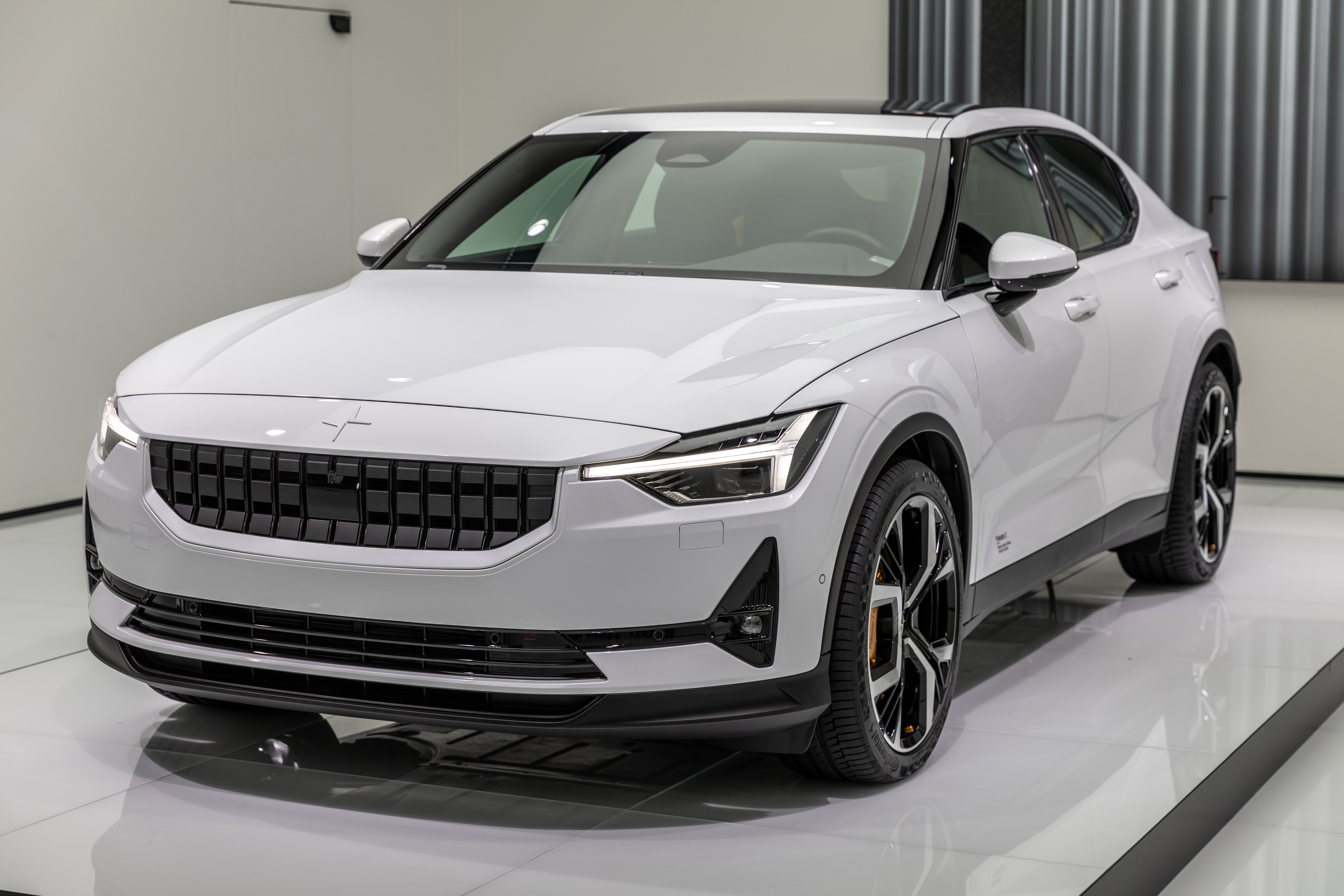
Volvo Polestar 2. with Volvo launching a new BEV each year until 2025 in Australia. Volvo also only sell plug-in electric cars in Australia as of 2021. 3,000 Australian pre-orders for delivery in 2022 and likely to be Australia's second most popular EV in 2022.

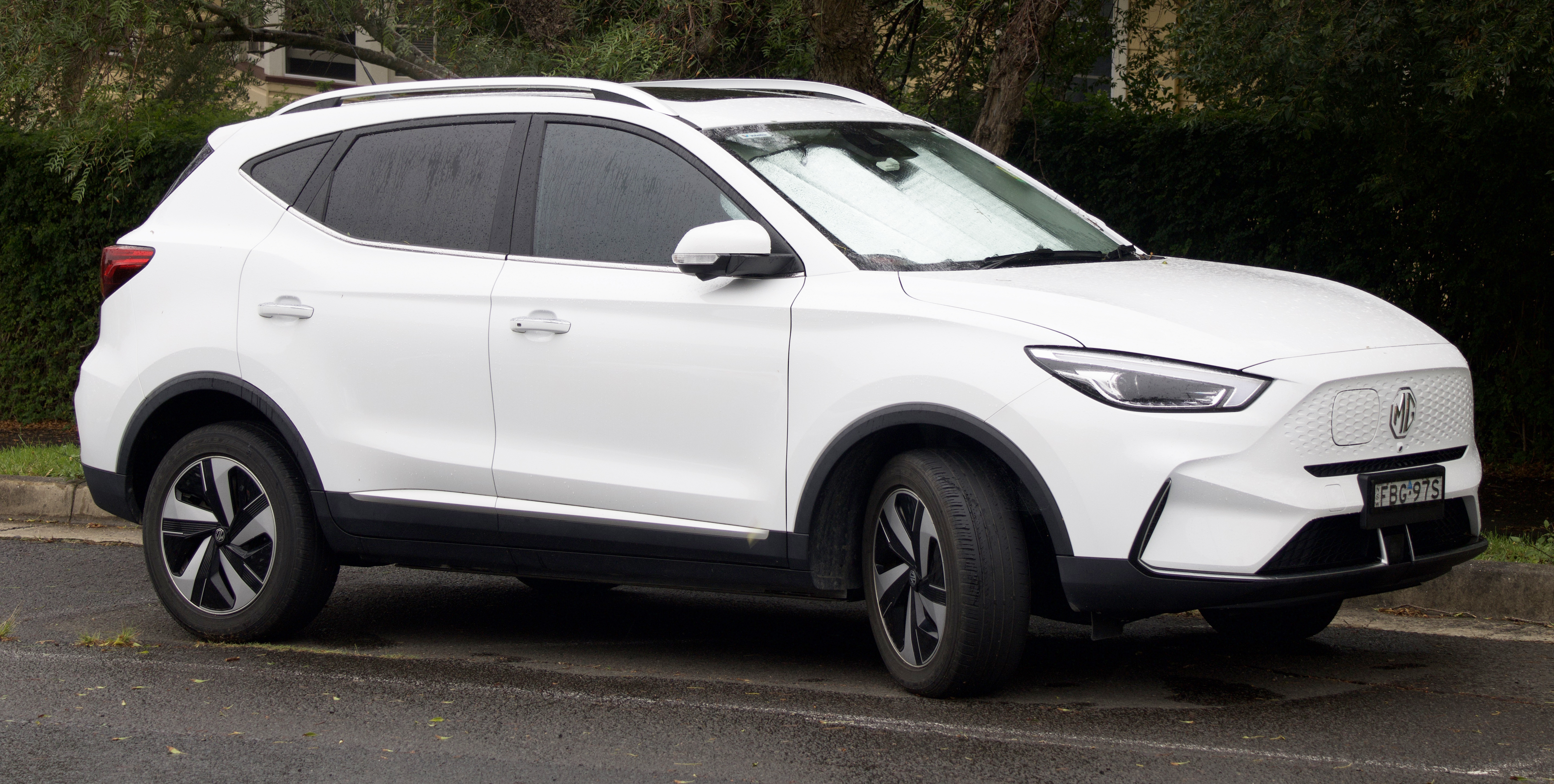
MG ZS was Australia's second most popular EV in 2021 for $44,900 (before EV subsidies)

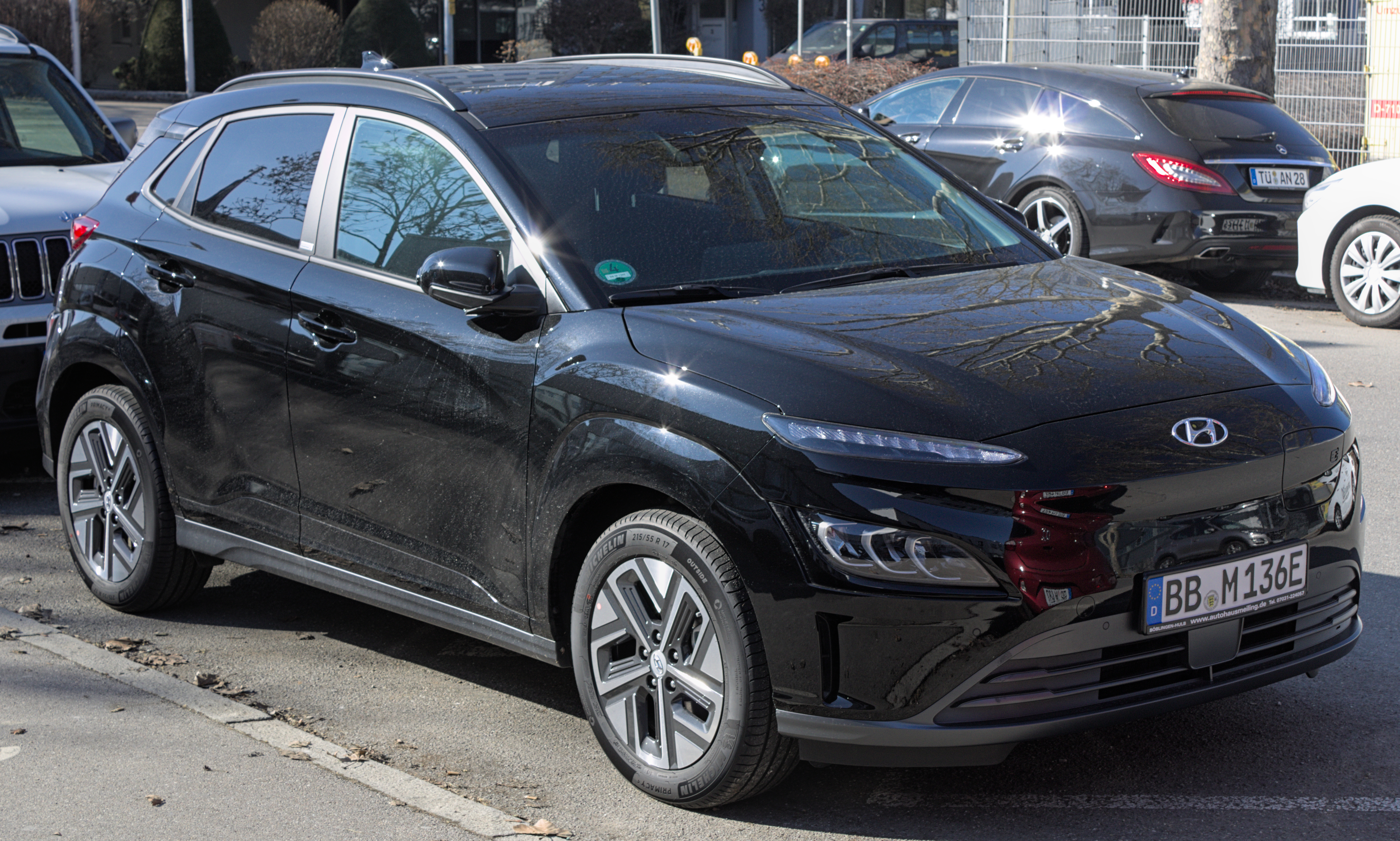
Hyundai Kona Electric was Australia's second most popular EV in 2020 for $54,000 (before EV subsidies) Hyundai also offered COVID-19 vaccinated Australians a chance to win an electric car.

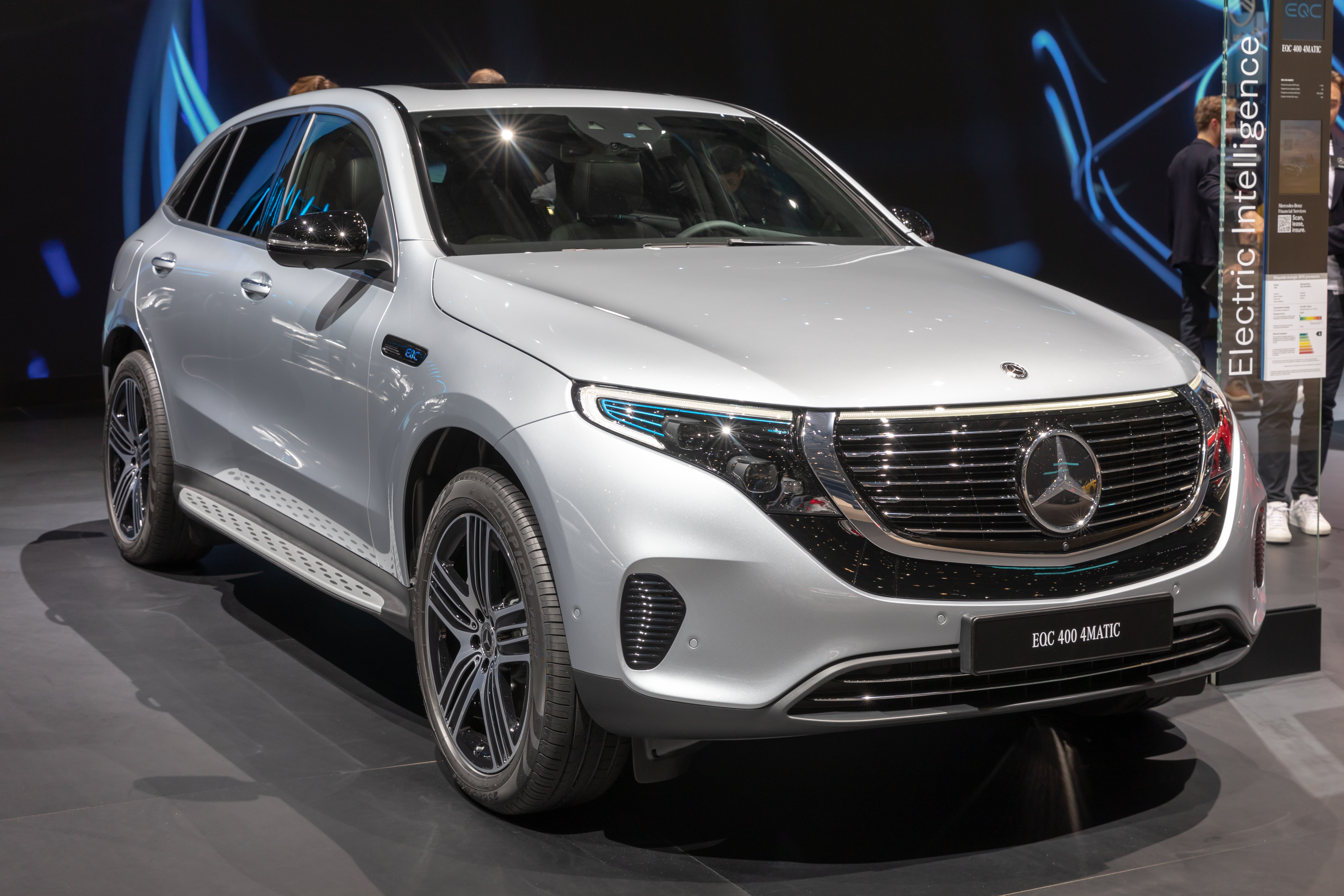
The Mercedes-Benz EQC was named the best car in Australia in 2019.

The adoption of plug-in electric vehicles in Australia has been driven mostly by state-based electric vehicle targets and monetary incentives to support the adoption and deployment of low- or zero-emission vehicles. The monetary incentives include electric vehicle subsidies, interest-free loans, registration exemptions, stamp duty exemptions, the luxury car tax exemption and discounted parking for both private and commercial purchases. The Clean Energy Finance Corporation, energy providers, car loan providers and car insurance providers also offer their own financial incentives for electric vehicle purchases including Macquarie Bank offering the lowest electric car loan of 2.99%.

The Victorian and New South Wales governments target between 50% and 53% of new car sales to be electric vehicles by 2030. The New South Wales Government also aim for the majority of new cars sold in the state to be electric vehicles by 2035. The New South Wales Government are also planning and stated they must ban the sale of internal combustion-engine vehicles by 2035. Similarly, the Victorian Government's "Infrastructure Victoria" initiative called for the government to ban the sale of petrol and diesel engine vehicles by 2035 at the latest. South Australia's government aimed for 100% of new car sales to be electric by 2035, and plan to ensure electric vehicles are mainstream and the "common choice" for new vehicle purchases in 2030. The ACT also plan for 100% of new car sales to be EVs by 2030. The Australian states with EV sales targets represent approximately 65% of the Australian population. This means 65% of the Australian population has a target to reach more than 50% EV car sales by 2030. However, this target could be reached sooner if the two largest states governments of New South Wales and Victoria enact their plan to ban the sale of petrol and diesel vehicles by 2035. The Australian government is planning and anticipating to have 1.7 million electric cars on the road by 2030. High adoption of electric vehicles could save Australian drivers $500 billion by 2035. While a slow uptake of electric vehicles would result in a 1 trillion cost to the Australian health system by 2050. Although air pollution would cause the deaths of at least 2500 people across Sydney and Melbourne in the year 2030, even if the federal government swiftly clamped down on poisonous car fuels.

A federal government target for 100% of car sales to be electric vehicles before 2050 could also be included in the Federal Government's National Electric Vehicle Strategy. This is because Prime Minister Scott Morrison stated in 2021 that the government's goal is to reach net-zero emissions by 2050, which would require a national transition to 100% electric vehicles before 2050. Scott Morrison also delivered a target for Australia to reach net-zero emissions by 2050 to the 2021 UN Climate Conference. Australia also backed the COP26 Breakthrough Agenda for electric vehicles to be the "new normal" worldwide by 2030. 60% of Australians also supported a net-zero emissions target by 2050. The New South Wales treasurer, Matt Kean, said the federal Nationals should resign if they didn't support a national target for net-zero emissions by 2050. To reach net-zero emissions by 2050, electric vehicles will also need to represent 50% of car sales by 2035. Although the Federal Government's projection in 2021, is for 30% of new car sales to be EVs by 2030. While Labor project 90% of new car sales to be EVs by 2030.

== Safety ==
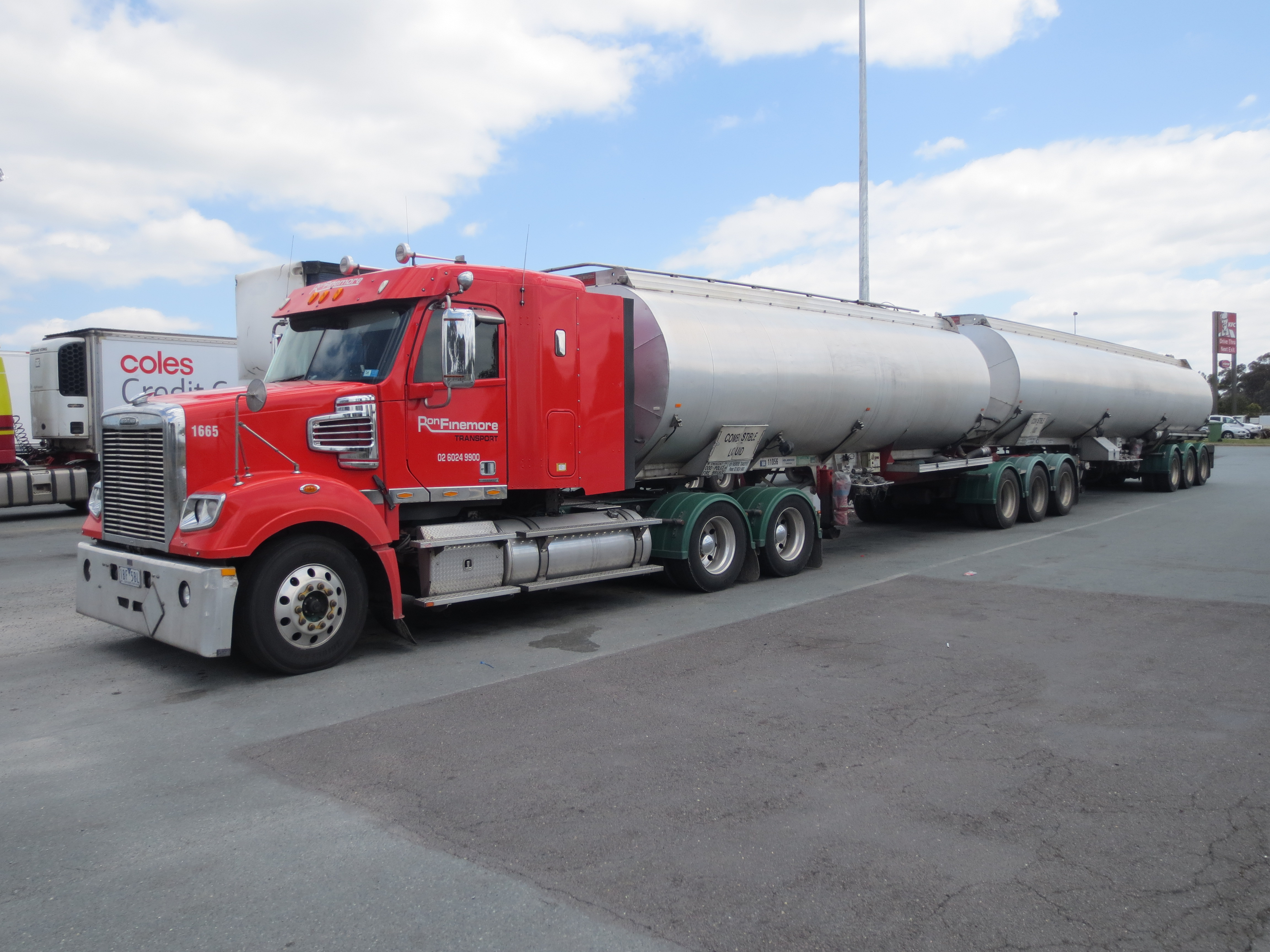
B double

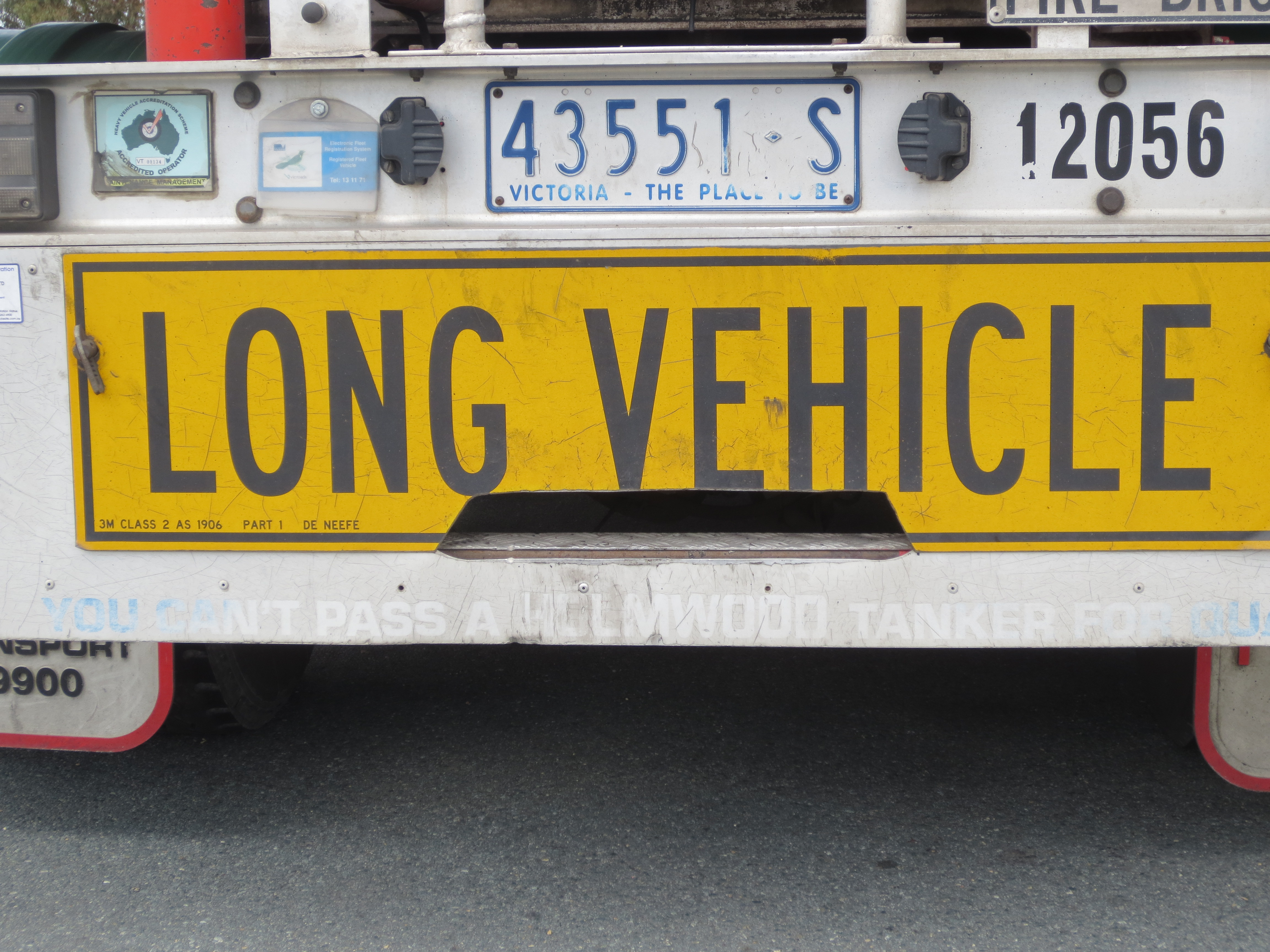
and safety sign on rear

Road transport safety in Australia is of a moderate to high standard. In 2018, fatalities is in the mean of the 30 OECD countries. Road quality, safety barriers and other safety features are of a moderate level in urban areas and of a high standard on new roads; however in regional areas and on some major highways, road quality can be severely affected by lack of funding for maintenance. Speed is limited to around 100 km/h on most highways.

In 2019, the number of people killed on Australian roads is estimated at 1,188 travelers that is 4.7% more than in 2018. This makes 4.7 travelers killed per 100,000 population

Vehicle safety is to a high standard. Many motorists cannot afford newer vehicles and as a result, the second-hand car market is quite large in Australia. There are many older model vehicles and while they require a Road Worthy Certificate (RWC) to ensure basic operation is sound, only newer vehicles have safety features such as crumple zones, air bags, etc. Seat belt usage is very high and Australia was the first country to make seatbelt use compulsory by law in 1970.

Several efforts have been made at educating the mass population about road safety, the most prominent and successful being the Victorian state Transport Accident Commission (TAC) road safety advertisements, which began in the late-1980s in print and television, which often depicted horrific and graphic road accidents initiated by various causes such as speed, alcohol and drug use, distraction, fatigue and many others. The TAC ads were very effective and reduced the death toll drastically. The method was subsequently adopted elsewhere in Australia and around the world.

Speed limits have been progressively reduced in urban streets, from 60 km/h to 50 km/h and more recently, to 40 km/h near schools, in built up areas and shopping strips. This is to ensure safer stopping distances to minimise/reduce pedestrian injuries and casualties.

Safety varies between remoteness area, from a rate of 2.64 in major cities in 2016, to a rate of 34.58 in remote areas

In 1992, first National Road Safety Strategy was established by federal, state and territory transport Ministers.

The 2001–2010 Australian safe-system strategy, achieved a fatality reduction rate of 34% for a reduction target of 40%.

=== Pedestrian safety ===
75.8% of fatal pedestrian crashes involved passenger cars or light commercial vehicles, between 2009 and 2013, and pedestrians older than 75 have the highest pedestrian fatality rate of any age group.

=== Fatality risk ===
An Australian study of the risk of deaths once the accident occurred found various possible factors. This study concludes that the risk of death is higher in rural area.

This study use the notion of odds ratio:

| Risk factor | Odd ratio | Risk factor (%) | Comment |
|---|---|---|---|
| Rural (vs Urban) | 1.91 | 91% | higher risk in rural zone than in urban zone |
| Sex (Male vs Woman) | 1.28 | 28% | higher risk for a male than a female |
| driver no restraint | 12.02 | | higher risk for without restraint driver than a driver with restraint |
| passenger no restraint | 13.02 | | higher risk for without restraint passenger than a driver with restraint |
| 70 km/h (vs 60 km/h) | 1.25 | 25% | risk of being killed is 25% higher at 70 km/h speed limit rather than at 60 km/h speed limit |
| Manufacture date | 0.82 | −18% | A car built in 2010 is safer than a car built in 2000 |

== Road naming ==
Each state has independent systems for the naming of roads. Roads in New South Wales are named in accordance with section 162 of The Roads Act 1993. Australian Standards AS 1742.5 - 1986 and AS 4212 - 1994 provide a list of road suffixes (such as Alley, Circle, Mall, Street) which are routinely accepted by the Geographical Names Board.

== Authorities ==
The Federal Government has had a number of statutory authorities relative to roads including: -

- Australian Transport Council
- National Transport Commission
- National Heavy Vehicle Regulator

State governments have been co-ordinated through: -

- Austroads (formerly the National Association of Australian State Road Authorities).

The state authorities are:

- New South Wales: Transport for NSW
- Queensland: Department of Transport & Main Roads
- South Australia: Department for Infrastructure & Transport
- Tasmania: Building Tasmania
- Victoria: VicRoads
- Western Australia: Main Roads Western Australia
