= Nonda, Queensland =

Nonda Maxwelton, Queensland
- Coordinates: 20.6805°S 142.4852°E
- Postcode(s): 4816
- Time zone: AEST (UTC+10:00)
- Location: 71.1 km (44 mi) W of Richmond; 185 km (115 mi) W of Hughenden; 570 km (354 mi) WSW of Townsville; 1,649 km (1,025 mi) NW of Brisbane
- LGA(s): Shire of Richmond
- State electorate(s): Traeger
- Federal division(s): Kennedy

Nonda is a rural town in the locality of Maxwelton in the Shire of Richmond, Queensland, Australia.

== Geography ==
Nonda railway station (20.6808°S 142.4821°E) is on the Great Northern Railway from Townsville to Mount Isa.

== History ==
The town of Nonda appears on a 1907 survey plan. The name Nonda is an Aboriginal word meaning the "plum" tree, Parinari nonda.

Nonda State School opened on 14 April 1925 and closed on 25 July 1975. It was at 12 Corella Street (20.6813°S 142.4857°E).

== Education ==
There are no schools in Nonda, nor nearby. The alternatives are distance education and boarding school.
