= Maxwelton, Queensland =

Maxwelton
- Town
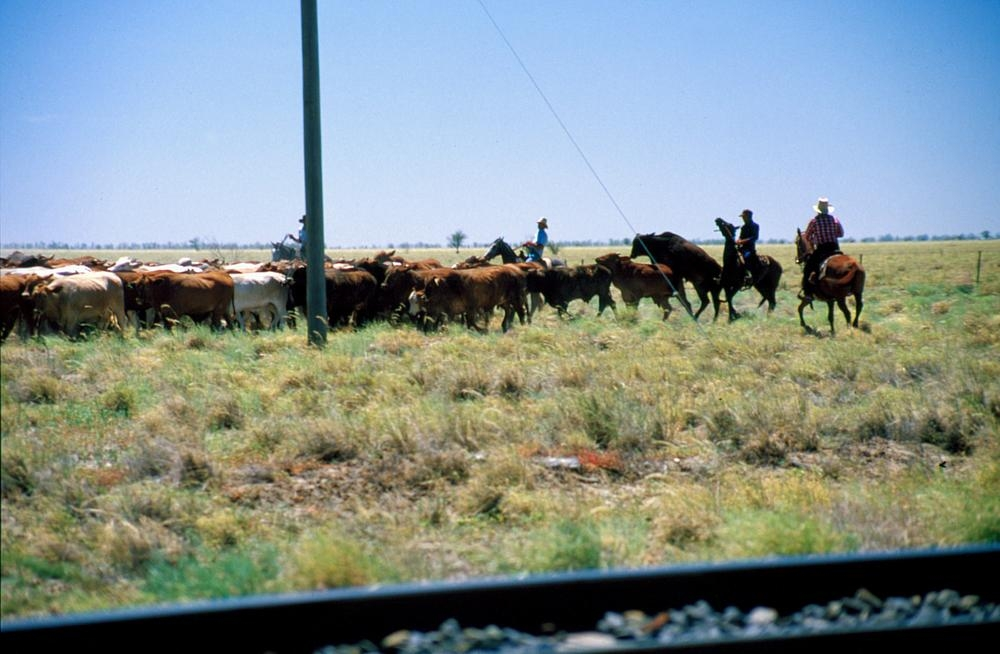
- Stockmen droving cattle near Maxwelton, 1986

- Interactive map of Maxwelton
- Coordinates: 20.7216°S 142.6805°E
- Country: Australia
- State: Queensland
- LGA: Shire of Richmond
- Location: 49.2 km (30.6 mi) W of Richmond; 100 km (62 mi) E of Julia Creek; 358 km (222 mi) E of Mount Isa; 547 km (340 mi) WSW of Townsville; 1,666 km (1,035 mi) NW of Brisbane

Government
  - State electorate: Traeger
  - Federal division: Kennedy

Area
  - Total: 3,526.4 km^{2} (1,361.6 sq mi)

Population
  - Total: 32 (2021 census)
  - Density: 0.00907/km^{2} (0.0235/sq mi)
- Time zone: UTC+10:00 (AEST)
- Postcode: 4822
Localities around Maxwelton
Malpas-Trenton	Cambridge	Burleigh
Julia Creek	Maxwelton	Richmond
Kynuna	Albion	Albion

Maxwelton is an outback rural town and locality in the Shire of Richmond in central north Queensland, Australia. In the 2021 census, the locality of Maxwelton had a population of 32 people.

== Geography ==
The locality is bounded to the north by the Flinders River. The town of Maxwelton is located in the north of the locality.

The Flinders Highway (from Townsville to Cloncurry) enters the locality from the north-east (Richmond), bypasses the town of Maxwelton to the immediate south, and exits to the north-west (Julia Creek).

The Great Northern railway from Townsville to Mount Isa runs mostly immediately parallel to the highway, entering from the north-east (Richmond), but passing through the town, and then exiting to the north-west (Julia Creek). The locality is served by three railway stops (from west to east):

- Nonda railway station (20.6808°S 142.4821°E)
- Maxwelton railway station, serves the town (20.7206°S 142.6794°E)
- Talmoi railway station, east of the town of Maxwelton (approx 20.7239°S 142.7286°E)
- Gemoka railway station, serves the rural areas in the east of the locality (20.7336°S 142.8850°E)

There are other towns and neighbourhoods in the locality (from west to east):

- Nonda, a mostly-abandoned town in the north-west of the locality (20.6805°S 142.4852°E)
- Hulbert, an abandoned town in the far north of the locality (20.6602°S 142.6388°E), just south of the Fitzroy River
- Talmoi, a neighbourhood around the former Talmoi railway station, east of the town of Maxwelton (20.7239°S 142.72861°E)
- Bundock, an abandoned town in the north-east of the locality (20.6627°S 142.8933°E), just south of O'Connell Creek (20.65°S 142.8666°E), a tributary of the Fitzoy River

The land use is predominantly grazing on native vegetation.

== History ==
In 1863, horser breeder Wellington Cochrane Bundock (1812-1898) formed a partnership with Walter Hayes to graze cattle on the Richmond Downs pastoral run (the origin of the town of Richmond).

Before the railway, bullock teams carted wool from Cloncurry to the east coast, and Cobb & Co stage coaches travelled through with mail in 1871. Several hotels were being built along the Flinders River route, all of which are now in ruins and only recognisable by old stumps or an occasional post here and there. Pastoral holdings were then much larger and in this area, they included Tarbrax, Maxwelton, Clutha and Saxby.

Maxwelton was a small railway siding, 50 kilometres (31 mi) west of Richmond. It derived its name from Maxwelton Station, one of the original pastoral holdings taken up in the 1800s. This station is just south of the rail siding.

The towns of Bundock and Hulbert were surveyed in 1899 and gazetted in 1900. Bundock is named after Wellington Cochrane Bundock. Bundock was at the midpoint of a stock route between the towns of Maxwelton and Richmond.

The town of Nonda first appears on a 1907 survey plan. The name Nonda is an Aboriginal word referring to the "plum" tree, Parinari nonda.

The site for the Maxwelton township was chosen in 1908, at the junction of the new railway line and the road from McKinlay to the Camp Hotel on the Flinders River.

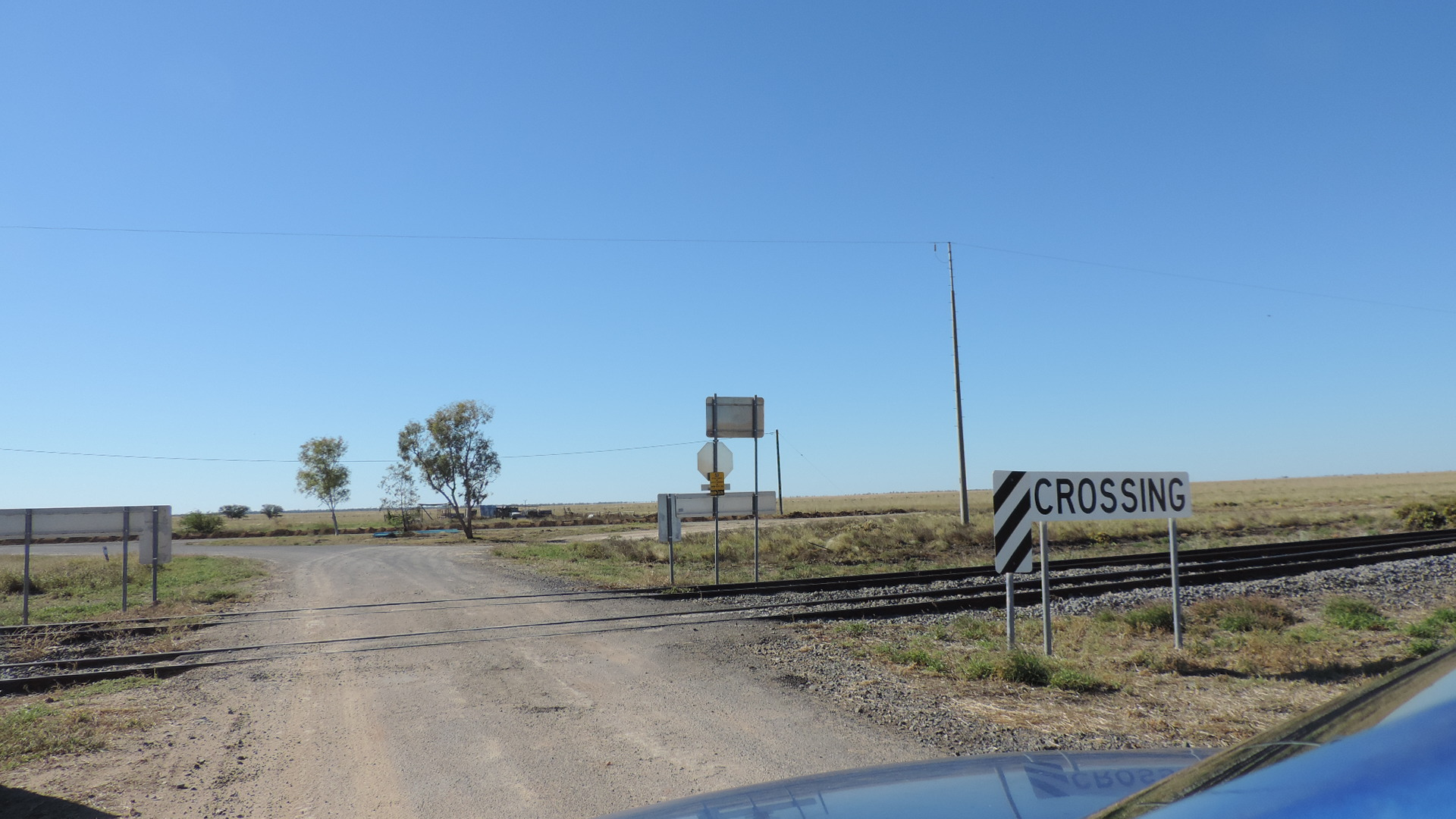
Railway crossing at Maxwelton, 2019

The first sod was turned to begin work on this Great Northern Railway in Townsville in 1879, and by February 1908 it had reached Julia Creek.

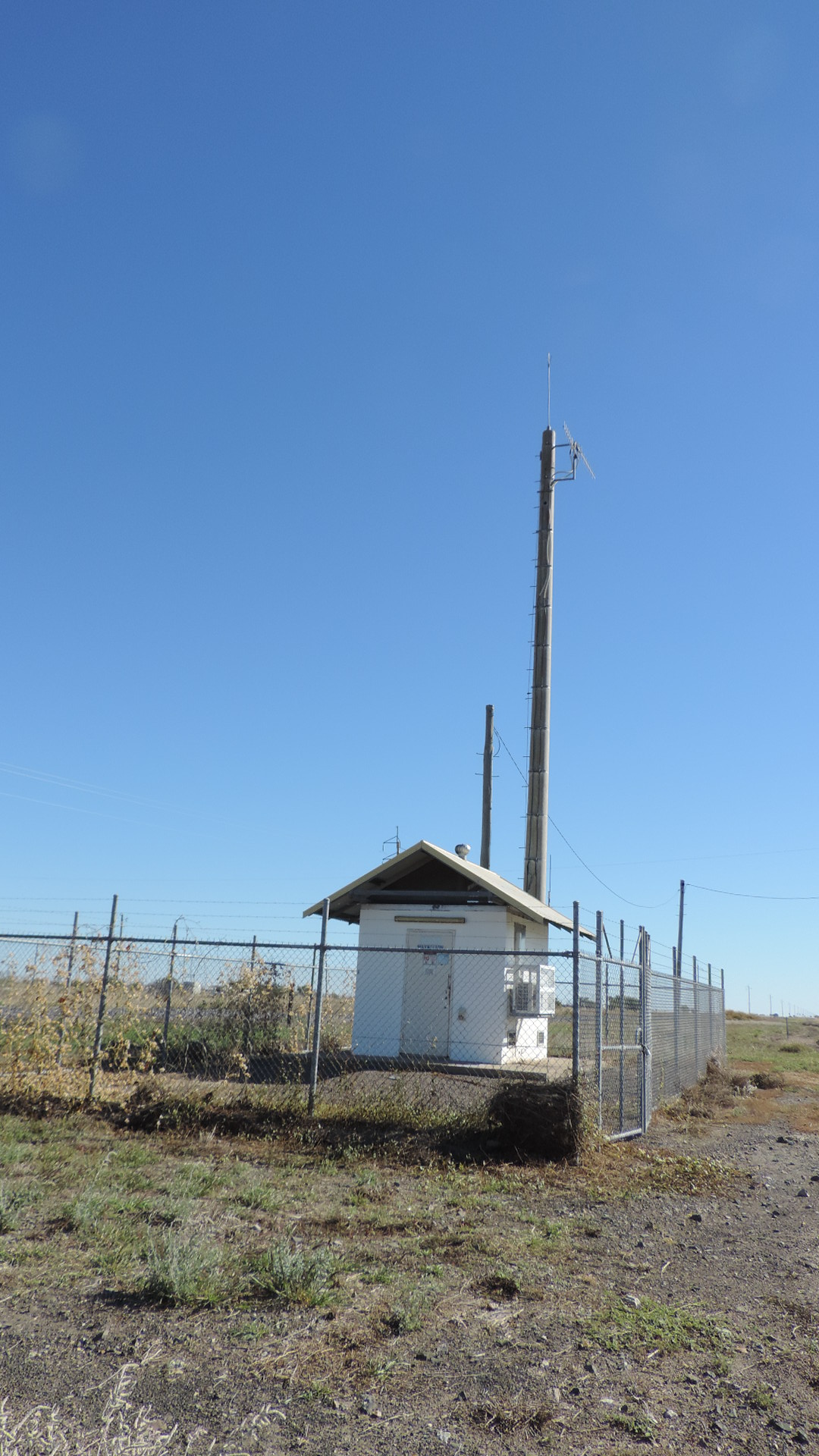
Telecommunications shed, 2019

The original Post Office began as a receiving office in 1880. It closed and opened many times firstly in 1885, reopening in 1891 and closing again in 1895. It was again reopened in 1907 when the Chatfield Creek receiving office some twelve miles away closed. It was elevated to a Post Office at the Railway Station in February 1910. It became an official post office in 1915. It was moved to its later position in 1928. In 1970 the Post Office was run in conjunction with Postmaster-General's Department as one of the last manual telephone exchanges in Australia. On 1 September 1970 the post office was downgraded to a Post Office Agency. On 6 April 1990 the Post Office Agency ceased. A Community Mail Bag was then put into operation.

In 1892, an artesian bore was drilled to a depth of 1,300 feet (396 m) on the Maxwelton pastoral run. It produced water at a temperature of 112 °F (44 °C).

The neighbourhood of Talmoi takes its name from the former Talmoi railway station. The name was chosen by the Queensland Railways in 1912 and is an Aboriginal word meaning a place to camp.

Maxwelton is situated on a low flood plain and its biggest flood on record was in 1917. As the flood waters rose, large numbers of snakes and centipedes sought refuge in the hotel and homesteads with residents needing to kill many snakes.

A bridge was completed in 1926 called Hulberts Bridge. The Camp Hotel was known locally as the "one-eye" after one of its owners who had one eye, a one eyed horse and a one eyed dog.

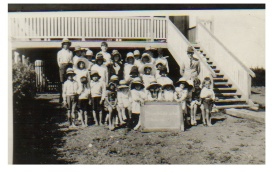
Maxwelton State School Teacher and Pupils

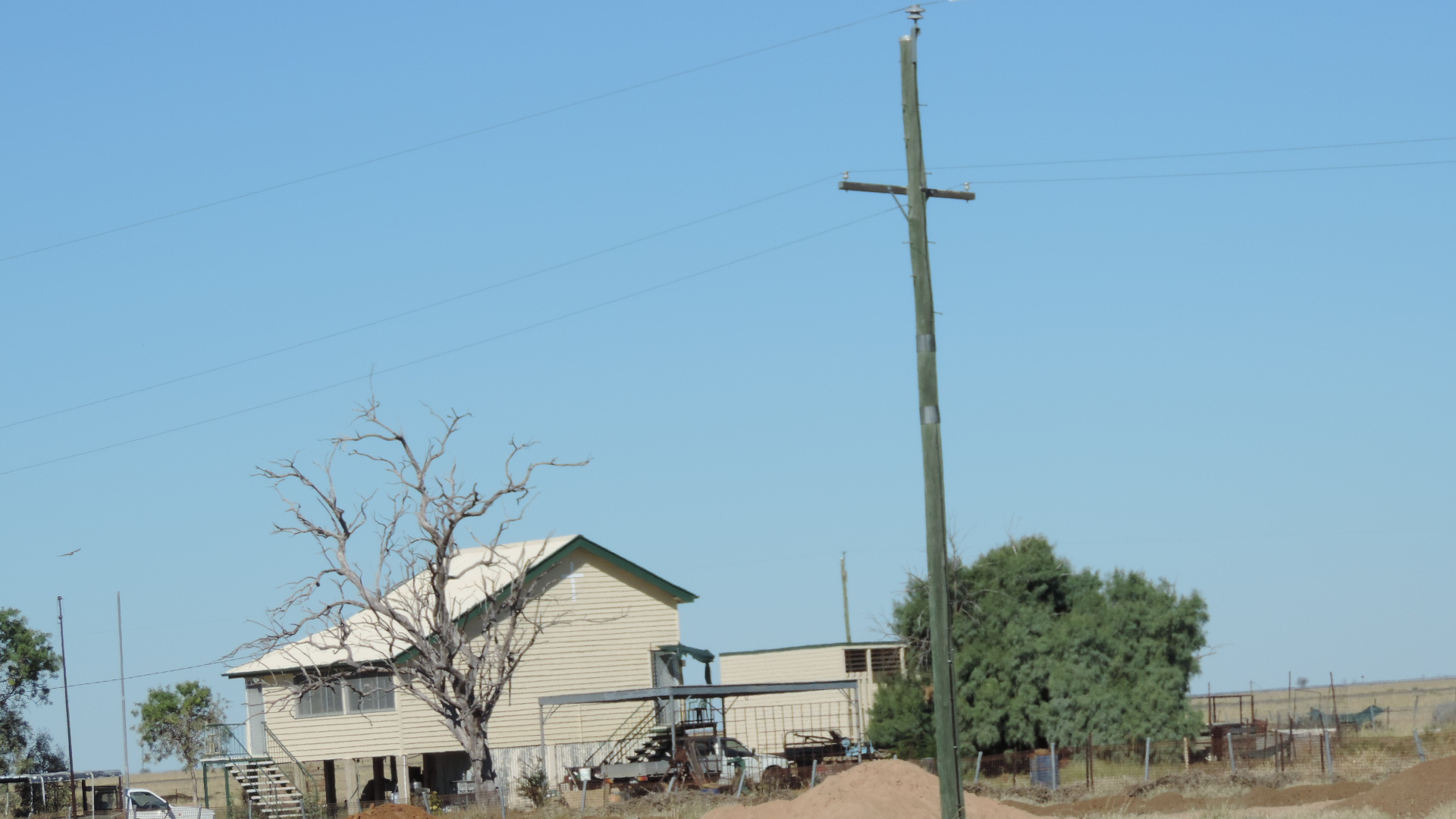
Former Maxwelton State School (now a house), 2019

Maxwelton Provisional School opened on 15 November 1923, becoming Maxwelton State School on 23 April 1925. It closed in 1926 but reopened in July 1927. It closed permanently in 1989. The school was in School Road (20.7217°S 142.6816°E). The school building is now used as a house.

Nonda State School opened on 14 April 1925 and closed on 25 July 1975. It was in Corella Street (20.6813°S 142.4857°E).

Gemoka railway siding was named by the Queensland Railways on 18 September 1925. Gemoka is an Aboriginal word meaning cattle camp.

During World War II, chemical weapons were stored at Talmoi. On 31 July 1943, it was decided by the Royal Australian Air Force (RAAF) to store 40% of the chemical weapons stocks in north-east Queensland. Talmoi wool scour was subsequently chosen as the specific location for RAAF No.4 Central Explosives Reserve (20.7194°S 142.7448°E), because it had a bore with running water in addition to storage sheds and living quarters, it had a railway siding on the Great Northern railway line to Townsville (a major military site during the War of the Pacific), and it was a safe distance from any other settlement. Further buildings, roadworks and other earthworks were undertaken. In September 1944, a total of 2,550 phosgene bombs were transported by rail from Lithgow, New South Wales to Talmoi. Each bomb was 250 pounds (110 kg). The bombs were stored in reinforced concrete igloo-like structures, while a corrugated iron shed was used to store mustard gas canisters. After the war in January 1946, the RAAF destroyed all the chemical weapons at Talmoi (then estimated as 28,000 phosgen bombs) by shooting each bomb with a bullet, releasing the gas. The RAAF formally decommissioned the facility in February 1946. The bomb casings were then used by local people as building materials until December 1948 when the McKinlay Shire Council reported that mustard gas was still in some of the bomb casings. The RAAF initially denied this could be so stating that the weapons had all been destroyed, but nonetheless initiated an investigation. In September 1949, the public was advised to notify the RAAF in Townsville if they had any "empty bombs" in their possession. A number of the igloo-shaped bomb storage structures remain on the site.

In days gone by, the little township had a café, butchers shop, a dance hall, a pub, a post office and a school.The main occupants of the town were rail workers who had a row of fettlers cottages along the southern side of the rail track which carried two trains a day - The 44 up to Mt Isa and the 19 down to Townsville. These trains brought in most supplies. With the road trip to Richmond taking up to one and a half hours each way, the shopping trip to Weekly's store in Richmond was a full day outing.

The Maxwelton School was closed due to lack of children, but has had as many as 35 pupils enrolled in the past. The school first began in the old butchers shop in 1923, and the teacher was given board and lodging at the North Star Hotel for one pound per week. The first official school building was built on five acres of land south of the railway line in 1925 where it still stands today.

For the last 61 years the annual Maxwelton races have occurred at the town's racecourse on the southern side of the Flinders Highway. The future of the race is currently in doubt, but there has been a recent revival in public interest.

The town received national media attention in 1989 when a chemical weapon stockpile was found in the town, similar to the 1,000 pound phosgene bombs found at Embi Airfield, part of the Dobodura Airfield Complex in Papua New Guinea.

== Demographics ==
In the 2016 census, the locality of Maxwelton had a population of 22 people.

In the 2021 census, the locality of Maxwelton had a population of 32 people.

== Education ==
There are no schools in Maxwelton. The nearest government school is Richmond State School in neighbouring Richmond offers primary schooling and secondary schooling to Year 10. There are no nearby schoolls providing education to Year 12. Also, due to the distances involved, Richmond State School would not be accessible to students outside the north-east part of Maxwelton. Distance education and boarding schools are the alternatives.
