= Bundock, Queensland =

Bundock Queensland
- Coordinates: 20.6627°S 142.8933°E
- Postcode(s): 4822
- Time zone: AEST (UTC+10:00)
- Location: 30.7 km (19 mi) WNW of Richmond; 145 km (90 mi) WNW of Hughenden; 529 km (329 mi) WSW of Townsville; 1,608 km (999 mi) NW of Brisbane
- LGA(s): Shire of Richmond
- State electorate(s): Traeger
- Federal division(s): Kennedy

Bundock is an abandoned rural town in the Shire of Richmond, Queensland, Australia. The town is within the locality of Maxwelton.

== Geography ==
The town is just south of O'Connell Creek. Bundock was (and still is) at the midpoint of a stock route between the towns of Maxwelton and Richmond.

There are 10 half-acre town lots, but there are no buildings nor signs of any development.

== History ==
The town was surveyed by Frank A. Gorringe on 14 December 1899 and gazetted as a town on 10 February 1900.

Bundock is named after horse breeder Wellington Cochrane Bundock (1812–1898). In 1863, Bundock formed a partnership with Walter Hayes to graze cattle on the Richmond Downs pastoral run (the origin of the town of Richmond).
