= Richmond–Winton Road =

Road in Queensland, Australia

Richmond–Winton Road Queensland

General information
- Type: Rural road
- Length: 145 km (90 mi)
- Route number(s): no shield

Major junctions
- North end: Flinders Highway Richmond
- South end: Landsborough Highway Corfield

Richmond–Winton Road is a continuous 145 kilometres (90 mi) road route in the Richmond and Winton local government areas of Queensland, Australia. It is a state-controlled district road (number 5803) rated as a local road of regional significance (LRRS). It is part of the shortest route from the Croydon / Georgetown area to Winton and Longreach. It is also part of the inland freight network linking cattle properties to major freight routes on the Landsborough and Flinders highways.

== Route description ==
The Richmond–Winton Road commences at an intersection with the Flinders Highway in Richmond, about 3.7 kilometres (2.3 mi) west of the town. It runs generally south-west through Richmond and Albion, and then roughly follows the boundary between Corfield and Kynuna, ending at an intersection with the Landsborough Highway at the Corfield / Kynuna midpoint. This intersection is about 80 kilometres (50 mi) north-west of Winton.

Land use along this road is mainly stock grazing on native vegetation. There are no major intersections on this road.

== Road condition ==
Much of the road remains unsealed, but approximately 9.5 kilometres (5.9 mi) was sealed in 2018–19 under an $4.7 million project funded by the Northern Australia Beef Roads Program. In July 2021 the Minister for Transport and Main Roads announced the following projects, funded by various other arrangements, for the road:

- Culvert replacement: $2.7 million to replace two culverts - completed December 2020.
- Progressive sealing: $3.3 million to seal over 4 kilometres (2.5 mi) - completion expected July 2021.
- Widen and seal: $13 million to seal 20 kilometres (12 mi) - completion expected mid 2022.
- Pave and seal: $5.39 million to seal 6.7 kilometres (4.2 mi) - completion expected July 2021.

As at April 2022 the road has approximately 140 kilometres (87 mi) single lane sealed, split into sections, and approximately 88 kilometres (55 mi) single lane unsealed.

Note that the sum of the distances given in this reference is greater than the distance calculated by Google maps. It is assumed that it includes the distance from Richmond to the northern end of the road and the distance from the southern end of the road to Winton.

== Upgrade ==
A project to pave and seal two sections of road, at a cost of $10.27 million, was completed in June 2022. It is unclear if this is part of the projects announced in July 2021.

== History ==
Richmond Downs pastoral run was established in 1864. Gold was discovered at Woolgar, just north of Richmond, in 1880, and Richmond became a stagecoach stop for prospectors on the way to Woolgar. The town was surveyed in 1882, and the railway arrived in 1904. Other pastoral runs were established in the area, and the town soon became the administrative centre for the district.

After a short attempt at settlement in 1866 the first European settler came to what is now Winton in about 1875 to set up a shop and public house. Winton began as a town about 1878 when a group of businessmen decided that a town site proposed by the government further west was unsuitable. The proposed site became a ghost town and Winton became the administrative centre for the district. Pastoral runs were established in the area, including Corfield Downs, about 100 kilometres (62 mi) to the north.

Early roads were cut from both Richmond and Winton to provide access for wheeled vehicles to the pastoral runs and other settlements. Over time these tracks were improved and extended to eventually form a through road.

== Modern usage ==
Although not yet fully sealed the road is used extensively by road trains carrying cattle, and by other large trucks conveying heavy goods.
