= Bundock =

Bundock may refer to:

== Musicians ==
- Bündock, a Canadian band

== People ==
- Darren Bundock (born 1971), Australian sailor
- Sally Bundock (born 1972), British news presenter
- Nicholas Bundock (born 1973), British Anglican bishop

== Places ==
- Bundock, Queensland, a town in the Shire of Richmond, Australia
