= St John the Baptist Anglican Church, Richmond =

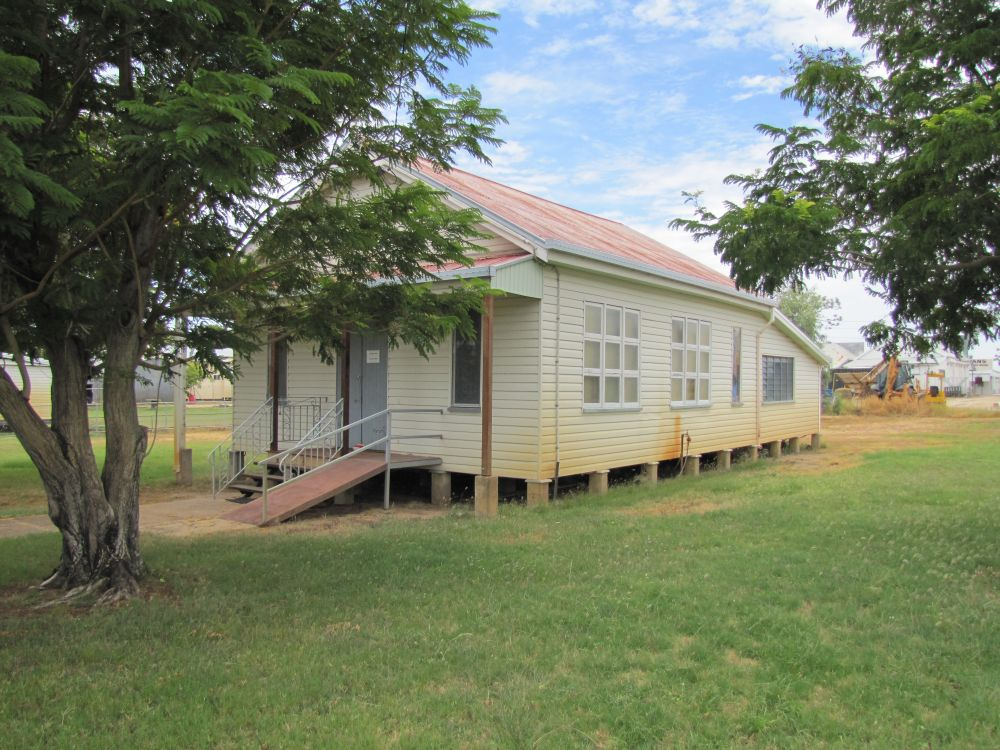
- St John the Baptist Anglican Church, 2014

- Location within Queensland Location within Australia
- 20.7301°S 143.141°E
- Location: Crawford Street, Richmond, Shire of Richmond, Queensland, Australia

History
- Design period: 1900–1914 (early 20th century)
- Built: 1909–1988

Queensland Heritage Register
- Official name: St John the Baptist Anglican Church Complex
- Type: state heritage (landscape, built)
- Designated: 25 February 2000
- Reference no.: 601714
- Significant period: 1900s–1910s (historical) ongoing (social)
- Significant components: church, stained glass window/s, memorial – plaque, church hall/sunday school hall, formation – tramway, furniture/fittings
- Builders: Mr Moore of Hughenden

St John the Baptist Anglican Church is a heritage-listed church at Crawford Street, Richmond, Shire of Richmond, Queensland, Australia. It was built in 1909 by Mr Moore of Hughenden. It was added to the Queensland Heritage Register on 25 February 2000.

== History ==
St John the Baptist Church, Richmond, was constructed in 1909 by Mr Moore of Hughenden.

Richmond developed in the late nineteenth century on the banks of a waterhole on the Flinders River, primarily as a service centre for the extensive merino sheep and cattle grazing pastoral activities of the region.

By 1878 the Anglican Church had established a presence in North Queensland under the leadership of George Frodsham, the Bishop of North Queensland.

In order to serve the isolated northern and western areas the members of the Anglican Synod of North Queensland proposed the establishment of the Bush Brotherhood of St James. This was probably the first time in Australia that a diocese planned to establish the Bush Brotherhood in its area. Although the proposal was approved, nothing happened until 1903 when a Bush Brother was appointed to Herberton as a mission priest. In 1909, at Cloncurry, Edward Travers Crozier was installed as head of the North Queensland Bush Brotherhood.

A report in North Queensland 1878–1958 80 Years of Anglican Progress says that the Brotherhood of St Barnabas also worked in the Richmond Parish. Despite the fact that there was no church building, Bishop Frodsham held services in a dance hall attached to a hotel and later in the Richmond Court House where he used the magistrates bench as a pulpit.

During a tour of the west in 1904 Bishop Frodsham was reported to be advising the Richmond church community about the construction of a church. In The Northern Churchman, December 1906, reference was made to the efforts of the community to double the amount of £105 in the Church Building Fund. By 1907 plans and specifications had been approved for the erection of an Anglican church at Richmond. The church was to be called after St John the Baptist and was to be erected on land donated by Thomas Cox of Hughenden.

In 1908 the Society for the Promotion of Christian Knowledge granted £30 towards the construction of an Anglican church at Richmond. Reverend Canon Walter Williams, returning to North Queensland from England, reported to the Richmond congregation that he had been given a silver chalice and paten for the yet-to-be-constructed church in the town. When Bishop Frodsham visited Richmond in July 1909 he dedicated the newly constructed church. Monthly services were held in the new St John the Baptist Church, with the rector travelling from Hughenden. In 1911 the Church Building Committee reported that the debt on the building was still being paid off. Further reports indicated that the congregation expected to start painting and fencing the church and also that the belfry had been erected and a bell installed. The church could boast a small organ by 1911.

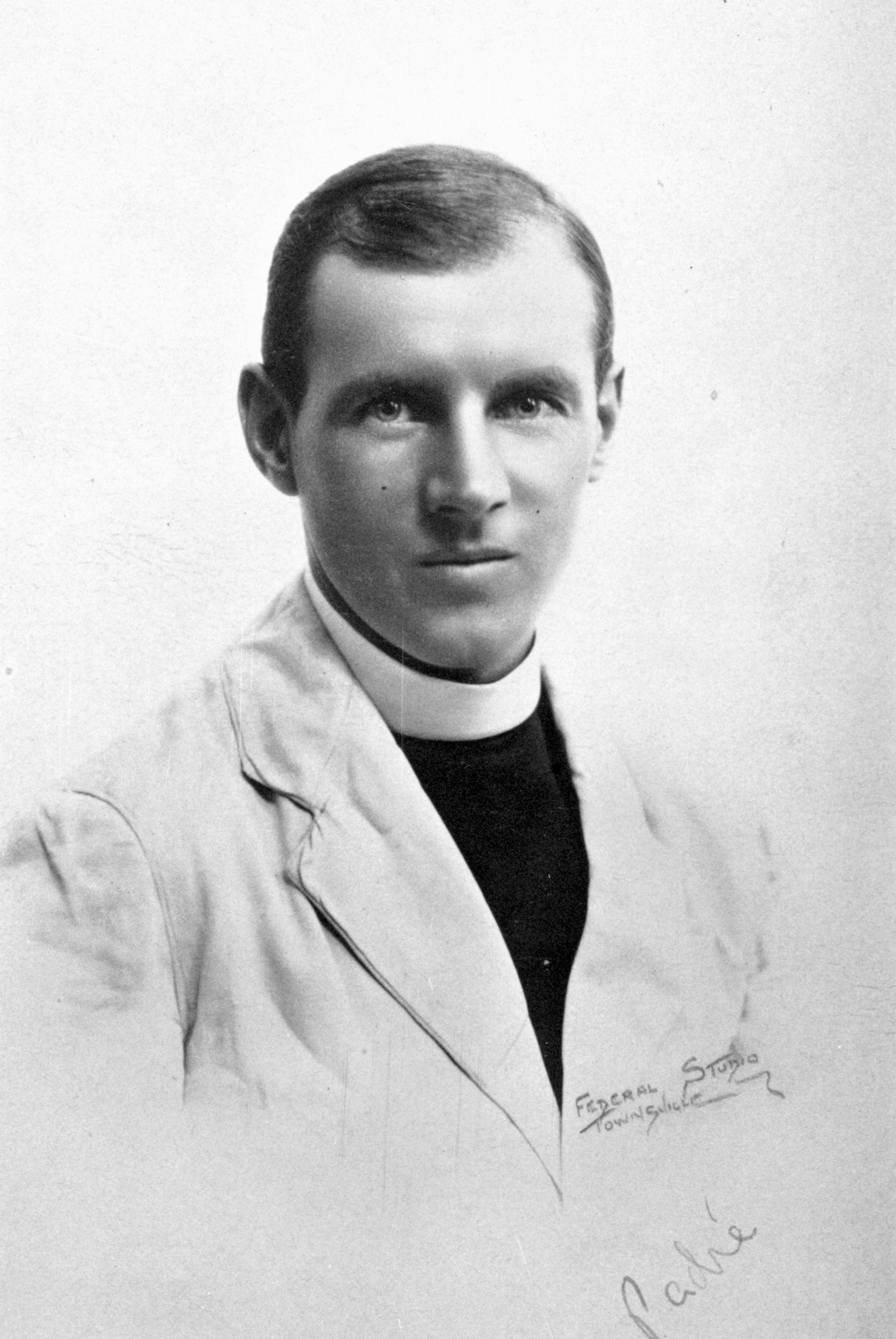
Reverend Harold Hodson, Bush Brother stationed at Richmond, 1913-1916

By 1909 Hughenden had one priest and one deacon to serve 80,000 square miles. To overcome the shortage of priests the Anglican Synod sought young, unmarried priests from outside the region to serve in North Queensland. By 1913 a Bush Brother had been appointed to Richmond and a large room and verandah added to the vestry for his accommodation.

While the Richmond community continued to depend on sheep and cattle for its livelihood, it received a boost during World War Two when an airstrip was constructed outside the town. During the wool boom of the 1950s the Richmond district was host to large teams of shearers and station workers, creating a vibrant economy. During this period there was a building boom including the construction of Housing Commission homes. The construction of the rail extension from Hughenden to Richmond and Mt Isa in the 1960s also gave the local economy a boost.

During those years the Anglican Church continued to play a significant role in the Richmond community. A front fence and steel entrance gates were dedicated in 1951, and a steel-framed bell tower in 1981. The church building was clad with metal sheeting and two stained glass windows were added in the front facade in 1988; two stained glass windows were installed in the side walls to the sanctuary c. 1997.

== Description ==
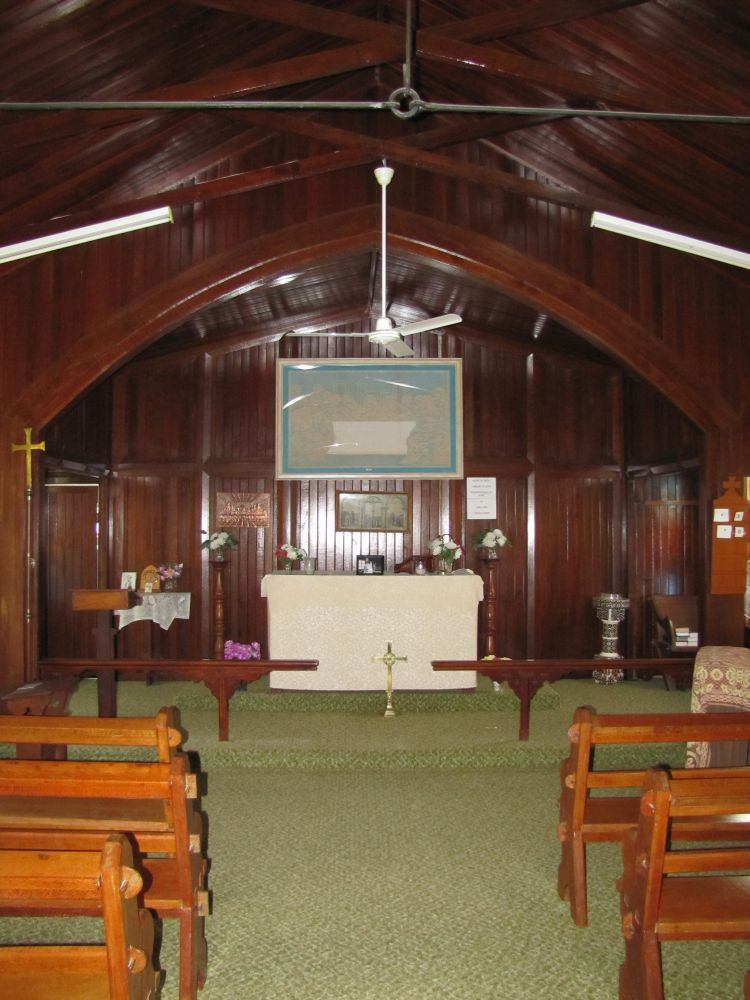
Interior, 2014

St John the Baptist Anglican Church, Richmond is a small, rectangular, single-storeyed timber building with a gabled corrugated iron roof. Attached to the rear of the building is a skillion-roofed extension accommodating several rooms, and there is a skillion-roofed open verandah across the front facade. The church stands in the front half of a flat, grassed block fronting Crawford Street, which is parallel to, and one block from Goldring Street, the main street of Richmond. Apart from backing onto the commercial properties of the main street, the area has mainly residential buildings.

The church is approached via a set of decorative wrought steel gates, and a pathway flanked by two trees. To the north-west of the church is a steel bell tower.

The exterior cladding of the building is chamferboard, which has been covered with aluminium sheeting of a similar profile. The building sits on low concrete stumps.

The front entry door has two leaves with stop-chamfered rails and tongue-and-groove boarding, and decorative early iron hinges.

Internally, the nave and sanctuary combined measure approximately 7 by 9 metres (23 ft × 30 ft). Most of the internal finishes of the building are silky oak, including the varnished v-jointed tongue-and-groove boards lining the walls and raked ceiling; the timber scissor trusses of the roof framing, which are exposed internally; the arch of the sanctuary; and the altar rails.

The nave is furnished with eight silky oak pews with pegged joints, and the table used as the altar is also silky oak. Mounted on the wall of the nave is a memorial board, which includes plaques commemorating the dedication of the altar rails in 1906, the gates and fence in 1951, and the bell tower in 1981.

To either side of the entry doors are two tall stained glass windows signed by Oliver Cowley and dated 1988, one depicting John the Baptist and the other the baptism of Christ. To the side walls at either side of the sanctuary are two further stained glass windows, installed in the 1990s, in commemoration of pioneering men and women.

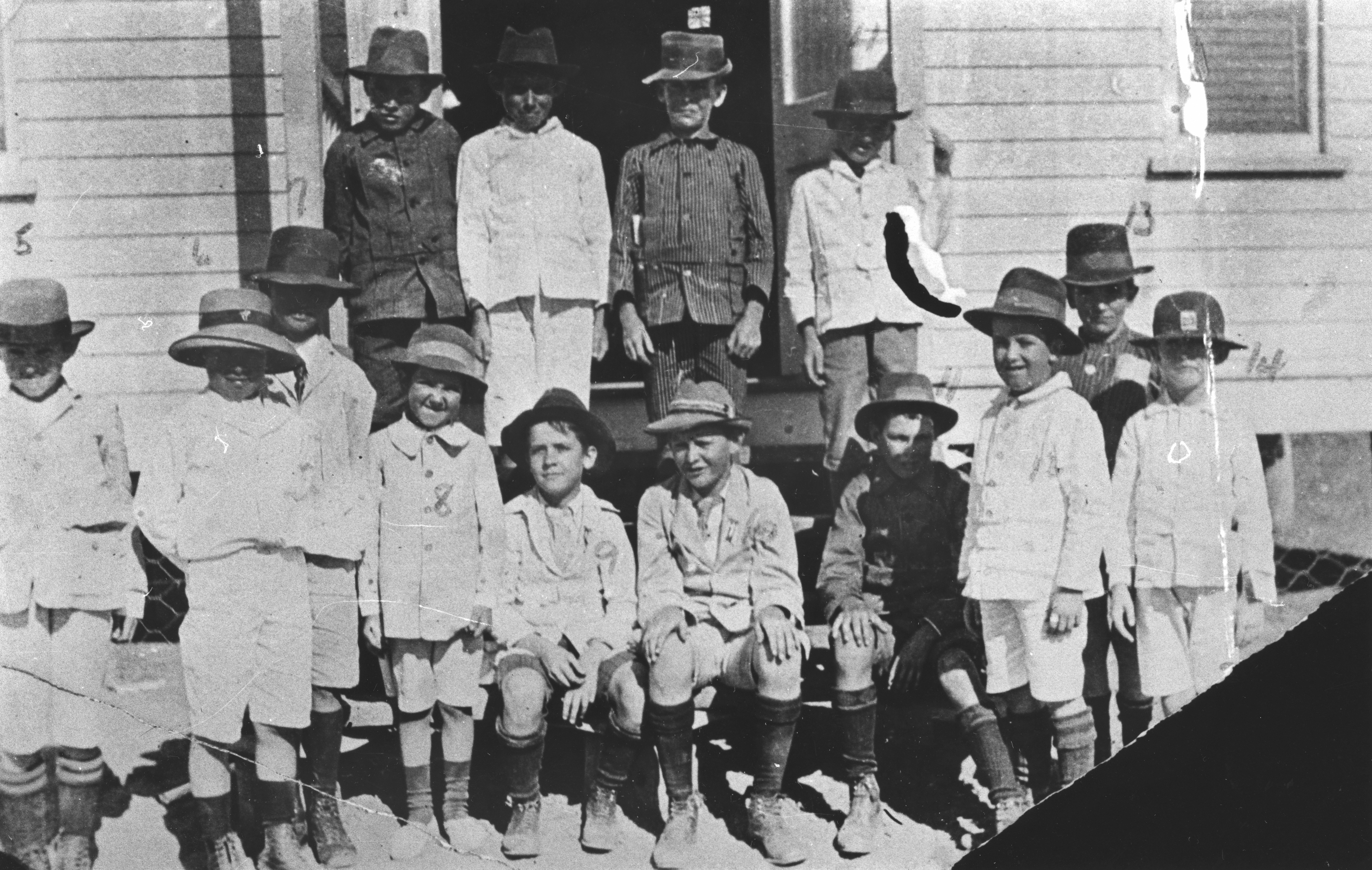
Children attending Sunday School at the Church of England in Richmond, circa 1914

The extension to the rear is centrally divided, with bathroom facilities added at the south-east corner. Its walls and raked ceiling are lined with fibrous cement sheets. Furniture in this extension includes wardrobes, a lectern, a bellows organ and an iron bed.

== Heritage listing ==
St John the Baptist Anglican Church in Richmond was listed on the Queensland Heritage Register on 25 February 2000 having satisfied the following criteria.

The place is important in demonstrating the evolution or pattern of Queensland's history.

St John the Baptist Church at Richmond, constructed in 1909, is important in demonstrating the expansion of the work of the Anglican Church in small western Queensland communities in the late nineteenth and early twentieth centuries, particularly the influence of the Bush Brotherhood in establishing parishes and church buildings in remote towns.

The place is important because of its aesthetic significance.

The interior of the building, which remains highly intact, has a strong aesthetic appeal generated by the clear varnished silky oak lining boards, joinery, furniture and memorials. This interior remains important in demonstrating the aesthetic possibilities of simply-designed, small timber churches of this era.

The place has a special association with the life or work of a particular person, group or organisation of importance in Queensland's history.

The place has a special association with the Bush Brotherhood movement in western Queensland.
