= Parinari rigida =

Scientific classification
- Kingdom: Plantae
- Clade: Tracheophytes
- Clade: Angiosperms
- Clade: Eudicots
- Clade: Rosids
- Order: Malpighiales
- Family: Chrysobalanaceae
- Genus: Parinari
- Species: P. rigida

Binomial name
- Parinari rigida Kosterm.

Synonyms
- Parinari ashtonii Kosterm.

Species of tree

Parinari rigida is a tree in the family Chrysobalanaceae. The specific epithet rigida is from the Latin meaning 'stiff', referring to the leaves.

== Description ==
Parinari rigida grows up to 30 metres (100 ft) tall. The bark is smooth. The ellipsoid fruits measure up to 5 cm (2 in) long.

== Distribution and habitat ==
Parinari rigida grows naturally in Sumatra, Peninsular Malaysia and Borneo. Its habitat is heath and swamp forests from sea-level to 1,400 metres (4,600 ft) altitude.
