= Albion, Queensland (Richmond Shire) =

Albion
- Suburb
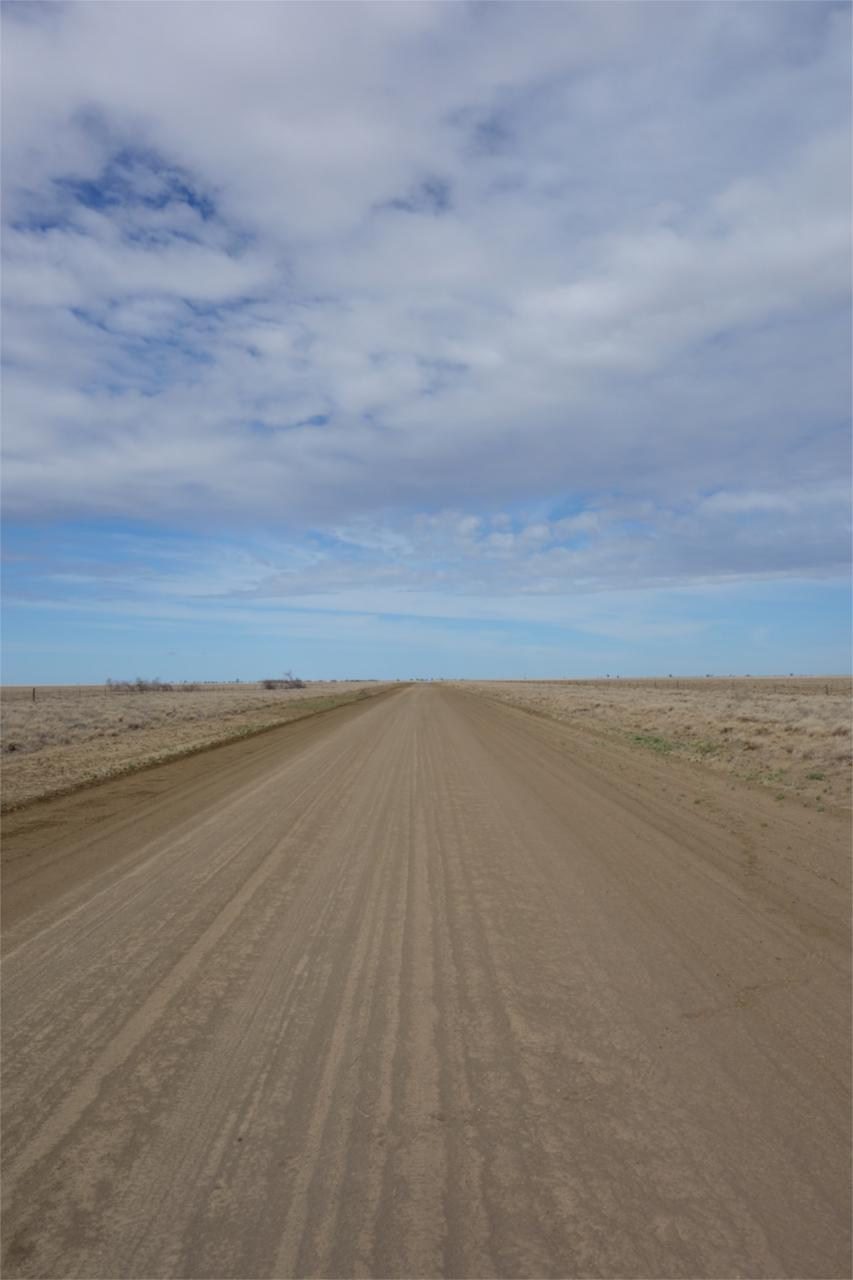
- On the Richmond-Winton Road at Albion, 2013

- Interactive map of Albion
- Coordinates: 21.3372°S 142.6252°E
- Country: Australia
- State: Queensland
- LGA: Shire of Richmond
- Location: 113 km (70 mi) SW of Richmond; 421 km (262 mi) ESE of Mount Isa; 611 km (380 mi) WSW of Townsville; 1,519 km (944 mi) NW of Brisbane

Government
  - State electorate: Traeger
  - Federal division: Kennedy

Area
  - Total: 5,538.5 km^{2} (2,138.4 sq mi)

Population
  - Total: 34 (2021 census)
  - Density: 0.00614/km^{2} (0.01590/sq mi)
- Time zone: UTC+10:00 (AEST)
- Postcode: 4822
Suburbs around Albion
Maxwelton	Maxwelton	Richmond
Kynuna	Albion	Stamford
Kynuna	Kynuna	Corfield

Albion is an outback locality in the Shire of Richmond, Queensland, Australia. In the 2021 census, Albion had a population of 34 people.

== Geography ==
The Landsborough Highway passes the south-western corner, near Kynuna. The Richmond–Winton Road runs through from north to south-east.

== Demographics ==
In the 2016 census, Albion had a population of 16 people.

In the 2021 census, Albion had a population of 34 people.

== Education ==
There are no schools in Albion, nor anywhere nearby. The alternatives are distance education and boarding schools are options.
