= Parinari klugii =

Conservation status
- Least Concern (IUCN 3.1)

Scientific classification
- Kingdom: Plantae
- Clade: Tracheophytes
- Clade: Angiosperms
- Clade: Eudicots
- Clade: Rosids
- Order: Malpighiales
- Family: Chrysobalanaceae
- Genus: Parinari
- Species: P. klugii

Binomial name
- Parinari klugii Prance

Species of tree

Parinari klugii is a species of tree in the family Chrysobalanaceae. It is native to South America.
