= Parinari canarioides =

Conservation status
- Least Concern (IUCN 3.1)

Scientific classification
- Kingdom: Plantae
- Clade: Tracheophytes
- Clade: Angiosperms
- Clade: Eudicots
- Clade: Rosids
- Order: Malpighiales
- Family: Chrysobalanaceae
- Genus: Parinari
- Species: P. canarioides

Binomial name
- Parinari canarioides Kosterm.

Species of tree

Parinari canarioides is a tree in the family Chrysobalanaceae. The specific epithet canarioides is for the species' resemblance to the genus Canarium.

== Description ==
Parinari canarioides grows up to 60 metres (200 ft) tall. The dark red-brown bark is smooth, occasionally fissured. The ellipsoid fruits are edible and measure up to 5 cm (2 in) long.

== Distribution and habitat ==
Parinari canarioides grows naturally in Sumatra, Borneo, the Philippines and Sulawesi. Its habitat is mixed dipterocarp forests from sea-level to 800 metres (2,600 ft) elevation.
