= Parinari argenteo-sericea =

Conservation status
- Vulnerable (IUCN 2.3)

Scientific classification
- Kingdom: Plantae
- Clade: Tracheophytes
- Clade: Angiosperms
- Clade: Eudicots
- Clade: Rosids
- Order: Malpighiales
- Family: Chrysobalanaceae
- Genus: Parinari
- Species: P. argenteo-sericea

Binomial name
- Parinari argenteo-sericea Kosterm.

Species of tree

Parinari argenteo-sericea is a tree of Borneo in the family Chrysobalanaceae. The specific epithet argenteo-sericea is from the Latin meaning "silvery silky", referring to the pubescence of the inflorescence and flowers.

== Description ==
Parinari argenteo-sericea grows as a tree up to 35 metres (110 ft) tall. The brown bark is lenticellate. The inflorescence is up to 15 cm (6 in) long. The ovoid fruits measure up to 8 cm (3 in) long.

== Distribution and habitat ==
Parinari argenteo-sericea is endemic to Borneo where it is confined to Sabah. Its habitat is lowland forests from sea-level to 100 metres (300 ft) elevation and forests along rivers and streams.
