= Parinari elmeri =

Conservation status
- Least Concern (IUCN 3.1)

Scientific classification
- Kingdom: Plantae
- Clade: Tracheophytes
- Clade: Angiosperms
- Clade: Eudicots
- Clade: Rosids
- Order: Malpighiales
- Family: Chrysobalanaceae
- Genus: Parinari
- Species: P. elmeri

Binomial name
- Parinari elmeri Merr.

Species of tree

Parinari elmeri is a tree in the family Chrysobalanaceae. It is named for the American botanist Adolph Elmer.

== Description ==
Parinari elmeri grows up to 30 metres (100 ft) tall. The mottled bark is pale cream or grey and white. The wood is used by the Iban people of Borneo in the construction of their longhouses. The flowers are white. The oblong-ellipsoid fruits measure up to 6.7 cm (3 in) long.

== Distribution and habitat ==
Parinari elmeri grows naturally in Peninsular Malaysia, Borneo and the Philippines. Its habitat is mixed dipterocarp forests from sea-level to 900 metres (3,000 ft) elevation.
