= Parinari metallica =

Conservation status
- Vulnerable (IUCN 3.1)

Scientific classification
- Kingdom: Plantae
- Clade: Tracheophytes
- Clade: Angiosperms
- Clade: Eudicots
- Clade: Rosids
- Order: Malpighiales
- Family: Chrysobalanaceae
- Genus: Parinari
- Species: P. metallica

Binomial name
- Parinari metallica Kosterm.

Species of tree

Parinari metallica is a tree in the family Chrysobalanaceae. The specific epithet metallica is from the Latin meaning "metallic', referring to the metallic sheen on the leaves when dried.

== Description ==
Parinari metallica grows up to 20 metres (70 ft) tall. Inflorescences measure from 4 centimetres (2 in) to 10 centimetres (4 in) long.

== Distribution and habitat ==
Parinari metallica is endemic to Borneo. Its habitat is mixed dipterocarp forests from sea-level to 300 metres (1,000 ft) elevation.
