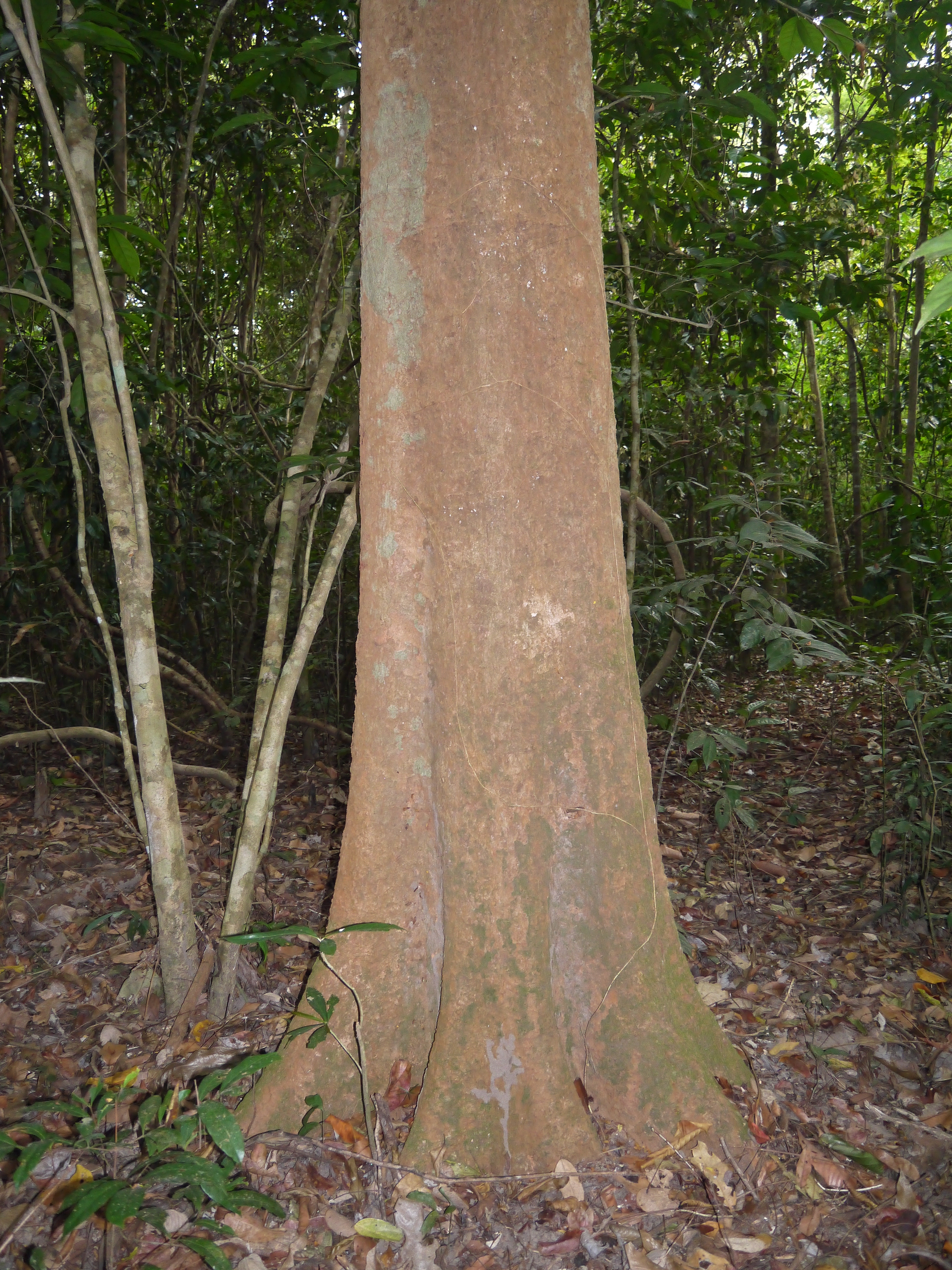
- Base of trunk of a specimen tree in Cat Tien National Park

Conservation status
- Least Concern (IUCN 3.1)

Scientific classification
- Kingdom: Plantae
- Clade: Tracheophytes
- Clade: Angiosperms
- Clade: Eudicots
- Clade: Rosids
- Order: Malpighiales
- Family: Chrysobalanaceae
- Genus: Parinari
- Species: P. anamensis

Binomial name
- Parinari anamensis Hance

Synonyms
- Parinari albida Craib

= Parinari anamensis =

Species of flowering plant

Parinari anamensis is a species of dicotyledonous flowering plant. It is a tree native to Cambodia, Laos, Thailand, and Vietnam, where it grows in lowland tropical moist forest. It is commonly known as Annamese burada. The Vietnamese name is cám. The Khmer name is thlok ធ្លក. A classical name for Cambodia is Nakorkuk Thlok ("the land of the thlok tree").

The trunk has a pinkish-brown hue with soft flaking bark (see illustration).

The species was described by Henry Fletcher Hance in 1877. It is currently placed in the family Chrysobalanaceae, (but formerly the Rosaceae). No subspecies are listed in the Catalogue of Life.
