= Parinari costata =

Conservation status
- Least Concern (IUCN 3.1)

Scientific classification
- Kingdom: Plantae
- Clade: Tracheophytes
- Clade: Angiosperms
- Clade: Eudicots
- Clade: Rosids
- Order: Malpighiales
- Family: Chrysobalanaceae
- Genus: Parinari
- Species: P. costata

Binomial name
- Parinari costata (Korth.) Blume

Subspecies
- Parinari costata subsp. costata; Parinari costata subsp. polyneura (Miq.) Prance; Parinari costata subsp. rubiginosa (Ridl.) Prance

Synonyms
- Ferolia costata (Korth.) O.Kuntze; Ferolia polyneura (Miq.) O.Kuntze; Lepidocarpa costata Korth.; Parinari bicolor Merr.; Parinari rubiginosa Ridl.; Parinarium costatum var. rubiginosum Ridl.; Parinarium helferi Hook.f.; Parinarium polyneurum Miq.

Species of flowering plant

Parinari costata is a species of flowering plant in the family Chrysobalanaceae. It is a tree native to Borneo, Sumatra, Peninsular Malaysia, Singapore, Myanmar, and the Philippines. It is 70 metres (230 ft) tall and 117 centimetres (46 in) wide. It stipules are 5 millimetres (0.20 in) in length while the flowers are circa 4 millimetres (0.16 in) in diameter with the fruits being circa 30 millimetres (1.2 in).

== Ecology ==
It grows on the elevation of 1.400 metres (4 ft 7.1 in) in swamps, sub-montane forests, and on hillsides and ridges.
