= Parinari oblongifolia =

Scientific classification
- Kingdom: Plantae
- Clade: Tracheophytes
- Clade: Angiosperms
- Clade: Eudicots
- Clade: Rosids
- Order: Malpighiales
- Family: Chrysobalanaceae
- Genus: Parinari
- Species: P. oblongifolia

Binomial name
- Parinari oblongifolia Hook.f.

Synonyms
- Ferolia oblongifolia (Hook.f.) Kuntze; Parinari borneensis Merr.; Parinari wallichiana R.Br. ex Hook.f.

Species of tree

Parinari oblongifolia is a tree in the family Chrysobalanaceae. The specific epithet oblongifolia is from the Latin meaning 'oblong-leafed'.

== Description ==
Parinari oblongifolia grows up to 40 metres (130 ft) tall. The smooth bark is grey to pale brown. The flowers are white to bluish. The ellipsoid fruits measure up to 9 cm (4 in) long.

== Distribution and habitat ==
Parinari oblongifolia grows naturally in Sumatra, Peninsular Malaysia and Borneo. Its habitat is lowland rainforest from sea-level to 450 metres (1,500 ft) altitude.
