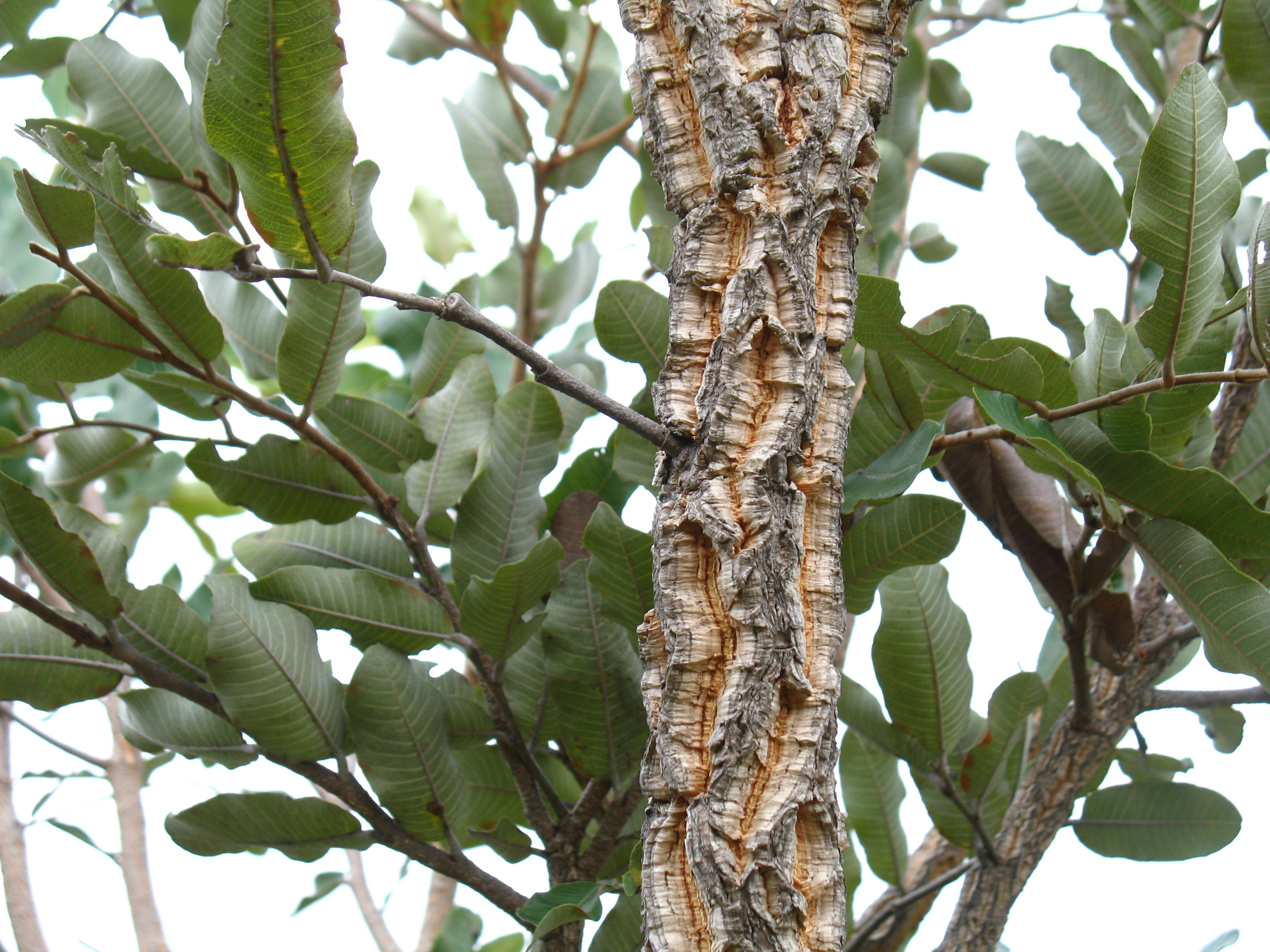
- Parinari curatellifolia

Scientific classification
- Kingdom: Plantae
- Clade: Tracheophytes
- Clade: Angiosperms
- Clade: Eudicots
- Clade: Rosids
- Order: Malpighiales
- Family: Chrysobalanaceae
- Genus: Parinari; Aubl.

Species
- See text

Synonyms
- Balantium Desv.; Dugortia Scop.; Ferolia Barrère ex Kuntze; Lepidocarpa Korth.; Parinarium Juss.; Petrocarya Schreb.

= Parinari =

Genus of flowering plants

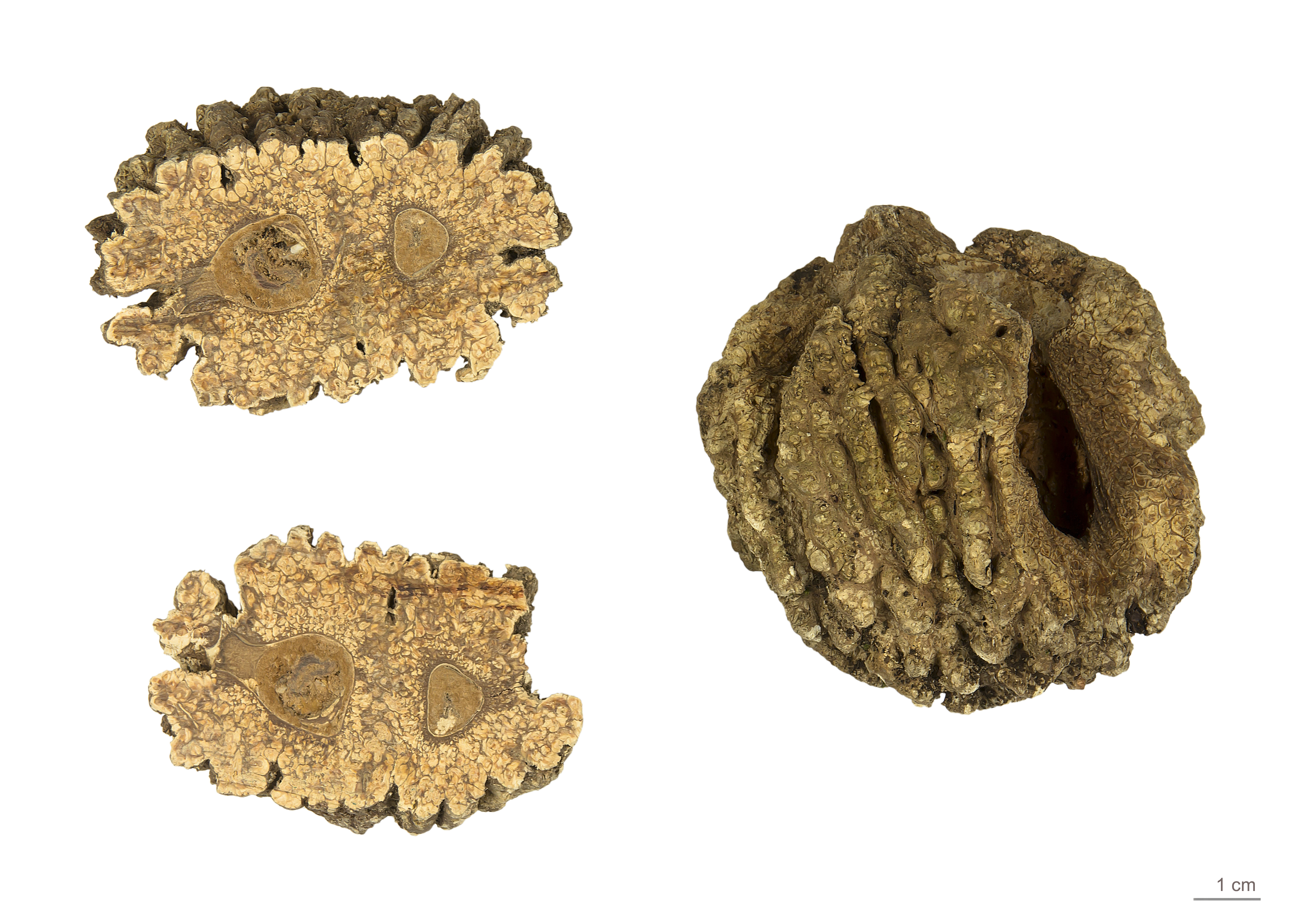
Parinari montana - MHNT

Parinari is a genus of plant in the family Chrysobalanaceae.

Species of genus Parinari are found in Subsaharan Africa from Senegal to Sudan and Kenya and south to Namibia and Natal; in Eastern Madagascar; from Indochina through Indonesia, New Guinea, northern Queensland, and the southwest Pacific; and in Central and South America from Costa Rica to Trinidad and southern Brazil. The oldest fossils of Parinari fruits are from the early Miocene of Ethiopia, Panama, and Colombia.

The genus is closely related to Neocarya.

Parinari can be distinguished from other genera in Chrysobalanaceae by the following characteristics:

- zygomorphic floral symmetry
- 6-10 unilaterally-attached stamens per flower
- ovary at side or mouth of receptacle-tube
- leaf lower surface lanate and with hair-filled stomatal cavities and parallel secondaries closely spaced
- pair of glands on leaf petiole
- large, woody fruits

== Species ==
As of May 2014 The Plant List recognises 42 accepted species (including infraspecific names):

- Parinari alvimii Prance
- Parinari anamensis Hance – Annamese burada
- Parinari argenteo-sericea Kosterm.
- Parinari brasiliensis (Schott) Hook.f.
- Parinari campestris Aubl.
- Parinari canarioides Kosterm.
- Parinari capensis Harv. – Dwarf mobola plum
- Parinari cardiophylla Ducke
- Parinari chocoensis Prance
- Parinari congensis Didr.
- Parinari congolana T.Durand & H.Durand
- Parinari costata (Korth.) Blume
  - subsp. polyneura (Miq.) Prance
  - subsp. rubiginosa (Ridl.) Prance
- Parinari curatellifolia Planch. ex Benth. – Mobola plum
- Parinari elmeri Merr.
- Parinari excelsa Sabine – Guinea plum
- Parinari gigantea Kosterm.
- Parinari hypochrysea Mildbr. ex Letouzey & F.White
- Parinari insularum A.Gray
- Parinari klugii Prance
- Parinari leontopitheci Prance
- Parinari littoralis Prance
- Parinari maguirei Prance
- Parinari metallica Kosterm.
- Parinari montana Aubl.
- Parinari nonda F.Muell. ex Benth. – Nonda plum
- Parinari oblongifolia Hook.f.
- Parinari obtusifolia Hook.f.
- Parinari occidentalis Prance
- Parinari pachyphylla Rusby
- Parinari panamensis Jud, Nelson & Herrera
- Parinari papuana C.T.White
  - subsp. salomonensis (C.T.White) Prance
- Parinari parilis J.F.Macbr.
- Parinari parva Kosterm.
- Parinari parvifolia Sandwith
- Parinari prancei Kosterm.
- Parinari rigida Kosterm.
- Parinari rodolphii Huber
- Parinari romeroi Prance
- Parinari sprucei Hook.f.
- Parinari sumatrana (Jack) Benth.
