= Parinari occidentalis =

Conservation status
- Least Concern (IUCN 3.1)

Scientific classification
- Kingdom: Plantae
- Clade: Tracheophytes
- Clade: Angiosperms
- Clade: Eudicots
- Clade: Rosids
- Order: Malpighiales
- Family: Chrysobalanaceae
- Genus: Parinari
- Species: P. occidentalis

Binomial name
- Parinari occidentalis Prance

Species of tree

Parinari occidentalis is a species of tree in the family Chrysobalanaceae. It is native to the Amazon Basin of northern Brazil, Colombia, Peru, and Bolivia in tropical South America.
