= Richmond, Queensland =

Richmond
- Town
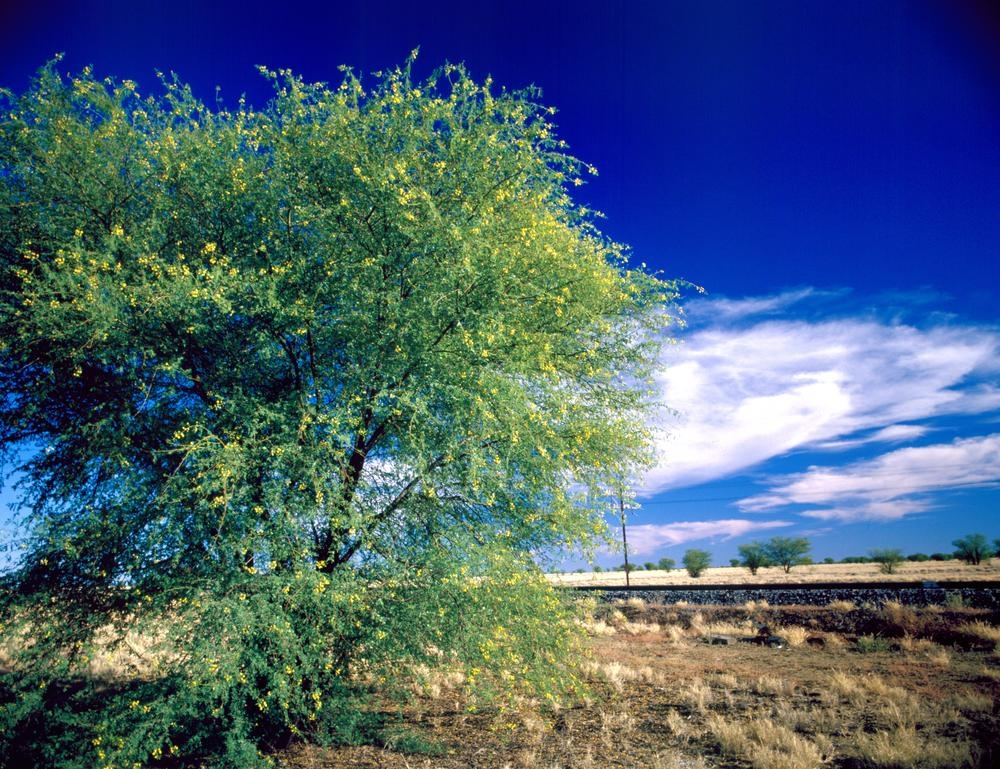
- Great Northern railway line near Richmond, 1985

- Interactive map of Richmond
- Coordinates: 20.7305°S 143.1425°E
- Country: Australia
- State: Queensland
- LGA: Shire of Richmond
- Location: 115 km (71 mi) W of Hughenden; 406 km (252 mi) E of Mount Isa; 498 km (309 mi) WSW of Townsville; 1,588 km (987 mi) NW of Brisbane

Government
  - State electorate: Traeger
  - Federal division: Kennedy

Area
  - Total: 3,357.9 km^{2} (1,296.5 sq mi)

Population
  - Total: 578 (2021 census)
  - Density: 0.17213/km^{2} (0.4458/sq mi)
- Time zone: UTC+10:00 (AEST)
- Postcode: 4822
Localities around Richmond
Burleigh	Woolgar	Dutton River
Maxwelton	Richmond	Marathon
Albion	Albion	Stamford

Richmond is a rural town and locality in the Shire of Richmond, Queensland, Australia. It is the administrative centre of the Shire of Richmond. In the 2021 census, the locality of Richmond had a population of 578 people.

== Toponymy ==
The origin of the name Richmond comes from when Arthur Bundock and Walter Hayes took up land in the district which they named the Richmond Downs Pastoral Run. It was named after the Richmond River in northern New South Wales which was where Bundock had been born.

== Geography ==
The town is 498 kilometres (309 mi) west of Townsville and 406 kilometres (252 mi) east of Mount Isa. The Flinders Highway traverses the locality from east to west passing through the town which is located in about the centre of the locality. The Great Northern railway runs immediately south and parallel to the highway through the east of the locality, crossing over in the town which is served by the Richmond railway station, and then the railway runs immediately north and parallel to the highway through the west of the locality. There is a second railway station, the Moselle railway on the far eastern edge of the locality, named after the pastoral run, which in turn was named in about the 1870s by pastoralist J.B. Brodie after the Moselle River in eastern France.

The Flinders River flows through the locality from east to west, passing to the west of the town, where the river has its confluence with its tributary Dutton River.

The Richmond–Croydon Road exits to the north-west, and the Richmond–Winton Road to the south-west.

== Climate ==
Richmond has a hot semi-arid climate bordering on a tropical temperature regime.

Climate data for Richmond Post Office (211 m asl), 1991–2020 normals; extremes 1893–2020
Month	Jan	Feb	Mar	Apr	May	Jun	Jul	Aug	Sep	Oct	Nov	Dec	Year
Record high °C (°F)	46.0 (114.8)	44.0 (111.2)	42.4 (108.3)	40.6 (105.1)	37.8 (100.0)	34.5 (94.1)	36.1 (97.0)	37.3 (99.1)	40.3 (104.5)	43.3 (109.9)	45.5 (113.9)	45.6 (114.1)	46.0 (114.8)
Mean daily maximum °C (°F)	36.9 (98.4)	36.0 (96.8)	35.3 (95.5)	33.3 (91.9)	29.7 (85.5)	26.8 (80.2)	26.8 (80.2)	28.8 (83.8)	33.0 (91.4)	36.2 (97.2)	37.7 (99.9)	38.1 (100.6)	33.2 (91.8)
Mean daily minimum °C (°F)	24.0 (75.2)	23.3 (73.9)	21.5 (70.7)	18.1 (64.6)	14.2 (57.6)	10.8 (51.4)	9.9 (49.8)	10.9 (51.6)	15.3 (59.5)	19.4 (66.9)	22.2 (72.0)	23.6 (74.5)	17.8 (64.0)
Record low °C (°F)	13.3 (55.9)	12.5 (54.5)	10.6 (51.1)	3.6 (38.5)	1.1 (34.0)	−2.4 (27.7)	−2.2 (28.0)	−1.1 (30.0)	2.2 (36.0)	4.4 (39.9)	7.3 (45.1)	10.2 (50.4)	−2.4 (27.7)
Average precipitation mm (inches)	133.0 (5.24)	115.3 (4.54)	65.2 (2.57)	21.4 (0.84)	8.1 (0.32)	13.7 (0.54)	10.8 (0.43)	6.0 (0.24)	5.1 (0.20)	13.7 (0.54)	35.1 (1.38)	72.0 (2.83)	499.6 (19.67)
Average precipitation days	9.4	8.9	5.2	2.1	1.5	1.3	1.2	1.1	1.1	2.5	4.9	6.6	45.8
Average afternoon relative humidity (%)	38	41	33	30	31	31	28	23	20	21	25	29	29
Source: Bureau of Meteorology

== History ==
Jirandali (also known as Yirandali, Warungu, and Yirandhali) is an Australian Aboriginal language of North-West Queensland, particularly the Hughenden area. The language region includes the local government area of the Shire of Flinders, including Dutton River, Flinders River, Mount Sturgeon, Caledonia, Richmond, Corfield, Winton, Torrens, Tower Hill, Landsborough Creek, Lammermoor Station, Hughenden, and Tangorin.

Wanamarra (also known as Maykulan and Wunumura is an Australian Aboriginal language in North West Queensland. The language region includes areas within the Shire of McKinlay, Shire of Cloncurry and Shire of Richmond, including the Flinders River area, and the towns of Kynuna and Richmond.

The explorer William Landsborough camped on 13 March 1862 at the site that would become the town of Richmond. Explorer and former Commandant of the Native Police, Frederick Walker, had previously passed through the area in October 1861, naming and camping on the Dutton River. Both the Landsborough and Walker parties were attempting to locate the Burke and Wills expedition.

The leasehold of the Richmond Downs Pastoral Run was granted in 1863 to Wellington Cochrane Bundock and Enoch Price Walter Hays who came from the Richmond River in New South Wales. In 1866 the Crown Lands Office transferred the leasehold on the Pastoral Runs of Wyanganie, Landsborough Downs and Richmond Downs in the Burke district from W C Bundock and F S Hays to Robert Napier, manager of the Commercial Banking Company of Sydney. Then in 1867 the interest of the bank in these three properties was transferred back to W C Bundock and Francis S Hays.

By 1867, Richmond Downs had a postal service. However at some stage the service drew the attention of the Postmaster General for inefficiency. In the 1870s services became intermittent. In May 1899, the post office name was changed from Richmond Downs to Richmond, and a new post office built.

In 1880, gold was found at Woolgar to the north and Richmond became an important stagecoach stop en route to Woolgar.

The town was surveyed on 9 December 1882 by surveyor Joseph Hargreaves with town lots sold from April 1883.

Richmond Provisional School opened on 22 May 1889 with 23 pupils, becoming Richmond State School on 27 February 1902 when it had 113 pupils.

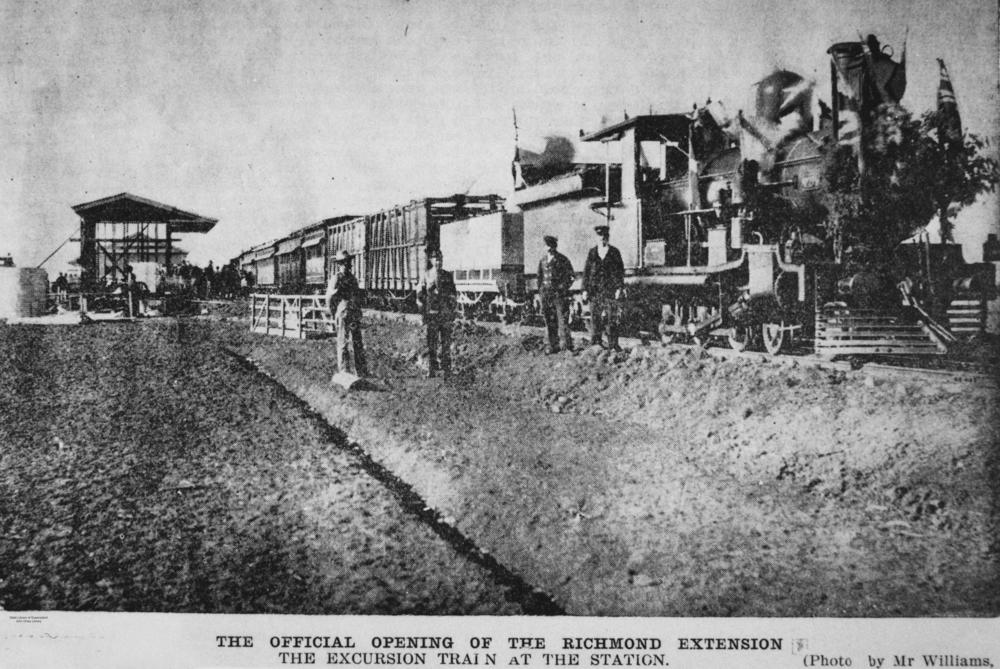
Official opening of the railway line to Richmond, 1904

The Great Northern railway reached the town in June 1904. At the official celebration on 2 June 1904, it was explained that the line was the first to be built by cheaper methods by replacing the track ballast with packed earth, but the cost saving was at the expense of train speed, which was expected to be 15 miles per hour. It was hoped that cheaper methods would allow more pastoral areas to be serviced by rail with an immediate desire to connect through to Cloncurry.

On Sunday 24 July 1904, St Brigid's Catholic Church was blessed and opened by Bishop Joseph Higgins.

In July 1909, St John the Baptist Anglican Church was officially opened and dedicated by Bishop George Frodsham.

The Sisters of St Joseph of the Sacred Heart opened a Catholic primary school in 1915.

The Richmond Public Library was opened in 1996.

== Demographics ==
In the 2006 census, the town of Richmond had a population of 554 people.

In the 2011 census, the locality of Richmond had a population of 522 people.

In the 2016 census, the locality of Richmond had a population of 648 people.

In the 2021 census, the locality of Richmond had a population of 578 people.

== Heritage listings ==
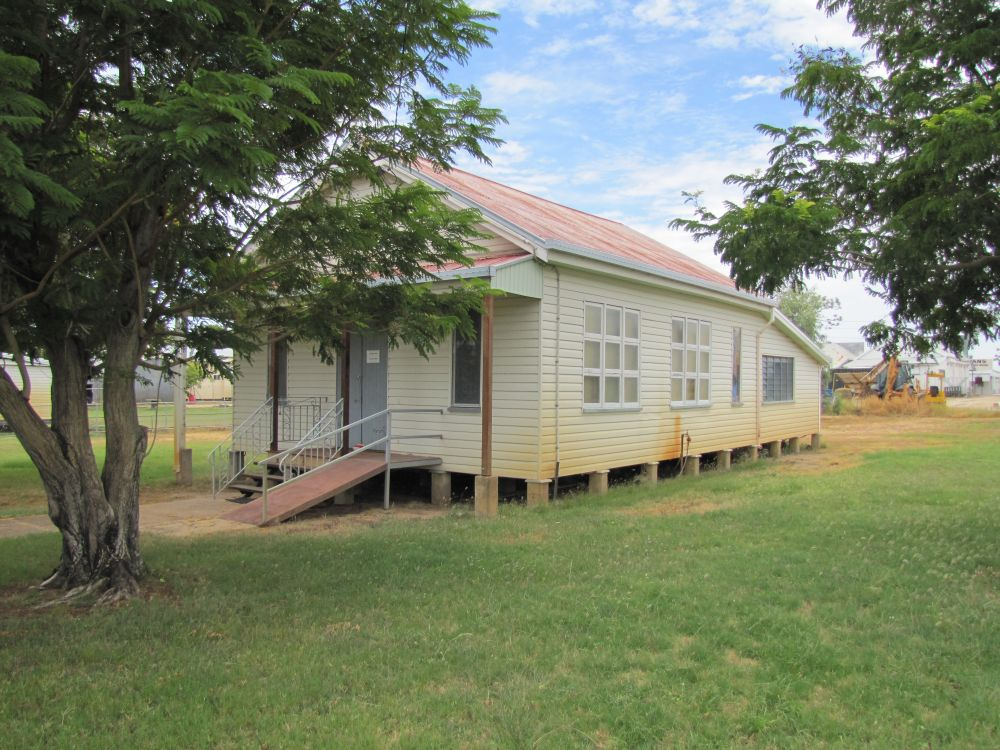
St John the Baptist Anglican Church, Richmond, 2014

Richmond has a number of heritage-listed sites, including:

- St John the Baptist Anglican Church, 55 Crawford Street (20.7301°S 143.1410°E)

== Economy ==
Traditionally, the two biggest industries in Richmond are sheep- and cattle-farming, however tourism is an increasingly important aspect of the local economy. In addition to being a major transit stop on the Flinders Highway, recent paleontological discoveries have unearthed the fossils of prehistoric marine creatures, some of which are on display in Richmond.

== Education ==
Richmond State School is a government primary and secondary (Prep–10) school for boys and girls at 88 Crawford Street (20.7341°S 143.1430°E). In 2016, the school had an enrolment of 78 students with 10 teachers and 12 non-teaching staff (7 full-time equivalent). In 2018, the school had an enrolment of 84 students with 12 teachers and 13 non-teaching staff (8 full-time equivalent).

There is are no school in Richmond providing education to Year 12; the nearest such school is Hughenden State School in Hughenden to the east. However, given the distances involved, the alternatives are distance education and boarding schools.

== Attractions ==
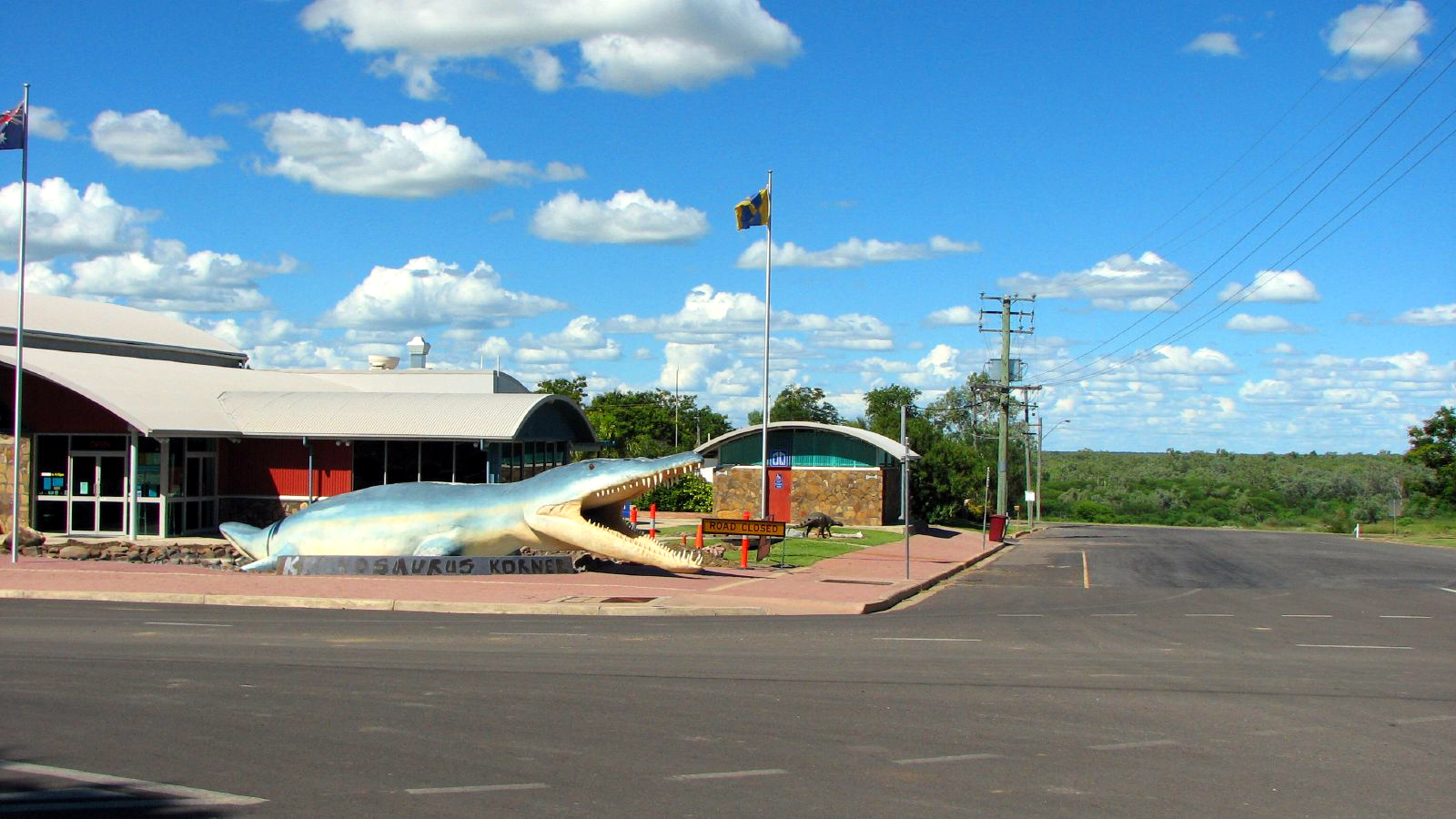
- Kronosaurus Korner, Richmond, Queensland. Dinosaur Museum. 2009
  Cambridge Downs Heritage Display Centre – a replica of the original Cambridge Downs Homestead built in the late 1860s.
- Kronosaurus Korner – fossil museum.
- Lake Fred Tritton
- Richmond War Memorial
- Moon Rocks Monument

== Facilities ==
Richmond has a golf course, bowling club, swimming facilities, race course, caravan park and a tourist information centre.

The Richmond Shire Council operates a public library in Richmond at 76 Goldring Street.

The Richmond branch of the Queensland Country Women's Association has its rooms at 74 Goldring Street.

== Transport ==
- See Richmond Airport

Preceding station	Queensland Rail	Following station
Long distance rail services
Hughenden towards Townsville	The Inlander	Julia Creek towards Mount Isa
