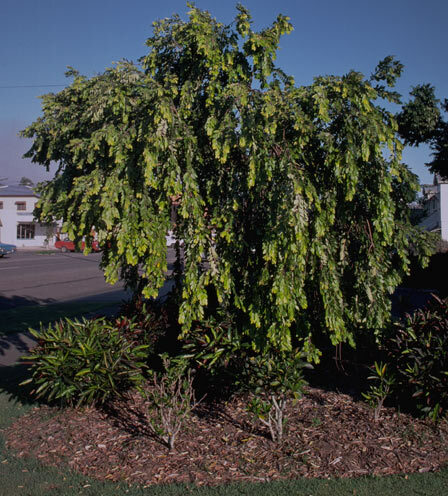
- Full tree
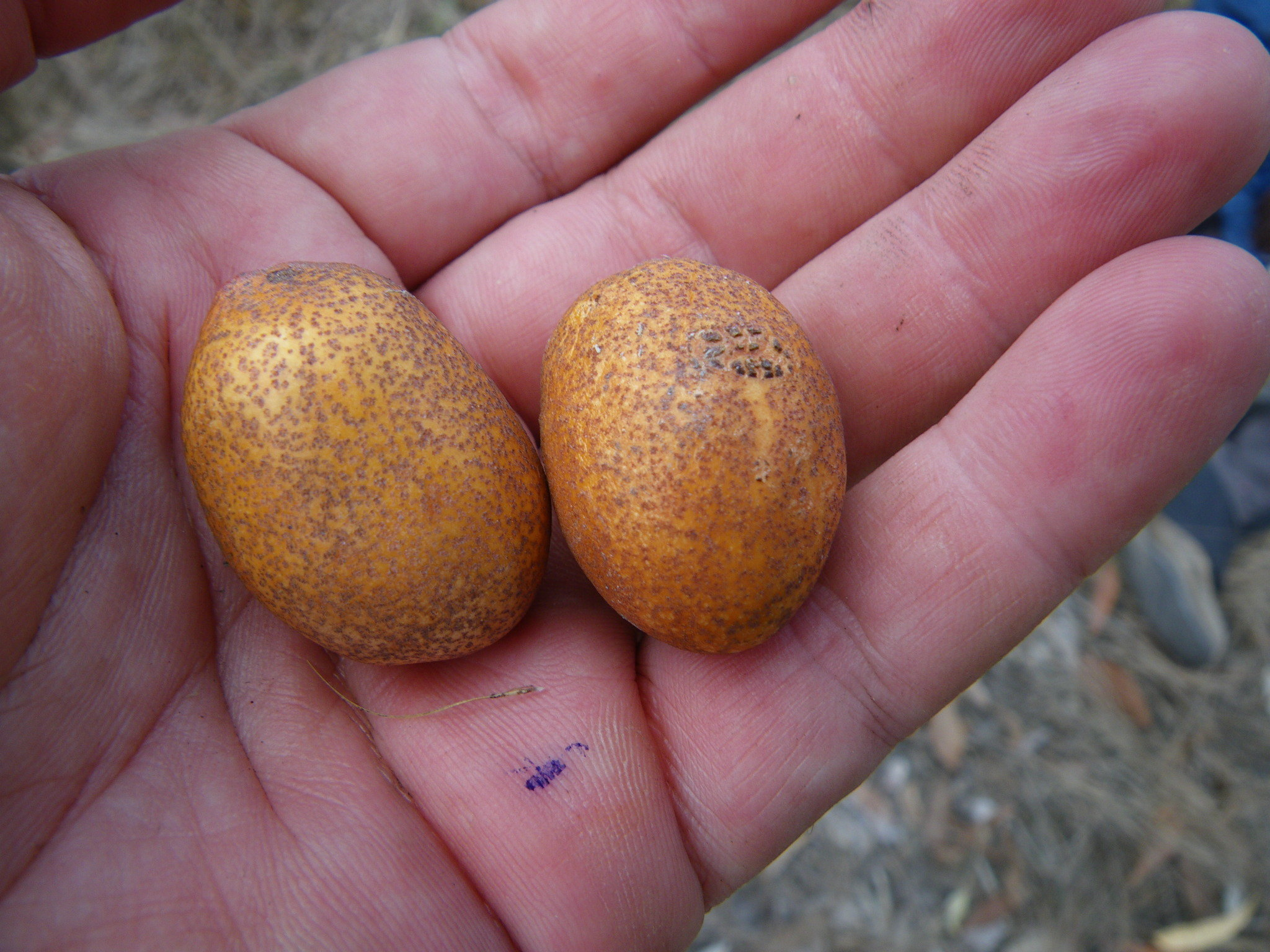
- Fruit

Conservation status
- Least Concern (IUCN 3.1)

Scientific classification
- Kingdom: Plantae
- Clade: Tracheophytes
- Clade: Angiosperms
- Clade: Eudicots
- Clade: Rosids
- Order: Malpighiales
- Family: Chrysobalanaceae
- Genus: Parinari
- Species: P. nonda

Binomial name
- Parinari nonda F.Muell. ex Benth.

Synonyms
- Ferolia nonda (F.Muell. ex Benth.) Kuntze

= Parinari nonda =

Species of shrub

Parinari nonda is a shrub or small tree in the family Chrysobalanaceae. It occurs in northern Australia and New Guinea. The edible fruits are harvested in the wild. Common names include nonda plum, nonda tree, nunda plum and parinari.
