= Shire of Richmond =

Coordinates: 20°43′S 143°08′E

- Local government area
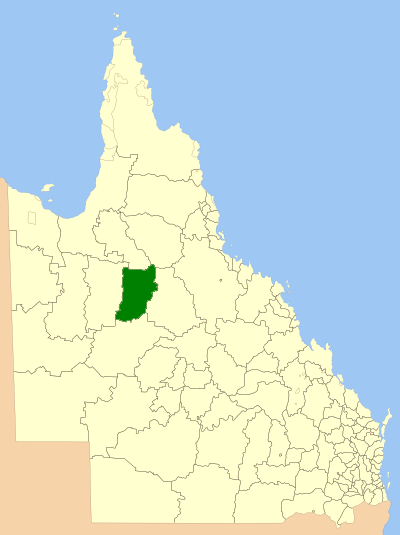
- Location within Queensland

- Interactive map of Shire of Richmond
- Country: Australia
- State: Queensland
- Region: North West Queensland
- Established: 1916
- Council seat: Richmond

Government
  - Mayor: John Wharton
  - State electorate: Traeger
  - Federal division: Kennedy

Area
  - Total: 26,581 km^{2} (10,263 sq mi)

Population
  - Total: 761 (2021 census)
  - Density: 0.028629/km^{2} (0.07415/sq mi)
- Website: Shire of Richmond
LGAs around Shire of Richmond
McKinlay	Croydon	Etheridge
McKinlay	Shire of Richmond	Flinders
Winton	Winton	Winton

The Shire of Richmond is a local government area in north western Queensland, Australia.

It covers an area of 26,581 square kilometres (10,263.0 sq mi), and has existed as a local government entity since 1916. It is part of the Gulf Country.

In the 2021 census, the Shire of Richmond had a population of 761 people.

== History ==
Wanamarra (also known as Maykulan and Wunumura is an Australian Aboriginal language in North West Queensland. The language region includes areas within the Shire of McKinlay, Shire of Cloncurry and Shire of Richmond, including the Flinders River area, and the towns of Kynuna and Richmond.

The Shire of Wyangarie, named for a prominent grazing homestead in the area, was created on 1 January 1916 out of part of the Shire of Flinders under the Local Authorities Act 1902. On 24 July 1930, it lost part of its area to Shire of McKinlay. On 31 July 1954, it was renamed Richmond.

== Towns and localities ==
The Shire of Richmond includes the following settlements:

- Richmond
- Albion
- Burleigh
- Cambridge
- Maxwelton
- Nonda
- Saxby
- Woolgar

== Amenities ==
The Richmond Shire Council operate several services in the town including:

- Richmond Public Library
- Richmond Public Gym
- Richmond Childcare Centre
- Richmond After School Care
- Richmond Swimming Pool
- Richmond Caravan Park

== Chairmen and Mayors ==
- 1927: Campbell Robert Murray
- 1997–present: John McArthur Wharton AM

== Election results ==
=== 2024 ===
2024 Queensland local elections: Richmond
Party	Candidate	Votes	%	±%
Independent	Nick Buick	253	11.05	
Independent	Judy Brown	281	12.27	
Independent	Clay Kennedy	170	7.42	
Independent	Will Guy	197	8.60	
Independent	Terry Flute	372	16.24	
Independent	Megan Easton	277	12.10	
Independent	Sherreen Johnston	347	15.15	
Independent	Patsy-Ann Fox	393	17.16	
Turnout		2,290		

== Demographics ==
Year	Population	Notes
1933	1,776	
1947	1,478	
1954	1,586	
1961	2,214	
1966	1,828	
1971	1,409	
1976	1,442	
1981	1,383	
1986	1,198	
1991	1,108	
1996	1,179	
2001 census	1,020	
2006 census	902	
2011 census	827	
2016 census	791	
2021 census	761	
