= Cairns Plywood Pty Ltd Sawmill Complex =

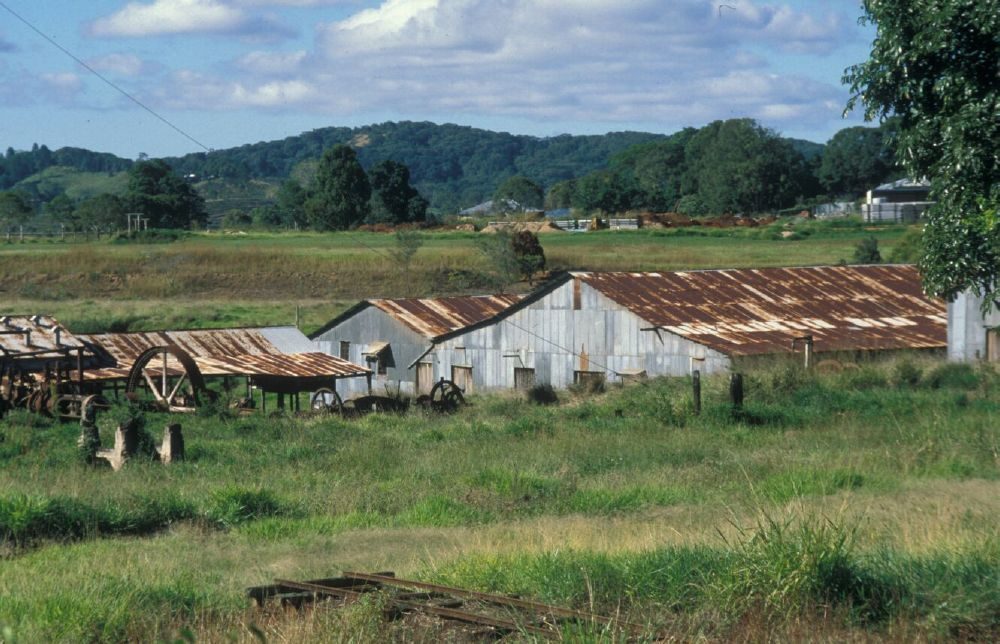
- Butter box factory at Cairns Plywood sawmill

- Location within Queensland Location within Australia
- 17.2693°S 145.585°E
- Location: 25–33 Eacham Road, Yungaburra, Tablelands Region, Queensland, Australia

History
- Design period: 1900–1914 (early 20th century)
- Built: 1910–1980s

Queensland Heritage Register
- Official name: Cairns Plywood Pty Ltd Sawmill Complex, Cairns Plywood Limited, Eacham Sawmills, Williamson Brothers Sawmill
- Type: state heritage (built, archaeological)
- Designated: 21 October 1992
- Reference no.: 600481
- Significant period: 1910–1980s (fabric); 1910–c. 1988 (historical use)
- Significant components: shed/s, crane / gantry, objects (movable) – forestry/timber industry, tramway, machinery/plant/equipment – forestry/timber industry, mounting block/stand, veneer mill, drying shed, kiln, butter box factory, office/administration building, slab/s – concrete, moulding shed, furniture/fittings, chimney/chimney stack, forge/blacksmithy, workshop, railway

Cairns Plywood Pty Ltd Sawmill Complex is a heritage-listed sawmill at 25–33 Eacham Road, Yungaburra, Tablelands Region, Queensland, Australia. It was built from 1910 to the 1980s. It is also known as Cairns Plywood Limited, Eacham Sawmills, and Williamson Brothers Sawmill. It was added to the Queensland Heritage Register on 21 October 1992.

== History ==
The Williamson Brothers constructed the sawmill in 1910 when the railway reached Yungaburra, providing ready transport to Cairns for local timber. It was operating as Eacham Sawmills in 1918 and is believed to have been owned by George Gummow, Jimmy Brett and Jules Moxham during the 1930s, who named the mill Cairns Plywood Pty. Ltd in 1940. The Rankines bought the mill in 1963. At the time of World Heritage listing of the Wet Tropics of Queensland in 1988 the Rankine family-owned mills at Peeramon, Kairi, Stratford, Mareeba, Innisfail and Ingham. All of these operations closed as a result of the World Heritage listing.

The Atherton Tablelands originally had extensive rainforest cover. Although this eventually proved to contain over 100 species of tree useful to Europeans, including high quality furniture timbers, transporting timber over the range to the coast was difficult. In the early years cedar getters cut and sawed timber by hand and transported it by bullock or horse teams; attempts to float it down the Barron River having proved wasteful failures. Many of the trees felled to provide cleared land for closer settlement were burned as they lay.

Yungaburra was surveyed in 1888 under the Village Settlement scheme and was called Allumbah Pocket. This scheme was introduced in 1885 and offered settlers farm blocks with home sites clustered as a village. Around this time the Tablelands railway from the port of Cairns to the Tableland was begun, although it took far longer to reach its objective than originally envisaged, due largely to the difficult terrain. The first farms at Allumbah were taken up in 1891, though the village scheme proved unsuccessful. The railway reached Mareeba in 1895 and a sawmill was set up at Ravenshoe cutting cedar and pine in 1897. The arrival of the railway meant that large scale processing of timber at sawmills was practical and profitable. The line arrived at Atherton in 1903, greatly improving access to the area, and another sawmill was set up there. It supplied timber for mines in the area and later for building to support farming expansion. Timber was also exported and fine furniture varieties supplied from the Tablelands included cedar, maple, pines, walnut, penda, bean, ash and oak. Sawmilling became a part of every town on the Tablelands.

Following new Land Acts in the early 1900s more people took up land around Allumbah and a small service town developed to serve them. In 1910, the railway line linking Cairns with the Tablelands reached Allumbah Pocket, which was then renamed Yungaburra to avoid confusion with another town. The Post Office Directory for this year lists almost all occupants of Yungaburra as "selectors." A period of rapid development then began with the construction of a sawmill, a hotel and a number of shops and houses near the new Yungaburra railway station. In 1911, Eacham Shire was formed.

Albert and Frederick Williamson established the sawmill close to the new railway station in 1911. The sawmill not only used the railway line to transport timber, but also provided timber for further railway construction.

In 1926, the Gillies Highway between Yungaburra and Gordonvale was opened, providing the first trafficable road to the Tablelands. Yungaburra became a gateway to the natural attractions of the area and a blossoming tourist trade to the nearby lakes created a second period of development. Improved roads led to the last of the bullock and horse teams in the timber industry being replaced by trucks and machinery. In 1933 George Gummow, who owned the mill at the time, installed a large Capital Lathe from the US for veneer peeling and the business became Cairns Plywood Limited in 1940, manufacturing veneers and plywood following the increase in interest in veneer in the 1930s.

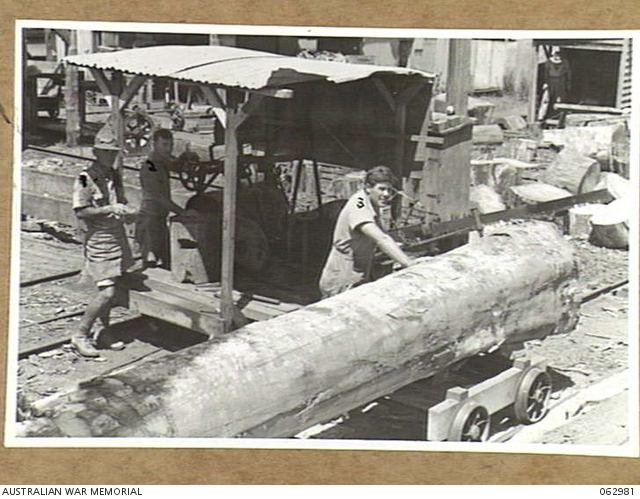
Members of the 17th Battalion, Volunteer Defence Corps, at their civilian occupation working a drag saw, 1944

Butter production was an important industry on the Atherton Tablelands from 1913 to 1951. The Butter Box Factory was used to produce timber boxes for the Malanda Butter Factory, which later became the Malanda Milk Company, attributed with "the longest milk run in the world", from Malanda to Darwin, which eventually became part of Dairy Farmers Group. The butter box factory ceased producing butter boxes after the Rankine's, who purchased the mill in 1963, found the machinery was so out of alignment they could not make money on butter box production. The Rankine's also ceased operating the borax plant, which involved dipping timbers into borax as treatment against borers.

The railway branch line to Yungaburra, Malanda and Tarzali closed in 1963, ending the rail link between the sawmill and Cairns.

The main operation of the mill under ownership of the Rankine brothers was the peeling of veneers. The Rankine's transported the cut veneers to their drying sheds at Peeramon by truck. The mill continued to produce timber stock for sale. The Rankine brothers took over Foxwood Industries in 1986, acquiring mills at Ingham, Innisfail and Mareeba. In 1989, this company was said to be the largest timber business in Queensland. The mill closed when World Heritage listing of the Wet Tropics Rainforest of North Queensland in 1988 prevented further milling of rainforest timber. The sawmill burned down in the late 1980s.

== Description ==
The Cairns Plywood Sawmill Pty Ltd occupies a large site on Eacham Road. Concrete footings, a steel chimney, two boilers, a steam generator and a steam engine mark the original location of the sawmill. There are a number of corrugated iron gable roofed structures, sheds and various items of machinery scattered across a large site.

The Office is situated on the fence line fronting Eacham Road. It is a single-storeyed structure said to be made of silky oak timber, but has been painted inside and out. It has an exposed frame and is set on low steel posts. The building has a hipped roof clad with corrugated iron that extends into an awning at the front, which is supported on plain timber posts. There is an extension to one side and the building has both casement and sash windows with battened window hoods. The interior has offices opening off a central hall and has timber walls, ceiling and floor. A large sales counter sits in the front room, which has three quarter height partition walls clad in tongue and groove boards with some weatherboard cladding. Few interior fittings are present, these include two fixed safes and some shelves and drawers.

The Moulding Shed and Borax Plant extends well into the road reserve area beside the modern bitumen road at the front of the complex. The Moulding Shed has a frame of timber poles and has a gabled roof clad with corrugated iron. It includes storage and loading areas and has a tiny office in one corner. Two kilns with tongue and groove lining with steam pipes set into the ceiling and small covered chimneys are in the Moulding Shed. The Borax Plant is a large steel-framed and steel sided box with vertically sliding doors at each end adjacent to the Moulding Shed. It has a series of large pipes at points around the structure and a large borax tank on the top. There are the remains of rails in the floor and narrow gauge rails which lead from this building once led through the gate and under the road to the railway station. The railway has gone but small sections of the line remain and a few timber sleepers can be seen in the tunnel. 3. The Switching Shed is beside the pathway leading to the sheds and veneer mill from the Office. It is a small square timber building set on a concrete slab and has a skillion roof.

The Mill Site is represented by the remains of boilers and other machinery, concrete mounting blocks, belt wheels and stacks of corrugated iron sheeting. There are traces of rail embedded in the grass. A feature of the sawmill site that can be seen for some distance away is a metal chimney belonging to the boiler and machinery that once ran the sawmill. For safety reasons, steel cables currently brace this chimney. Industrial equipment immediately adjacent to the chimney consists of the main boiler, secondary boiler, steam engine and steam generator interconnected by a series of cast-iron pipes. Concrete pads represent the previous location of other industrial equipment.

The Former Workshop is a rectangular timber and weatherboard building with a gabled roof clad in corrugated iron. It has a timber parapet an awning and a double door on the west side. There are open skillion verandahs on the west and north side of the building and a corrugated iron clad skillion section on the rear, or east side. The machinery housed in the workshop were operated by a set of interconnected flat belts running to a single electric engine and drive shaft which is still present. Machinery includes a drill press, mechanical hacksaw, set of grinding wheels, a hydraulic press, a large bandsaw, a large metal lathe, a small lathe and a fan set to the forge in the blacksmiths room at the rear of the building. A short chimney protrudes through the roof above the blacksmiths forge. Tools such as spanners, and equipment including scrap iron, an old welder and welding masks remain in situ on the workbench. Other industrial equipment includes cogs, bolts, scrap metal, tin, chains, belt repair hooks and belt pieces. A large jack supports the centre of the skillion roof on the north side.

The Former Plywood Mill is a large corrugated iron clad timber-framed building with two parallel sections with gabled roofs. Essentially the building is an open plan shed with some internal subdivision including an internal mezzanine section with a large tub with two small plywood partitions, one forming an office area. Three sets of railway lines cross the shed floor and exit through large sliding doors on the west side of the building. A drying kiln, lined with tongue and groove boards is at the northern end of the shed. Various pieces of machinery including generator sets, rollers, presses, saw tables, saw blades and rail carts are stored here.

The Veneer Mill is a very large rectangular timber structure with a gabled, steel clad roof. It has a raised concrete floor. Some posts supporting the roof are very large timber logs. There are two steel gantries spanning the building. Some machinery is still in place.

The Butter Box Factory is a timber-framed building with a corrugated iron roof and corrugated iron and timber walls. There are two enclosures within the factory, one a tongue and groove partition with a bench and shelves at the north-east section of the building, the other a small plywood office in the south-east corner. Machinery used for box production is in situ including a series of four multiple saw tables, separate rip saw, brand stamping machine and guillotine. A winch and drive shaft is also present, but removed from its original location. Spare, excess and disused equipment is currently stored in this factory.

The Drying Kilns is a timber-framed building with a corrugated iron roof and timber block footings. The kilns are two tongue and groove timber lined rooms comprising the inside of the building while three open sided verandahs form the outside. Above the ceiling of each drying chamber is a lined enclosed space which contains a series of parallel steam/hot water pipes feeding into a main pipe that leads towards the main steam boiler. Sections of the internal railway and timber carts used on the internal railway are stored under one verandah of the Drying Kilns.

Remnants of the Internal Tramway are discernable across the site.

== Heritage listing ==
Cairns Plywood Pty Ltd Sawmill Complex was listed on the Queensland Heritage Register on 21 October 1992 having satisfied the following criteria.

The place is important in demonstrating the evolution or pattern of Queensland's history.

The Cairns Plywood Timber Mill is important in demonstrating the development and decline of the timber industry in Far North Queensland. It functioned as a timber mill from the 1910s until World Heritage listing of the Wet Tropics rainforest in 1988 during which time it functioned as an economic drive for the town and immediate district. The timber industry is one of the major industrial themes in the development of Queensland.

The place demonstrates rare, uncommon or endangered aspects of Queensland's cultural heritage.

The Former Workshop, Drying Shed, Moulding Shed, Sawmill site, Office, Veneer Mill, Former Plywood Sheds, Switching Shed, Butter Box Factory and remnants of the internal tramway demonstrate a rare combination of all elements of a saw milling operation including the steam and electric saw mill equipment which formed at least two generations of milling. A rare set of butter box making machinery remains intact and demonstrates a dedicated technology which links the dairy and timber industries, two significant industries on the Atherton Tablelands.

The place is important because of its aesthetic significance.

There is aesthetic value in the industrial nature of the chimney, industrial equipment and work sheds and their locations across the site. The Office displays attractive characteristics of early 1900s timber architecture including exposed framing and internal timber archways while the former Workshop contains architectural detailing such as a distinctive timber parapet on the facade.

The place has a strong or special association with a particular community or cultural group for social, cultural or spiritual reasons.

The place has a high level of social significance for Yungaburra residents, as the Cairns Plywood Timber Mill was the main employer in Yungaburra during its operation. The Cairns Plywood Timber Mill has a special association with timber cutters from 1910 to the 1980s.
