= Shire of Eacham =

Coordinates: 17°21′13″S 145°35′37″E

- Local government area
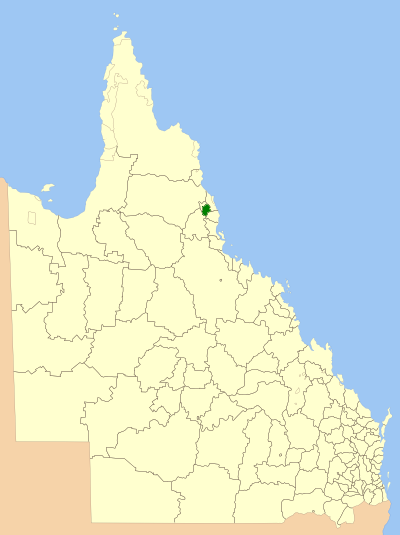
- Location within Queensland

- Country: Australia
- State: Queensland
- Region: Far North Queensland
- Established: 1910
- Council seat: Malanda

Area
  - Total: 1,126.4 km^{2} (434.9 sq mi)

Population
  - Total: 6,359 (2006 census)
  - Density: 5.6454/km^{2} (14.6216/sq mi)
LGAs around Shire of Eacham
Atherton	Cairns	Cairns
Atherton	Shire of Eacham	Cairns
Herberton	Johnstone	Johnstone

The Shire of Eacham was a local government area of Queensland. It was located on the Atherton Tableland, a plateau forming part of the Great Dividing Range west of the city of Cairns. The shire, administered from the town of Malanda, covered an area of 1,126.4 square kilometres (434.9 sq mi), and existed as a local government entity from 1910 until 2008, when it amalgamated with several other councils in the Tableland area to become the Tablelands Region.

Despite its tropical latitude, the high altitude on the tableland allows a dairy industry to operate.

== History ==
On 22 Nov 1910 the area around Lake Eacham was incorporated as the Shire of Eacham, taking in part of each of the Shires of Tinaroo, Johnstone and Cairns.

Its first meeting was held at Yungaburra's community hall on 22 February 1911. In April 1912, a site for a shire hall was reserved in Malanda. On 12 April 1913, the shire relocated its offices to Malanda. However, the planned council chambers did not open until 22 Feb 1939.

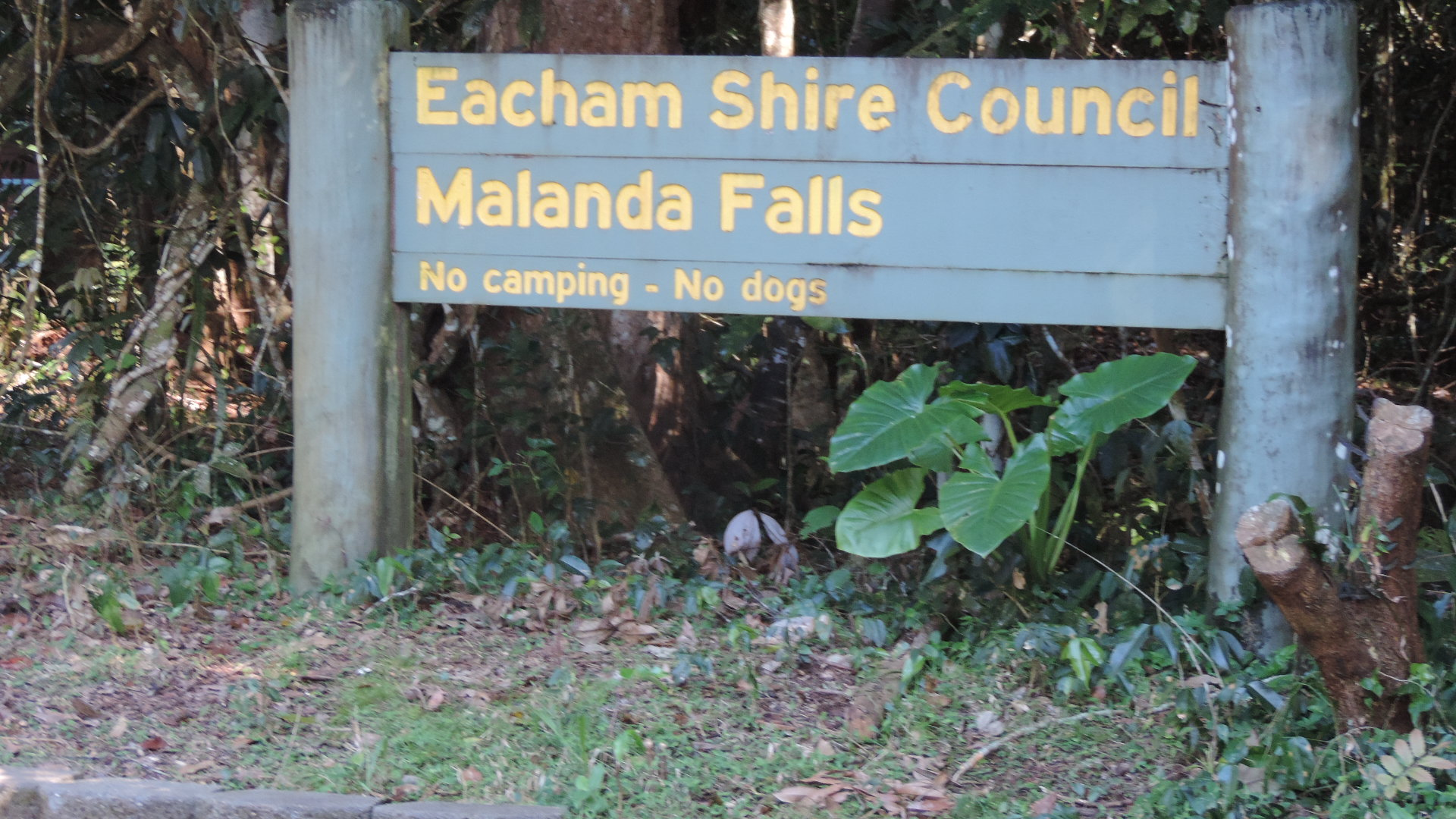
Council sign at the Malanda Falls, 2016 (still extant 8 years after amalgamation)

Around 1920, the shire council began an active role in developing the Malanda Falls into the (now heritage-listed) Malanda Falls Swimming Pool and associated infrastructure, initially for local recreation but then increasingly to attract tourists to the area via Cairns.

On 15 March 2008, under the Local Government (Reform Implementation) Act 2007 passed by the Parliament of Queensland on 10 August 2007, the Shire of Eacham merged with the Shires of Atherton, Herberton and Mareeba to form the Tablelands Region.

== Towns and localities ==
The Shire of Eacham included the following settlements:

- Malanda
- Yungaburra
- Butchers Creek
- Glen Allyn
- Jaggan
- Lake Eacham
- Maalan
- Millaa Millaa
- North Johnstone
- Palmerston^{1}
- Peeramon
- Tarzali
- Upper Barron^{2}

^{1} - shared with Cassowary Coast Region
^{2} - split with the former Shire of Atherton

== Population ==
Year	Population
1933	4,324
1947	3,740
1954	3,771
1961	3,842
1966	3,598
1971	3,327
1976	3,433
1981	4,137
1986	5,135
1991	5,609
1996	6,074
2001	6,076
2006	6,359

== Chairmen and mayors ==
- 1927: R. E. McHugh
- 1988–2000: Philip English
- 2000–2004: Mary Lyle
- 2004–2008: Ray Byrnes
