= St James' Church, Malanda =

St James Catholic Church, Malanda
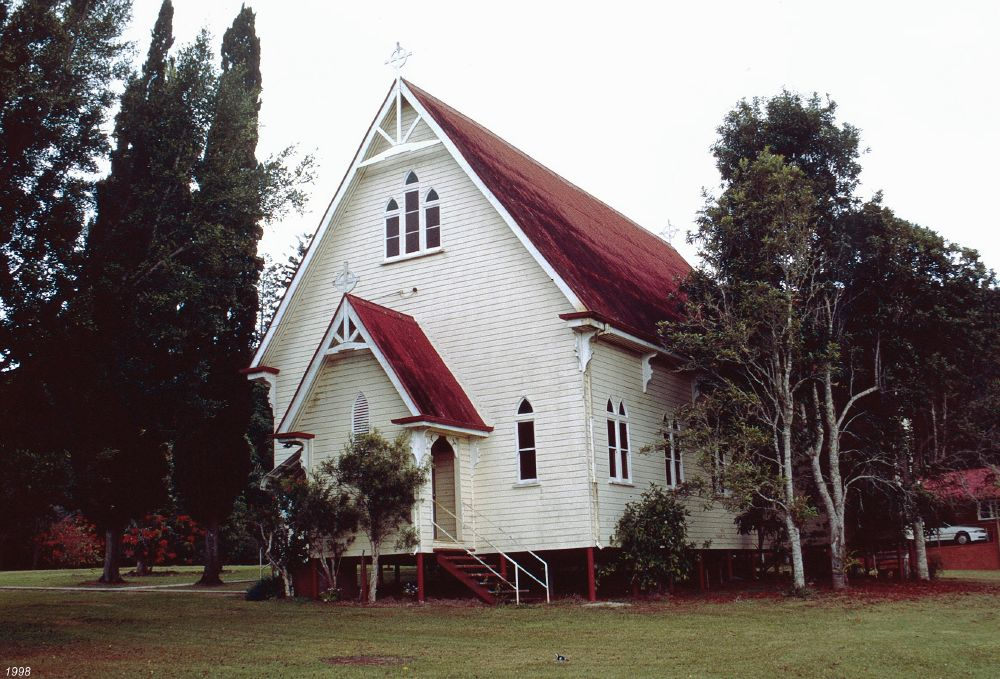
- St James Catholic Church, 1998
- St James Catholic Church, Malanda
- 17.3536°S 145.5891°E
- Address: Monash Avenue, Malanda, Tablelands Region, Queensland
- Country: Australia
- Denomination: Roman Catholic
- Website: www.rcp-mmm.org.au/churches/st-james-malanda/

History
- Status: Church
- Dedication: James, brother of Jesus
- Dedicated: 23 January 1927 by Bishop John Heavey

Architecture
- Architect: Robert Ransom Hassall
- Architectural type: Church
- Style: Gothic Revival
- Years built: 1926–1927

Specifications
- Materials: Timber; corrugated iron

Administration
- Diocese: Cairns
- Parish: Malanda

Queensland Heritage Register
- Official name: St James Catholic Church and Altar
- Type: State heritage (built, landscape)
- Designated: 28 July 2000
- Reference no.: 601283
- Significant period: 1920s (historical); Ongoing (social)
- Significant components: Furniture/fittings, views to, stained glass window/s, views from, church
- Builders: Albert (Albie) Halfpapp

St James Catholic Church is a heritage-listed Roman Catholic church located in Monash Avenue, Malanda, Tablelands Region, Queensland, Australia. It was designed by Robert Ransom (Bob) Hassall, built by Albie Halfpapp in late 1926, and was opened on 23 January 1927. It was added to the Queensland Heritage Register on 28 July 2000.

The church is administered by the Parish of Malanda, in Diocese of Cairns.

== History ==
The St James Catholic church of Malanda was constructed late in 1926. Malanda resident, Mr Robert Ransom Hassall (Bob) designed the church. Another local, Mr Albert (Albie) Halfpapp built the church. The Altar was built by Stephen (Steve) Purcell of Mareeba in 1928, meticulously copying the one designed and made by Rooney & Co. in Townsville for St Thomas of Villanova Church in Mareeba in 1910 (burned down in 1931). Both church and altar were built from local timbers. Mr James English, Chairman of the St James Church building committee, donated money to the Church's building fund and provided the land on which the Church was built.

Amongst the first settlers in Malanda was the family of James English. English, who became known as the founder of Malanda, came from the Lismore district of New South Wales seeking cedar, in 1907. In that year, the Group Settlement Act was passed by the Queensland Government, allowing groups of selectors, being either family groups or people who knew each other, to apply for adjoining blocks prior to a whole area being opened up for selection. This was designed to encourage the first settlers to help each other. The Malanda area was opened up under this scheme and the English family was one of the first groups to take up land. James English took up two parcels of land, with his son Patrick taking another two. Two friends who had accompanied English from New South Wales, Percy and Stan Davies, also took up land. This gave the English group a large portion of the available land.

With much timber on the adjoining properties English erected a timber mill. A defunct mill at Tolga was dismantled and reconstructed at Malanda. This mill supplied timber for many buildings of the Malanda township such as shops in English Street as well as the Majestic Picture Theatre and the Malanda Hotel.

James English who with his wife Catherine had entertained many visitors to the district, saw the need for a hotel for travellers once the Tablelands railway line arrived from Yungaburra in 1910. He applied for a licence and built the Malanda Hotel, this is still in the English family.

In the early 1900s there were no church buildings in Malanda and any services or religious ceremonies were held in the hall next to the hotel. In 1925 the Catholic community of which the English family were staunch members, decided to build a church. At a meeting on the 9 August 1925 a building committee was formed to attend to the construction of a Catholic church. At subsequent meetings it was decided to build a church that could accommodate 200 people. Mr Hassell was commissioned to draw up plans and specifications and Mr Lynch was appointed foreman of works. Mr Halfpapp was deputed to build the church with the help of a permanent assistant, at the rate of 2 pounds 7 shillings per day for the two, with the additional help of three men for two weeks to start the work off. The building was to have a concrete floor with ironbark blocks. The outside walls were to be of water gum chamfers, and the ceiling and lining of bull oak, with all other timbers to be left to Mr Hassell to determine. At later meetings, the proposal for a concrete floor was altered to that of a wooden floor, and the further suggestion was made that a choir gallery be included in the plans, if the estimate did not exceed £1,000. Timber mills from Millaa Millaa, Glen Allyn, Kureen, Yungaburra and Malanda were asked to tender for the supply of timber. The tender was given to P English of Malanda who agreed to supply and deliver all timber to the site for 48 shillings per 100 super feet.

The first donations towards the building of the church were made by James English, who gave £100, as well as Mick Lynch, Dan O'Connell, Peter and Lou Kenny and Jack Hanrahan, who all gave £50. These men were all members of the building committee. James English then donated one acre (zero point four zero hectares) of land, valued at about £600, from the grounds of his home, upon which the church would be built. The timber for the altar is said to have come from the English property as well.

Mrs Catherine English, an avid Catholic, wanted to see the church built in her time, but she died before it was finished. The building of the church was finalised by November 1926 and the church, then named St James, was opened and blessed by Bishop John Heavey on Sunday 23 January 1927.

== Description ==
The St James Catholic Church is a small, low set, single storeyed timber church situated on a large block of land in Monash Avenue, Malanda, overlooking the town and district of Malanda.

The church is symmetrically composed and is approximately 22 metres (72 ft) long x 12 metres (39 ft) wide (excluding vestry and store-room). The building has a frontispiece, which forms a small porch that provides access to the front doors of the Church via side stairs. The high-pitched, gabled, corrugated iron roof has been painted red. A Celtic cross finial crowns each gable. The church is elevated on short round timber stumps, coloured brown. The external chamferboard walls are painted cream.

Double timber doors lead to a simple interior. The internal walls are tongue and groove, which are painted off-white. The 1960s false ceiling is constructed of fibro cement sheeting. The original tongue and groove ceiling is still visible under the sheeting. The hardwood polished floor is constructed from local rainforest timber, "black bean".

Timber stairs at the rear of the Church lead to the original choir gallery, approximately 2 metres (6 ft 7 in) wide. This space is now used for overflow seating.

There is a central aisle leading down to the altar. On either side of the aisle are nine timber pews constructed from maple. The communion rail has been removed; however its original location is still visible in the timber floorboards.

Tall, narrow, sharply-pointed widows ('lancet') are located on all sides of the building. Each comprises three glass panes. The bottom pair of frames form a sash-window, whilst the top pane is fixed. The sash-windows are coloured yellow, whilst the fixed pane is coloured green. Some of the windows have been replaced over the years with clear glass panes. A single lancet is located in the frontispiece, however, instead of a glass pane, fixed timber louvers have been used. A single widow is located on either side of the front wall of the building, in line with the window in the frontispiece. Three single lancets have been combined to form a "Trinity window" in the front and rear gable. Along each side of the church are four, double-lancet windows. Both double lancet and Trinity windows have been used in the vestry and storage room.

The building has three main exits including the double front doors and two single timber doors located at the rear of the church. One of the single doors leads from the vestry and the other from the storage room.

The original ornate timber altar transforms this otherwise simple, unadorned country church into a highly evocative place of worship. The altar consists of a flat-topped table supported by eight columns. A panel situated behind the columns has been carved with gothic designs and a Celtic cross, which has been highlighted with gold paint. Motifs painted in gold in the centre of each of the gothic panels include single grape leaves and a chalice surrounded by grapes and heads of barley. Located at the centre of the altar table is a tabernacle. Above the tabernacle is a crucifix, housed within a narrow pointed arch. Three decorative pointed arches are located on either side of the tabernacle. These are topped with ornate timber carvings. Details on the white painted carved timber are highlighted with gold paint. A Celtic cross forms the apex of the altar, which reaches upwards towards the false ceiling.

The c. 1960s timber altar is located in front of the original altar, which today allows the priest to face the congregation whilst conducting mass.

A small vestry (3.5 by 3.5 metres (11 ft × 11 ft)) is located to the right of the altar. An identical room is located on the left side of the altar. It is currently being used for storage and as a place to prepare floral arrangements for the church altar.

The Church is set back on the crest of a slope and, before the vegetation of the surrounding properties matured, would have had commanding views of the town and district of Malanda. The Presbytery, residence of the parish priest, is located at the rear of the Church.

== Heritage listing ==
St James Catholic Church and Altar was listed on the Queensland Heritage Register on 28 July 2000 having satisfied the following criteria.

The place is important in demonstrating the evolution or pattern of Queensland's history.

The St James Catholic Church has a special association with the life of the English Family. Known as the founders of Malanda, Mr James and Mrs Catherine English were early selectors who arrived in the region when the district was opened up in 1907 under the Queensland Government's Group Settlement Act.

The place is important in demonstrating the principal characteristics of a particular class of cultural places.

The St James Catholic Church is a fine example of a timber church.

The place is important because of its aesthetic significance.

The simple design, incorporating carved internal detailing and furniture, demonstrates a high level of craftsmanship using local timber. The reredos, a remarkable and highly ornate original fitting, has been retained and adapted to suit changes in the liturgy.

The place has a strong or special association with a particular community or cultural group for social, cultural or spiritual reasons.

It has a special association with the Catholic community of Malanda. Both the fund raising for the Church and its design and construction were projects involving the wider community in the early years of settlement in the region.

The place has a special association with the life or work of a particular person, group or organisation of importance in Queensland's history.

The St James Catholic Church has a special association with the life of the English Family. Known as the founders of Malanda, Mr James and Mrs Catherine English were early selectors who arrived in the region when the district was opened up in 1907 under the Queensland Government's Group Settlement Act.
