= Majestic Picture Theatre, Malanda =

Majestic Picture Theatre
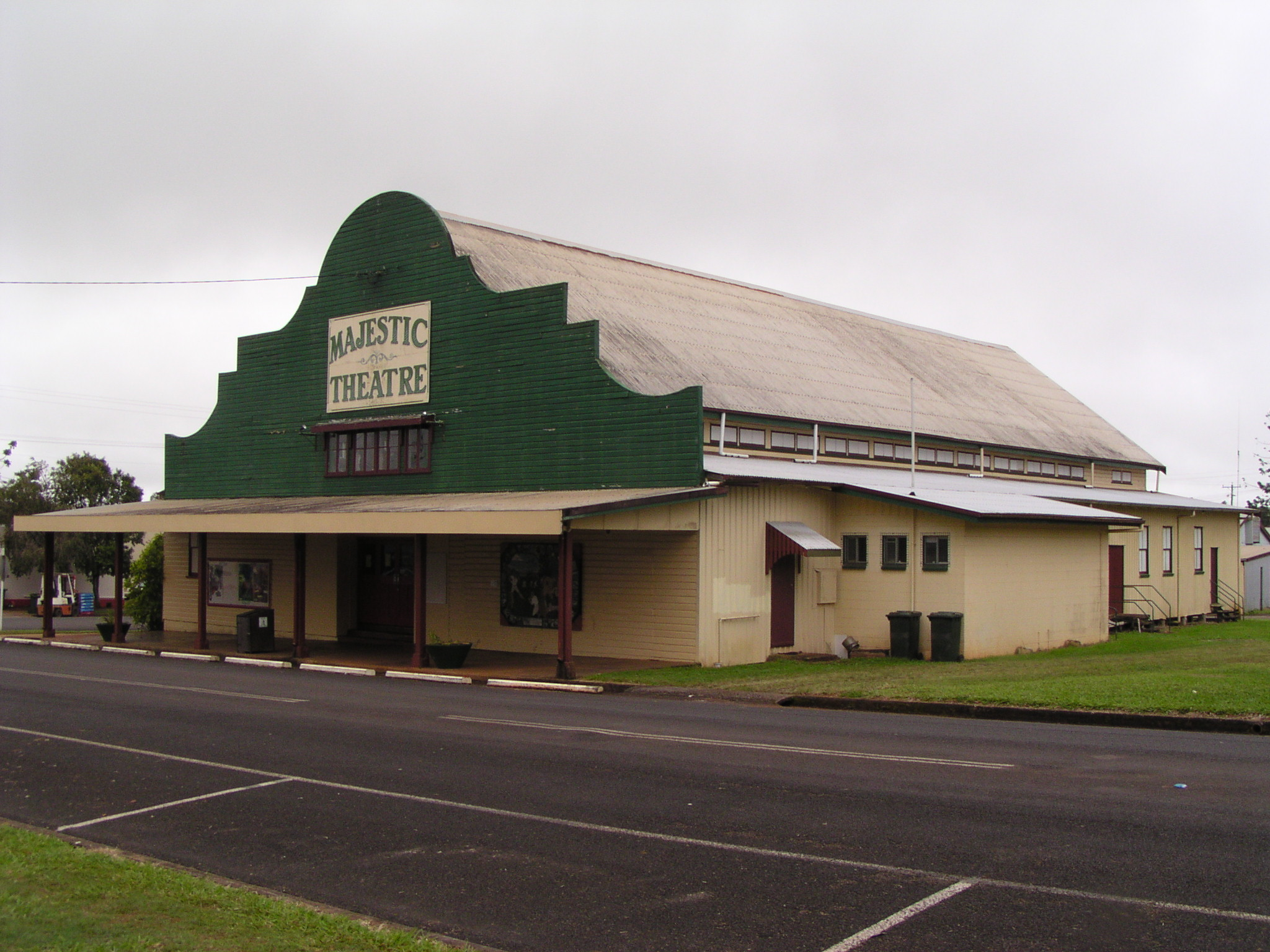
- Majestic Picture Theatre, 2006

- Location within Queensland Location within Australia
- 17.3534°S 145.5929°E
- Location: 1 Eacham Place, Malanda, Tablelands Region, Queensland, Australia

History
- Design period: 1919–1930s (interwar period)
- Built: 1929

Site notes
- Architect: Bob Hassall

Queensland Heritage Register
- Official name: Majestic Picture Theatre, Majestic Theatre
- Type: state heritage (built)
- Designated: 5 February 2010
- Reference no.: 601743
- Significant period: 1929–ongoing
- Significant components: cinema screen
- Builders: Albie Halfpapp

Majestic Picture Theatre is a heritage-listed theatre at 1 Eacham Place, Malanda, Tablelands Region, Queensland, Australia. It was designed by Bob Hassall and built in 1929 by Albie Halfpapp. It is also known as Majestic Theatre. It was added to the Queensland Heritage Register on 5 February 2010.

In 2016, the theatre is still in use for films and claims to be Australia's longest running commercial cinema.

== History ==
The Majestic Picture Theatre was built in 1929 and is associated with one of Malanda's prominent settler families, the English family.

James English, widely acknowledged as the "founder of Malanda", migrated to North Queensland from the Lismore district of New South Wales in 1907 in search of cedar. Although the abundance of timber on the Atherton Tablelands made the move profitable, it was the Queensland Government's 1907 Group Settlement Act that enabled English to take full advantage of the surrounding resources and establish himself and his family in the region. This Act permitted groups of selectors (including family groups or acquaintances) to apply for adjoining blocks prior to an area being opened for selection. The rainforest around Malanda was opened up under this scheme, and the English family was one of the first groups to take up land. James English established the Princes Sawmill near Malanda Falls to process timber cut in the area as farms were cleared. This mill supplied timber for many buildings in the Malanda township such as commercial shops in English Street, the Malanda Hotel and, in 1929, the Majestic Picture Theatre. English also established "The Jungle" an important tourist attraction in Malanda during the 1920s.

Malanda expanded rapidly during the interwar period. Local dairy farmers successfully agitated for their own branch of the Atherton Tablelands Cooperative Butter and Bacon Company in 1919.

Patrick "Paddy" English decided to look beyond the family's sawmilling, dairying, farming and hotel activities and pursue an emerging sensation in public entertainment: the "Cinematographe" (moving pictures). English opened Malanda's first permanent picture theatre on 16 May 1925, variously known as the Malanda Theatre, the Malanda Hall and English's Hall.

The Gillies Highway opened in 1926 and brought more tourists to the town. In addition, alluvial gold was found at the nearby Boonjie Goldfields in 1928, bringing more wealth into the town.

In 1929, English built a new picture theatre, the Majestic Picture Theatre. It was designed as a "tropical" theatre by local North Queensland architect Bob Hassell and constructed by builder Albie Halfpapp. A hard top theatre, with an auditorium designed to enhance air circulation, the place reflected a popular type of purpose-built picture theatre in interwar Queensland. Completed in December 1929, it was a timber-framed structure clad in weatherboards with a Gabled roof and timber-clad parapet, and was constructed entirely of rainforest hardwoods. The theatre was dedicated and opened on 14 December 1929 by John Edward Foxwell, Eacham Shire Council Chairman, and Fred Browning, superintendent of Atherton Ambulance Centre. All proceeds from a concert held on opening night were donated to the Atherton Ambulance. Screening of the first films took place on 21 December 1929.

Large, purpose-built, single auditorium picture theatres, both open-air and hard-top, were constructed throughout Queensland during the interwar period. Almost every town and suburb in Queensland had its local picture theatre by the late 1930s. Many of these structures, including the Majestic Picture Theatre at Malanda, employed recognised facade "styles" which the public came to associate with film exhibition venues. Like many of the fanciful names given to Queensland picture theatres, the name "Majestic" was derivative of much grander overseas theatres and cinemas.

Initially, Silent films were accompanied by an in-house pianist. The casework for the Beale Piano at the Majestic was made to order by the Beale Company in New South Wales from figured maple, cut on Patrick English's property and specially selected and sawn by him. When "talking pictures" were introduced, English purchased a Raycophone voice machine, designed by New South Wales radio engineer Ray Allsop. Raycophones were widely adopted by Australian cinemas – by mid-1937, when the sound wiring of all 1,420 Australian cinemas was complete, 345 Raycophone systems had been installed.

The Majestic Picture Theatre has been owned and operated independently since it opened in 1929. In 1933, English sold the theatre to Pollard Bros who also owned and ran the Roxy Theatre in Atherton. Jack Henson purchased the theatre in 1939 and ran it with his wife, Lil Henson, during World War II until 1969. Thousands of war-time U.S. servicemen were based on the Atherton Tablelands and the theatre was an important social venue and meeting place for troops and locals during the war. Picture nights were held on Wednesdays, Fridays and Saturdays, and the American troops often used the hall to hold dances. Newsreels were an important communication tool during this era, and screenings at the Majestic kept troops and locals up-to-date with the latest war news.

Following the war, picture theatres remained popular entertainment venues for Australian families. The newsreel connected country audiences with news of the day, including their first close-up view of a newly elected national leader or Australia's latest sporting hero. However, the advent of television during the mid-1950s began to erode attendance at cinemas – although this change was not as immediate in country areas as in the larger towns and cities.

For almost three generations, a pair of Simplex 35 mm projectors, manufactured in the early 1930s, coupled with Western Electric sound units, provided Majestic Picture Theatre patrons with high quality and reliable exhibition until 1984. The Simplex machines, one of which is on permanent display in the theatre foyer, were replaced "piecemeal" from 1984 by Westrex Simplex RCA and Starscope 14 lamp-houses that continue the tradition of carbon arc illumination. In 2000, the theatre's sound system was upgraded with the installation of a Dolby Digital Cinema Processor along with three 15" front-of-house Altec speakers and horns (left, centre and right of screen), and with 24 (12 left and 12 right) surround speakers.

Like many other picture theatres in north Queensland, the Majestic has also been used for community meetings. Shareholders of the Atherton Tablelands Cooperative Butter Association, for example, used the premises as a meeting place for 47 years. Significantly, it was the venue where Tableland dairy farmers resolved to go on strike on 1 March 1947 when the government decided not to subsidise northern dairy farmers after the 1946 drought after subsidising farmers in the south.

With the introduction of television services to the Tablelands in the 1960s patronage of the Majestic Picture Theatre at Malanda declined. As a business the Majestic became unviable and the Henson's put the place on the market. Rather than see it close, Eacham Shire Council negotiated to purchase the building for $8,000. They have since been responsible for its maintenance. The Council continued screening films for a time and then leased it to series of film exhibitors in the 1970s.

The availability of affordable Video players and the convenience of cassette hire further reduced attendance at picture theatres during the 1980s. Malanda Little Theatre Company, which later became the Malanda Theatre Company, leased the Majestic Picture Theatre for 15 years in 1981. They staged theatrical plays and in turn sub-let the building for film screenings. One day a month, the building was sub-let to stall holders for a market before this was transferred to the Malanda Showgrounds. The Majestic was leased to Stuart Cardwell in 1990, who operated it in a share arrangement with the Malanda Theatre Company until 2004.

In 2010, films were still being screened regularly at the Majestic Picture Theatre by an independent exhibitor (every Friday and Saturday and some Sundays). The Malanda Theatre Company was still staging productions at this venue, alternating performances with film exhibition.

In 2016, the theatre is still in use for films and claims to be Australia's longest running commercial cinema.

== Description ==
The Majestic Picture Theatre is located on the corner of Eacham Place and Catherine Street in Malanda on the Atherton Tableland opposite the Malanda Post Office. The theatre is a prominent building in the township and is located near the Malanda Hotel, which is still owned by the English family, the original proprietors of the theatre.

The theatre is a large timber-framed building with a decorative curved and stepped parapet concealing the Gabled roof auditorium and skillion roofed aisles of the theatre behind. The building is supported on concrete stumps and local rainforest hardwood is used throughout the building for framing, cladding and flooring.

The building's facade facing Eacham Place to the north-west is lined horizontally with painted chamferboards. Accessed from the footpath by three concrete stairs, the entrance to the theatre is recessed and comprises a pair of single light three panel doors with single panel sidelights. A poster bill frame hangs on the wall between the entrance and a double-hung two light sash window to the north and a mosaic mural (created as part of the Centenary of Federation celebrations) hangs on the south side of the entrance.

Six timber posts fixed to raised concrete footings support a later metal sheeted timber framed awning over the footpath. Centred in the wall above the awning, four pairs of two light Casement windows provide natural light and ventilation to the projection room. Fixed above the windows is an awning and above that is signage bearing the name: "Majestic Theatre".

The north-eastern elevation facing Catherine Street is lined with metal sheeting and contains seven double-hung two light Sash windows and three pairs of exit doors with steps to street. Above the skillion roof and along the full length of the building, two light top-hung sash windows provide ventilation to the auditorium.

On the opposite side of the building the south-west elevation is similarly detailed with three exit doors and five windows as well as a door to the kitchen at its western end. A later concrete block addition that contains toilets is attached to the exterior of the original building.

The rear elevation facing a service lane is lined with ripple iron.

Internally the theatre retains many of its early features, including entrance foyer, auditorium, projection-room above the entrance foyer, mezzanine "dress circle", stage, seating and dressing rooms.

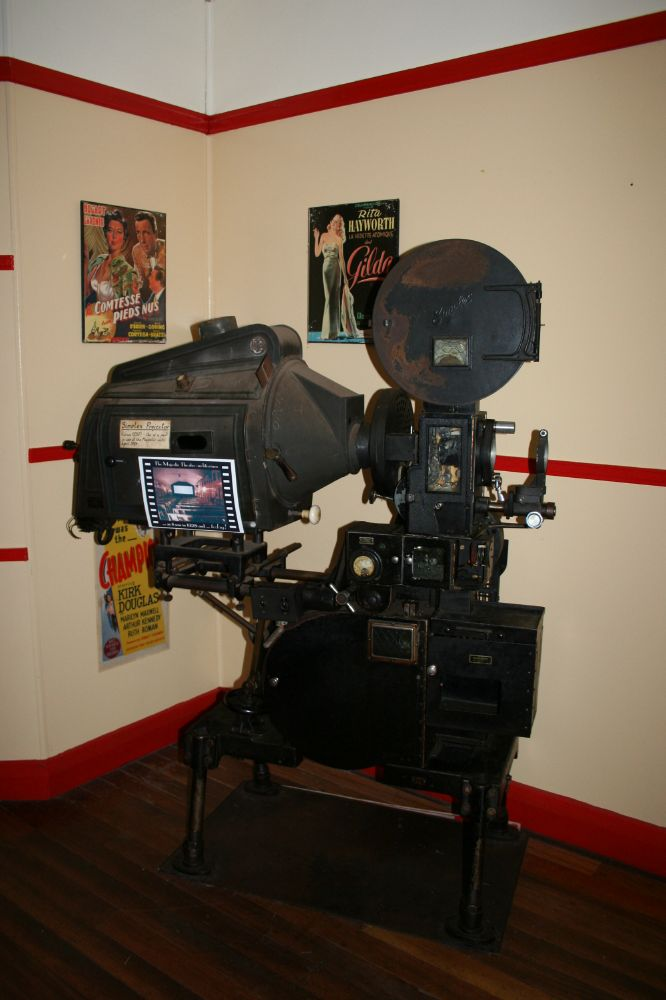
1930s Simplex projector, 2007

The entrance foyer has clear finished hardwood floors, the joinery is painted and walls and ceiling are lined with flat sheeting and cover strips. The northern side of the foyer contains a ticket box and the 1930s Simplex projector is on display. A kitchen is located on the southern side of the foyer together with a door leading to the southern aisle and to the mezzanine stairs in the auditorium.

A pair of doors from the foyer open into the auditorium, the main volume of which is separated from the aisles by timber arcades with slatted timber valances. At the south-eastern end of the auditorium furthest from the entrance doors is a hardwood stage, with a later stage area in front. The walls, balcony balustrade and ceiling of the auditorium are lined with v-jointed tongue and groove boarding and the external walls of the aisles are clad with flat sheeting. In the centre of the ceiling, a ventilation panel of timber lattice runs the length of the auditorium.

The projection room, with walls and ceilings lined with flat sheeting and timber Battens is located over the entrance foyer with the mezzanine "dress circle" either side accessed via timber steps from the aisles. The dress circle extends several metres along the walls of the auditorium and its solid balustrade is surmounted by a timber railing.

The auditorium has early oak-framed canvas seats. Originally these contained groups of one, two and four seats, but these have been replaced as groups of three and four seats, providing seating for approximately 100 patrons. There is additional seating for approximately 63 on later steel-framed canvas seats.

The dressing rooms on either side of the stage are accessed by timber doors from each aisle. Each dressing room has a double hung two-light sash window, a pair of exit doors and access to the stage via timber stairs and stage doors. Both dressing rooms have unpainted timber walls covered with chalk graffiti, particularly in the male dressing room.

== Heritage listing ==
Majestic Picture Theatre was listed on the Queensland Heritage Register on 5 February 2010 having satisfied the following criteria.

The place is important in demonstrating the evolution or pattern of Queensland's history.

The Majestic Picture Theatre, built in 1928 by one of Malanda's settler families, the English family, is one of the oldest continually operating country picture theatres in Queensland. It contributes to the analysis of how Queensland's leisure and entertainment history has evolved and is tangible evidence of this development in the tropical Far North. Before the introduction of television, picture theatres in Queensland enjoyed widespread popularity, particularly in rural areas providing not only entertainment but also a venue for social interaction. The Majestic Theatre is one of the few interwar picture theatres still screening regularly in Queensland.

The place demonstrates rare, uncommon or endangered aspects of Queensland's cultural heritage.

The Majestic Picture Theatre retains a high level of integrity and intactness and remains a rare surviving example of an interwar, single auditorium, "tropical" picture theatre. This once popular form of picture theatre construction and design in Queensland is no longer common.

The place is important in demonstrating the principal characteristics of a particular class of cultural places.

The Majestic Picture Theatre is a good example of a 1920s regional picture theatre adapted to Queensland's tropical climate. Constructed using local rainforest timbers, the building's interior and exterior intactness is notable, and the place is important in illustrating the principal characteristics of its type, including: the distinctive form and curved and stepped front parapet; the entrance foyer with early ticket box and display of early film projection equipment; the projection box located above the entrance foyer; the large auditorium with its ceiling ventilation panels, mezzanine "dress circle", and early seating; and the early stage and associated dressing rooms.
