= Malanda Falls Swimming Pool =

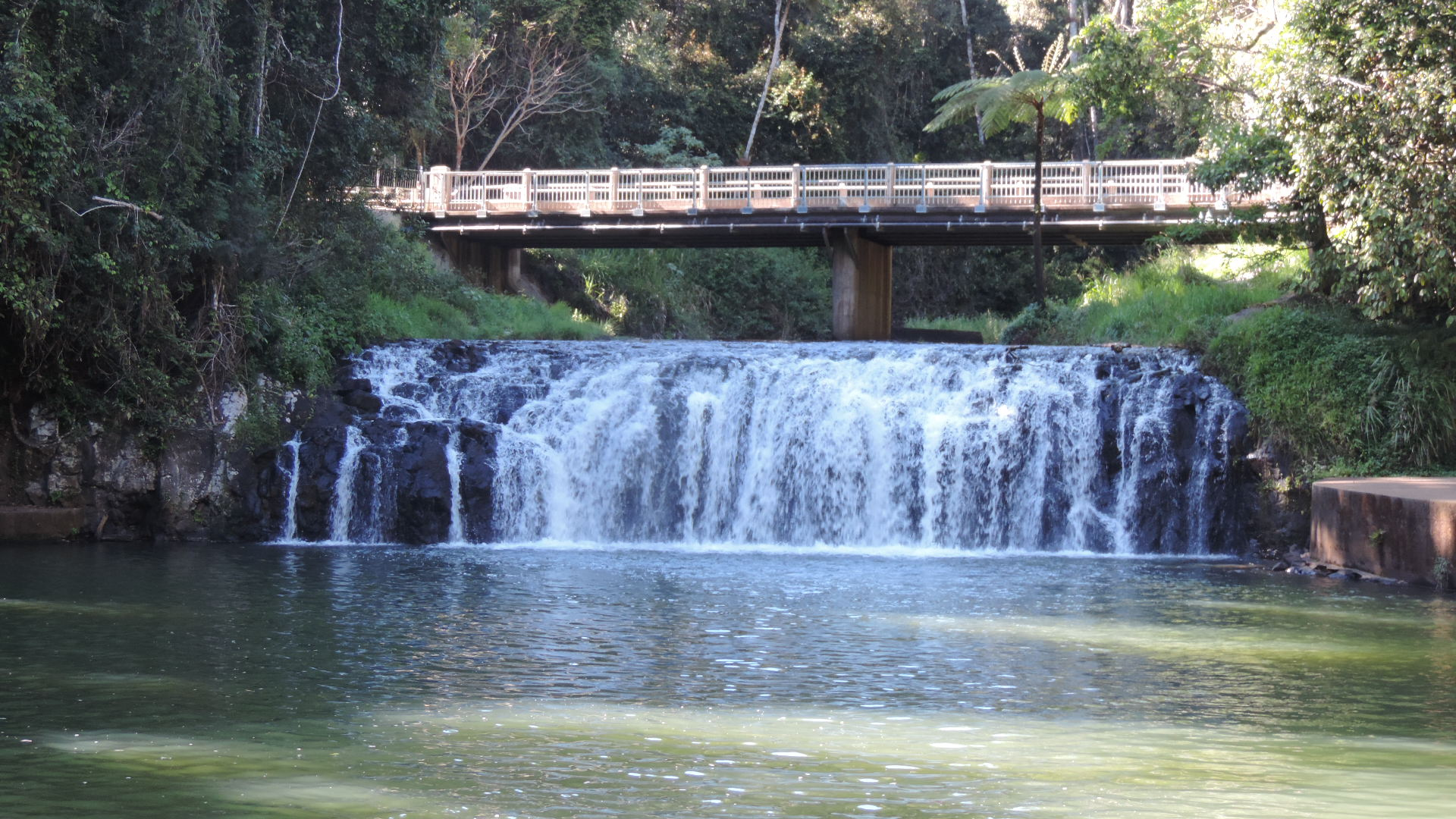
- Malanda Falls, 2016

- Location within Queensland Location within Australia
- 17.3546°S 145.5862°E
- Location: Malanda Falls Park, Malanda, Tablelands Region, Queensland, Australia

History
- Design period: 1900–1914 (early 20th century)
- Built: 1906 onwards

Queensland Heritage Register
- Official name: Malanda Falls Swimming Pool
- Type: state heritage (built)
- Designated: 5 February 2010
- Reference no.: 602733
- Significant period: 1906 onwards

Malanda Falls Swimming Pool is a heritage-listed swimming pool at Malanda Falls Park, Malanda, Tablelands Region, Queensland, Australia. It was built from 1906 onwards. It was added to the Queensland Heritage Register on 5 February 2010.

== History ==
Malanda Falls Swimming Pool is located on the North Johnstone River in the Malanda Falls Park, adjacent to the Malanda Falls Conservation Park on the Atherton Tableland. First developed as a local recreation area during the early 20th century, Malanda Falls became associated with organised tourism on the Atherton Tableland from the 1920s and has been important in the development of the Cairns hinterland as a major tourist region in Queensland.

Despite the focus of early settlers and investors on economic exploitation of the landscape on the Atherton Tableland, a number of tourist attractions emerged based on the very resources being exploited and were largely framed in Romantic terms. Early non-indigenous visitors to the Atherton Tableland were fascinated with waterfalls and their jungle backdrop, variously described and depicted as sublime, beautiful and picturesque. Timeless in their appeal, these natural features were and continue to be essential to the success of the region in attracting tourists.

Due to its proximity to the township of Malanda, the Falls have always been popular for local recreation and have been adapted over the last century to meet the needs of the local community and to enhance its beauty and bush surrounds as a tourist attraction.

The Malanda Falls was surveyed in 1906 when it was described as being "partly covered with water lilies, and jungle stretched to the edge of the pool, with lots of fallen trees [in the] water". With the exception of the installation of hydraulic rams in 1911 to supply water to the Malanda Hotel and to steam trains, it would appear that the Falls remained undisturbed until 1918 when the local community cleared the underwater logs from the pool. The Falls quickly became a popular venue for New Year's Day picnic day celebrations and by 1920 the Eacham Shire Council had erected a substantial wooden diving platform and signs warning against nude bathing.

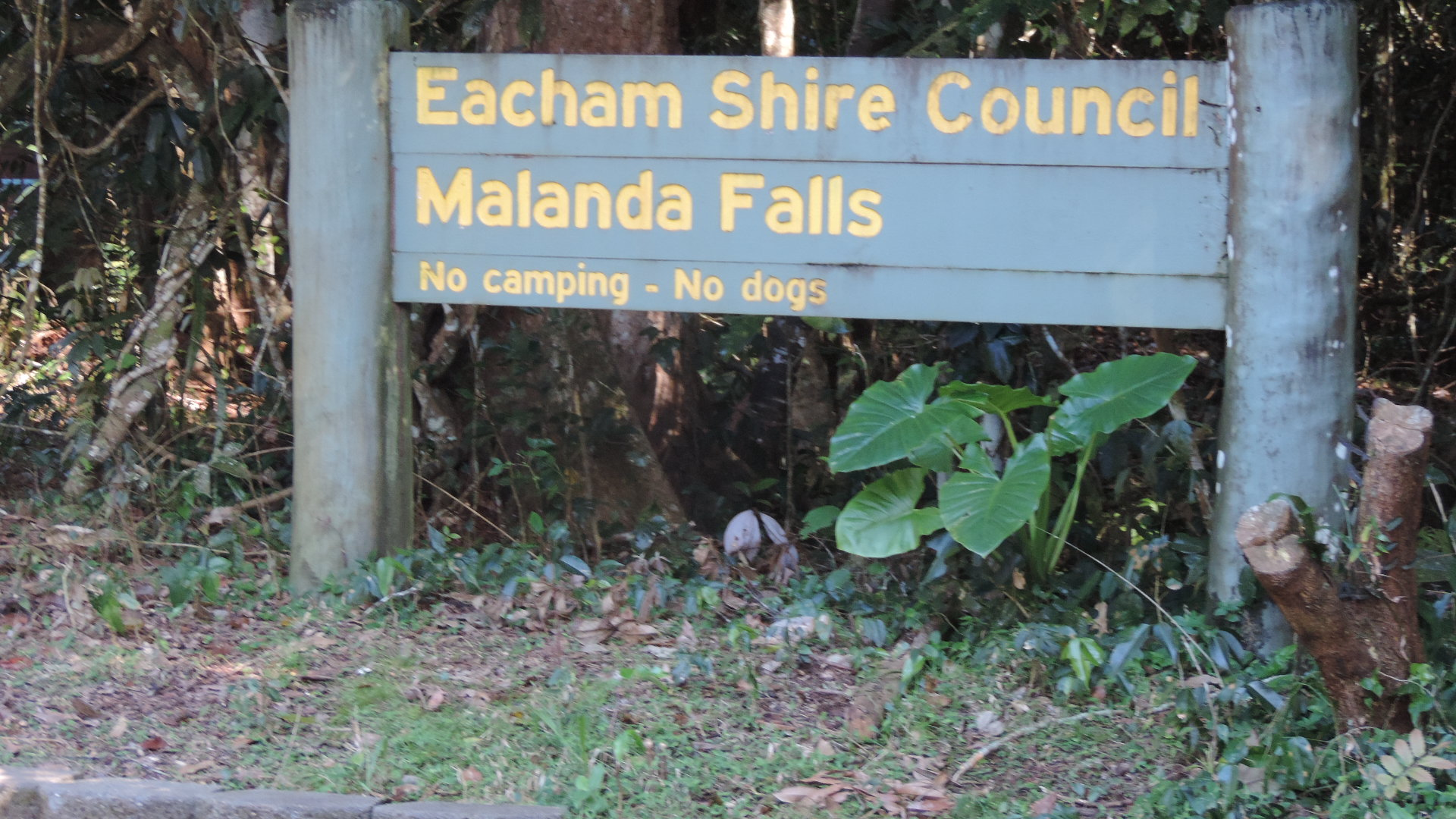
Eacham Shire Council sign, 2016

Other modifications included a wire netting fence erected around an unspecified area of the Malanda Falls Reserve in 1924, possibly to keep wandering animals from damaging the area. In 1925 when a retaining wall and a "narrow turning platform for swimmers, 25 yards from the bank" were built, Malanda's first swimming club was formed. Swimming carnivals were held between Malanda, Atherton, Mareeba and Cairns clubs in the pool until 1930. By 1934 the Malanda Swimming Club and the Eacham Shire Council had both contributed to the pool and surrounding reserve, with the Council's contribution amounting to £182/19/8 in 1933. The Department of Lands approved an additional advance of £50.00 for further enhancement works in 1934, and the Council engineer was instructed to look into building a path to the bottom of the Falls which was formed with terracing and gardens.

A significant feature of early tourism in the Cairns region was its use of the increasingly sophisticated transport infrastructure to service the mining, timber and agricultural industries. Development in Far North Queensland like other regions in Queensland was hampered by a lack of basic infrastructure. The construction of the Tablelands railway from Cairns to Mareeba provided for the development of the Barron Falls into one of the most popular tourist attractions in Queensland in the 1890s. Malanda Falls was also to benefit from this, when in 1910 the railway was extended to Malanda and a railway bridge erected spanning the Johnstone River just above the Falls allowing excursioners from other parts of the Atherton Tableland to visit the Falls more easily. It was not until the construction of the Gillies Highway in the 1920s that it became accessible to a greater number of people, notably tourists.

Photographs of Malanda Falls appeared in tourism literature as early as 1920 and in 1925 the Falls were part of a day trip from either Herberton or Ravenshoe. This day trip was by car and also included on the itinerary were visits to Lake Barrine, Lake Eacham and Millaa Millaa Falls. Whitecars, a local hire-car service, commenced day tours of the southern Tableland c. 1926 offered two tours to Malanda Falls: one including a visit to Glen Allyn Falls and the Malanda township, and the other incorporating a tour of the Malanda Butter Factory and The Jungle, an attraction which featured Aboriginal culture and the wonders of the rainforest.

Established c. 1922, Whitecars was integral to the development of tourism on the Tablelands and the increased popularity of region's attractions. Initially, Whitecars owners, Les Battle and Norm Graham, developed a timetabled taxi service between Malanda, Yungaburra and Atherton, and between Malanda and Millaa Millaa, with three cars. They took advantage of the 1926 opening of the Gillies Highway, linking the southern Tableland with Cairns, to take Ned Williams into partnership as The Cairns Tableland Motor Service Ltd to capitalise on the expected influx of tourists. In 1927 the company won the tender to transport passengers between Cairns and the southern Tableland via the Gillies Highway, and to operate day tours on the Tableland out of Yungaburra. In 1934 Whitecars introduced its first bus, capable of carrying 17 passengers to the area which, by this time, was being described in tourist guides featuring the Falls as "the land of waterfalls, cataracts and cascades".

In the 1950s and 1960s, the Malanda Falls were included in the Grand Tour/Tropical Wonderland Tour itineraries promoted by the Queensland Government Tourist Bureau (by then part of Queensland Railways). The Grand Tour operated during the winter months when a P&O ship would arrive at Cairns each week from Melbourne and Brisbane carrying around 200 passengers for a six-day stay in the region. Upon arrival passengers could join the Tropical Wonderland Tour, which included being taken by White cars to visit the attractions of the Atherton Tableland, including not only the Malanda Falls but also the Millaa Millaa, Zillie and Glen Allyn Falls.

From 1942 a large number of Australian and American troops were stationed on the Atherton Tablelands during World War II. Malanda Falls was a popular swimming and picnic spot for service personnel and during the war years Australian troops upgraded the pool at the base of the Falls and built a three level platform diving tower.

As the tourism industry developed during the post war period, travel became easier and car ownership more commonplace and new tours were developed. Attractions such as Malanda Falls benefited from these changes and flourished. In 1961 a caravan park was established by the Eacham Shire Council, adjacent to the Falls with a capacity for 24 caravans, 30 camp sites and cabin accommodation for 20 people. Those staying at the caravan park inevitably visited the Falls and facilities were upgraded during the 1960s with the installation of a new concrete two-tiered diving platform along with a steel climbing frame allowing visitors to swing into the water, and grab rails and ladders to enter and leave the pool. In addition, the Malanda Swimming Club was reformed.

Malanda Falls was prominent in travel literature until the 1970s and continues to be identified as a tourist destination. The welcoming ceremony of the "Malanda Monsoon Festival" is held at Malanda Falls where traditional owners the Ngadjon Jii people invite good spirits into the town. In addition a Waterfall Ceremony is held at dusk at the Falls which includes the lighting of lanterns beside the Johnstone River.

== Description ==
Malanda Falls Swimming Pool is located within the Malanda Falls Park, adjacent to the Malanda Falls Conservation Park, and is located on the western outskirts of Malanda on the Malanda-Atherton Road.

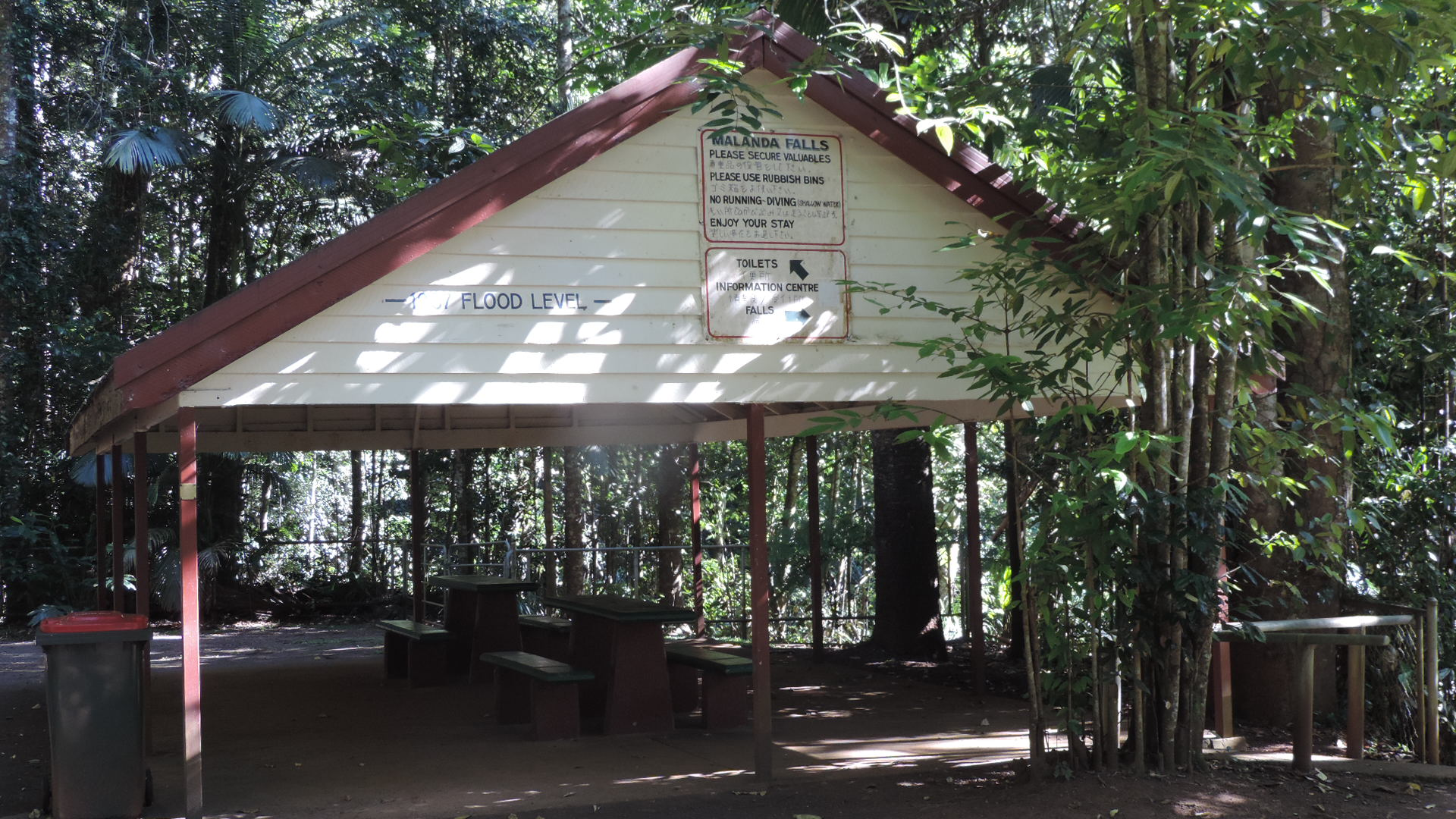
Picnic shed, 2016

Rainforest lines the road and either side of the entrance to the reserve. Beside the highway are a series of picnic tables and barbeques and a colourful mosaic honouring the area's Aborigines for whom Malanda Falls has special significance. A large car park has been developed more recently developed along with a shelter shed and toilet block.

While the rainforest backdrop is a feature of and setting for the Falls, the river banks above the pool have been benched and mostly cleared of vegetation. The western side of the pool is highly structured with stone-walled terraces, manicured lawns, an extensive network of concrete paths, fences and steps and handrails. The terraces have three main levels that are constructed from coursed rubble stonework set in mortar with a concrete capping on top. The lower terrace has three additional concrete terraces and these are generally used as seating by visitors.

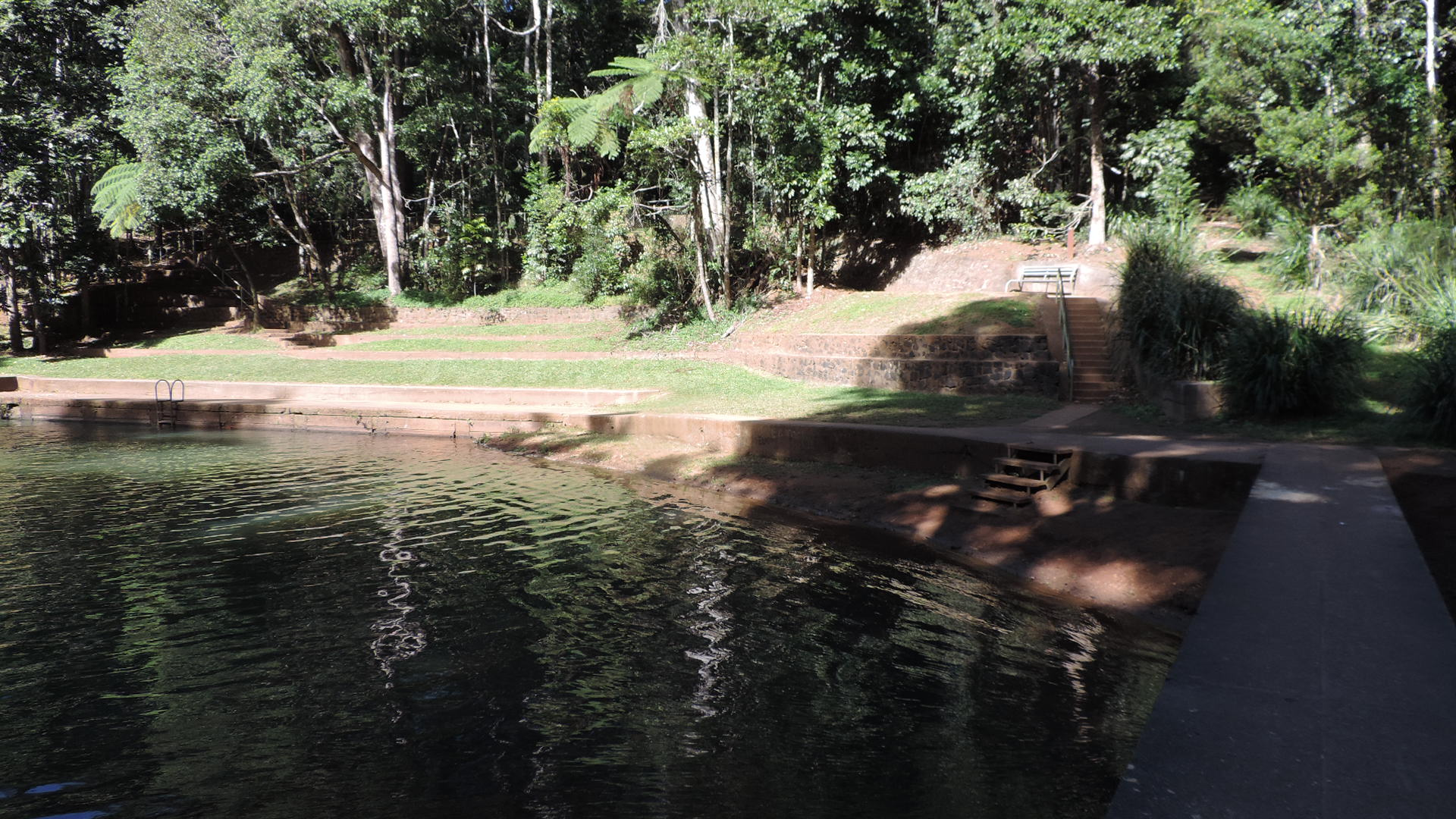
Swimming pool and terraces, 2016

The Malanda Falls Scenic Reserve comprises the North Johnstone River flowing through dense rainforest and over the basalt rock of the Falls into a man-made swimming pool. The Falls has a height of about four metres and a width of approximately 30 metres (98 ft). The long pool at its base is surrounded by concrete paths which provide easy and safe access to the pool and which allow visitors to cross the pool. At the base of the falls at the end of the concrete path on the western side, there is a metal sign affixed to the rock face with the image of a diver in red.

The concrete bridge at the north end of the pool is approximately 30 metres (98 ft) long. It leads to further concrete paths behind which a low coarse rubble retaining wall is located. Approximately halfway between the bridge and the Falls there are pool steps and a metal handrail attached to the concrete pathway. On the north eastern bank, steps with handrails lead to the Malanda Caravan Park. Further past these steps, towards the base of the Falls, are remnant concrete foundations, piping and the remains of a vertical boiler structure. The latter is riveted steel plate and is possibly associated with the water pumping activities of the Railways Department.

== Heritage listing ==
Malanda Falls Swimming Pool was listed on the Queensland Heritage Register on 5 February 2010 having satisfied the following criteria.

The place is important in demonstrating the evolution or pattern of Queensland's history.

Malanda Falls Swimming Pool demonstrates the evolution of tourism in North Queensland as an important example of how the Far North has utilised the natural environment to promote tourism in the region. Initially a swimming hole for locals, improvements to the site, such as terracing and gardens, transformed Malanda Falls from a natural waterhole to a more structured recreation area and swimming pool and since the 1930s has been a popular tourist destination.

The place is important because of its aesthetic significance.

Malanda Falls Swimming Pool is valued for its aesthetic qualities and has been recognised in tourism photographs and literature since the 1920s as a picturesque destination that forms part of Far North Queensland's waterfall and picnic circuit. The manicured swimming hole is surrounded by terraced gardens and dense rainforest. Water tumbles over a basalt rock face into a structured pool below, evoking a strong sense of tranquillity and peace.
