= Topaz, Queensland =

Suburb of Queensland, Australia

Topaz
- Suburb
- Interactive map of Topaz
- Coordinates: 17.4244°S 145.7072°E
- Country: Australia
- State: Queensland
- LGA: Tablelands Region
- Location: 20.7 km (12.9 mi) SE of Malanda; 38.4 km (23.9 mi) SE of Atherton; 85.5 km (53.1 mi) SSW of Cairns; 1,699 km (1,056 mi) NNW of Brisbane

Government
  - State electorate: Hill
  - Federal division: Kennedy

Area
  - Total: 46.4 km^{2} (17.9 sq mi)

Population
  - Total: 177 (2021 census)
  - Density: 3.815/km^{2} (9.88/sq mi)
- Time zone: UTC+10:00 (AEST)
- Postcode: 4885
Suburbs around Topaz
Glen Allyn	Butchers Creek	Wooroonooran
Wooroonooran	Topaz	Wooroonooran
Wooroonooran	Wooroonooran	Wooroonooran

Topaz is a rural locality in the Tablelands Region, Queensland, Australia. In the 2021 census, Topaz had a population of 177 people.

== History ==
Extensive alluvial gold mining between the 1870s and 1914 (World War I). Major mines included The Lady Olive, Union and Kiandra Creek. These area was designated the Extended Upper Russell River Goldfield.

Topaz State School opened on 23 February 1932 and closed in 1960. The school was at 3 Union Street (17.42344°S 145.71793°E). The school building was converted into a house and was still extant in May 2023.

== Demographics ==
In the 2016 census, Topaz had a population of 165 people.

In the 2021 census, Topaz had a population of 177 people.

== Education ==
There are no schools in Topaz. The nearest government primary school is Butchers Creek State School in neighbouring Butchers Creek to the north. The nearest government secondary school is Malanda State High School in Malanda to the north-west.
