= Gadgarra =

- Suburb
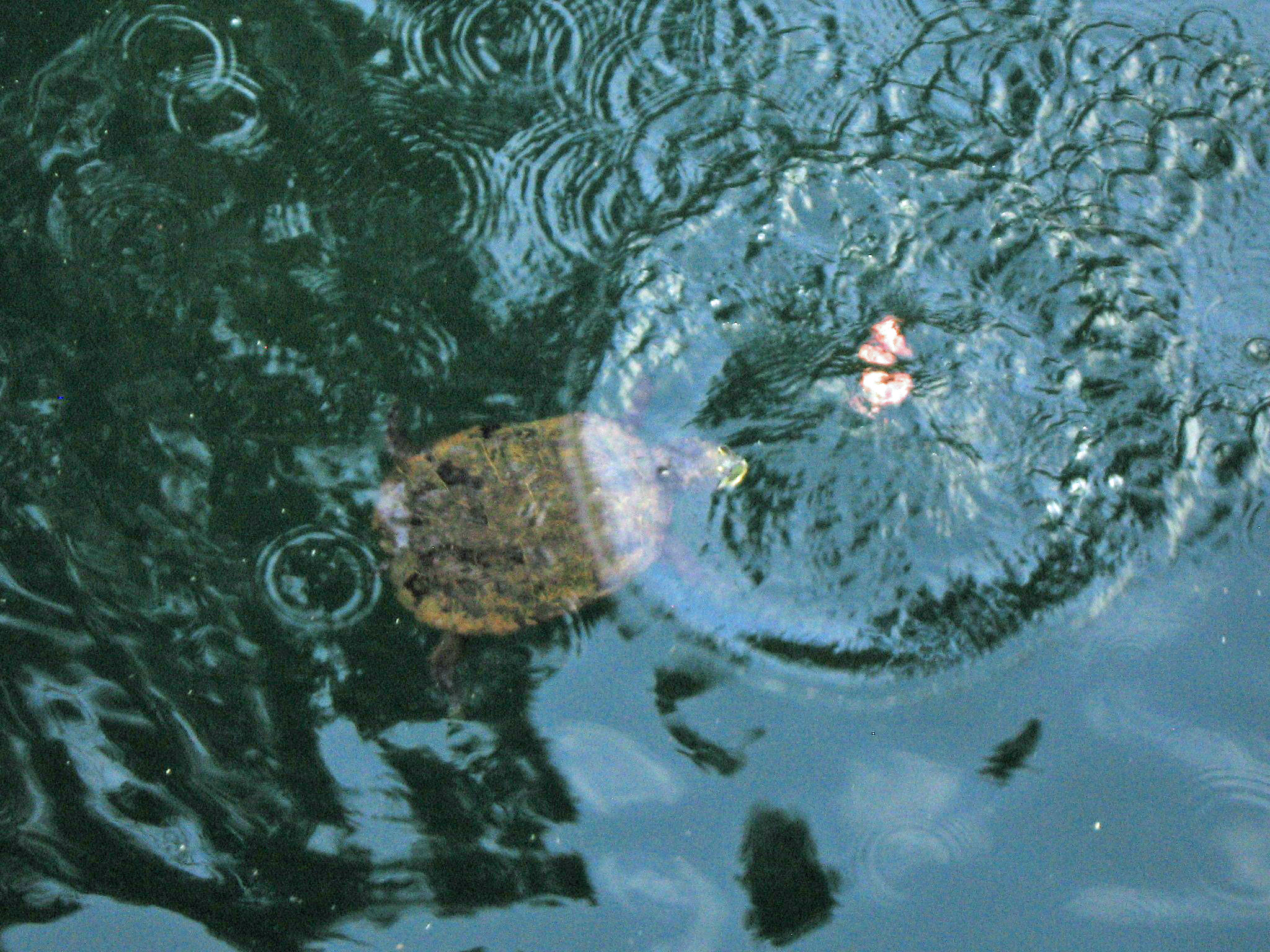
- Saw-shelled Turtle in Gadgarra

- Interactive map of Gadgarra
- Coordinates: 17.2575°S 145.7305°E
- Country: Australia
- State: Queensland
- LGA: Tablelands Region
- Location: 24.5 km (15.2 mi) SW of Gordonvale; 28.2 km (17.5 mi) NE of Malanda; 32.5 km (20.2 mi) ENE of Atherton; 47.5 km (29.5 mi) SSW of Cairns; 1,703 km (1,058 mi) NNW of Brisbane

Government
  - State electorate: Hill
  - Federal division: Kennedy

Area
  - Total: 127.2 km^{2} (49.1 sq mi)

Population
  - Total: 0 (2021 census)
  - Density: 0.000/km^{2} (0.000/sq mi)
- Time zone: UTC+10:00 (AEST)
- Postcode: 4884
Suburbs around Gadgarra
Danbulla	Lamb Range	Goldsborough
Lake Barrine	Gadgarra	Wooroonooran
Lake Eacham	Butchers Creek	Wooroonooran

Gadgarra is a rural locality in the Tablelands Region, Queensland, Australia. In the 2021 census, Gadgarra had "no people or a very low population".

== Geography ==
The northern, western and southern parts of the locality are within the Gadgarra National Park with some small sections within the Gadgarra Forest Reserve and the Goldsborough Valley State Forest. The eastern part of the locality is undeveloped.

Gadgarra has the following mountains and gorges (from north to south):

- Mount Mac (17.2209°S 145.7150°E) 899 metres (2,949 ft)
- Putts Mountain (17.2520°S 145.6948°E) 829 metres (2,720 ft)
- Caribou Gorge (17.3124°S 145.7464°E)

== History ==
Gadgarra State School opened on 28 March 1928 and closed in 1958. It was at 211 Gadgarra Road, now within the locality boundaries of neighbouring Lake Barrine (17.27156°S 145.65093°E).

== Demographics ==
In the 2016 census, Gadgarra had "no people or a very low population".

In the 2021 census, Gadgarra had "no people or a very low population".

== Education ==
There are no schools in Gadgarra. For students in the northern parts of the locality, the nearest government primary and secondary schools are Gordonvale State School and Gordonvale State High School, both in Gordonvale to the north-east. For students in the southern parts of the locality, the nearest government primary school is Yungaburra State School in Yungaburra to the west and Malanda State High School in Malanda to the south-west.

== Attractions ==
Heales Lookout is on Gillies Range Road (17.2128°S 145.6987°E).

Caribou Falls is in the national park and can be accessed from the Old Cairns Track (17.31096°S 145.74126°E). Although not in Gadgarra, but off the same track in neighbouring Wooroonooran is

Windin Falls (17.32395°S 145.74925°E).

However, access to these waterfalls is difficult and they can be dangerous as the surrounds can be slippery, particularly during or after rain.
