= Lake Barrine, Queensland =

Lake Barrine
- Suburb
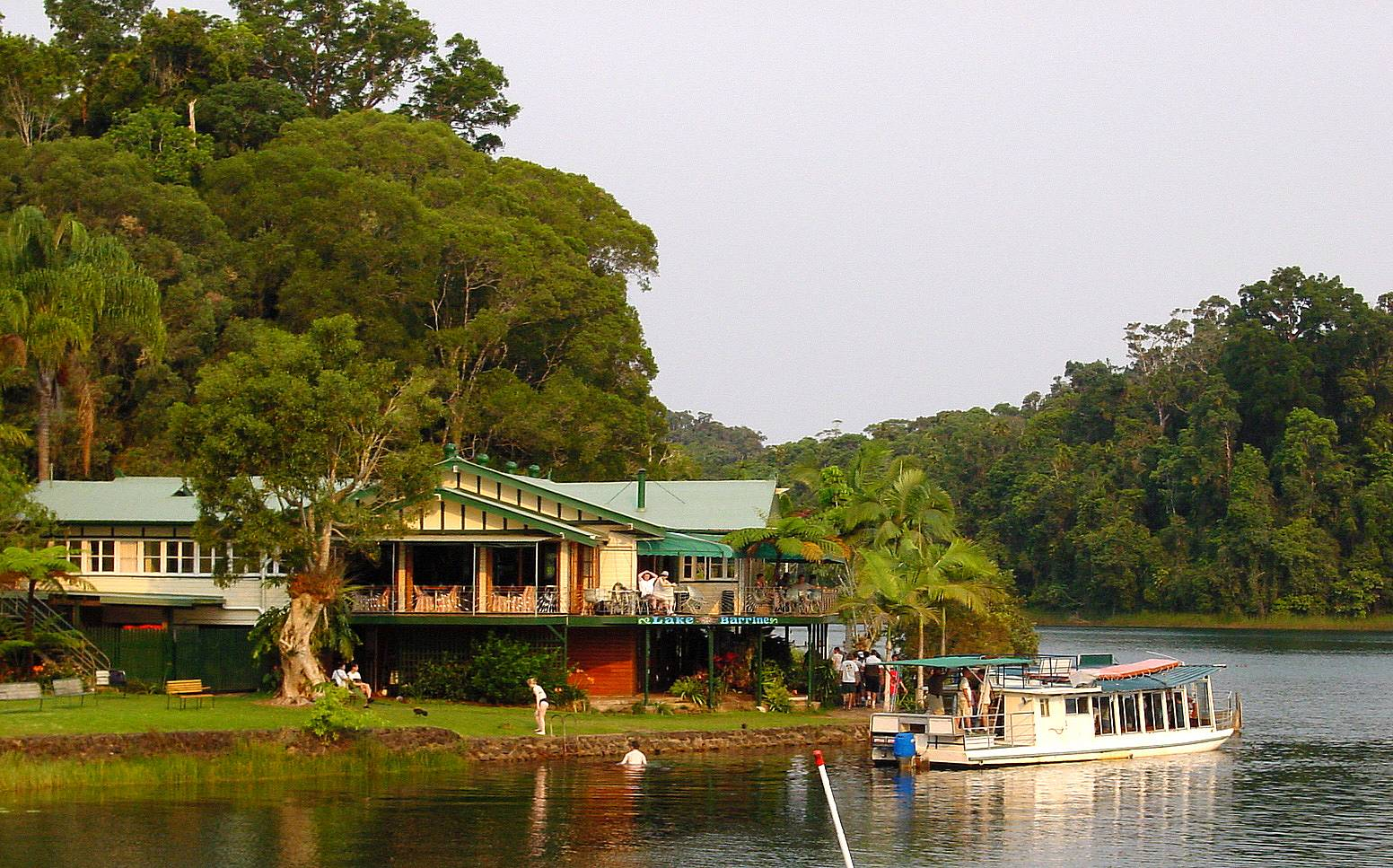
- Tea house and cruises, Lake Barrine, 2000

- Interactive map of Lake Barrine
- Coordinates: 17.2461°S 145.6408°E
- Country: Australia
- State: Queensland
- LGA: Tablelands Region
- Location: 8.7 km (5.4 mi) E of Yungaburra; 14.9 km (9.3 mi) NNE of Malanda; 21.4 km (13.3 mi) E of Atherton; 65.4 km (40.6 mi) SW of Cairns; 1,706 km (1,060 mi) NNW of Brisbane

Government
  - State electorate: Hill
  - Federal division: Kennedy

Area
  - Total: 19.4 km^{2} (7.5 sq mi)

Population
  - Total: 170 (2021 census)
  - Density: 8.76/km^{2} (22.7/sq mi)
- Time zone: UTC+10:00 (AEST)
- Postcode: 4884
Suburbs around Lake Barrine
Barrine	Danbulla	Gadgarra
Barrine	Lake Barrine	Gadgarra
Yungaburra	Lake Eacham	Gadgarra

Lake Barrine is a rural locality in the Tablelands Region, Queensland, Australia. In the 2021 census, Lake Barrine had a population of 170 people.

== Geography ==
The locality is on the Atherton Tableland. It takes its name from the lake of the same name in the west of the locality (17.2500°S 145.6333°E), which in turn comes from the Aboriginal word "barrang", meaning big water.

The locality is bounded to west by Congo Creek.

The lake and surrounding area is part of the Crater Lakes National Park. There is some rural residential housing in the south of the locality, with the land use in the rest of the locality being grazing on native vegetation.

The Gillies Range Road (also known as Gillies Highway) enters the locality from the north-east (Danbulla), passes west of the lake, and then exits the locality to the south-east (Yungaburra / Lake Eacham).

== History ==
In the 1880s, there was logging of the rainforest timbers. However, concern about the potential loss of large kauri and cedar pines near the lake led to the establishment of a scenic reserve in 1888 to protect the trees. In 1920, George and Margaret Curry established a tourism business with lake cruises and a tea house. The completion of the Cairns Range Road (now known as the Gillies Highway) from Gordonvale to Atherton in 1926 provided much better access to the area for tourists. In 1934, the Queensland Government created the Lake Barrine National Park.

Lakebank State School (sometimes written as Lake Bank State School) opened on 18 July 1922. In 1936, it was renamed Lake Barrine State School. It closed on 30 June 1949. The school was at 3426 Gillies Range Road (17.24382°S 145.64108°E).

Gadgarra State School opened on 28 March 1928 and closed in 1958. It was at 211 Gadgarra Road, now within the locality boundaries of Lake Barrine (17.27156°S 145.65093°E).

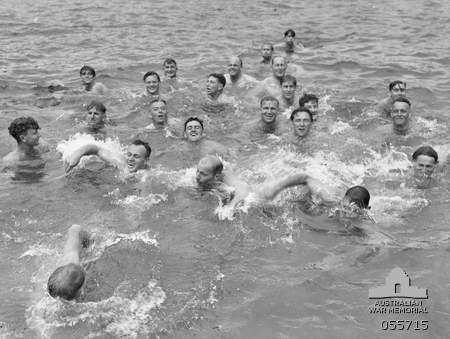
Convalescent soldiers swimming in Lake Barrine, August 1943

During World War II, air raids on Australian towns by Japan and the fear of an invasion by the Japanese led to evacuations from northern Australian towns. In March 1942, the students of St Augustine's College in Cairns were evacuated to the guest house at Lake Barrine. In late 1942, Lieutenant General Thomas Blamey decided to establish army facilities on the Atherton Tableland for the recuperation and training of troops returning from the Middle East to defend Australia against the Japanese. With 40,000 troops on the Atherton Tableland, Lake Barrine became an important recreational facility and the guest house was used by the 2/1 Australian Army Convalescent Depot. After the war ended, the Curry family resumed their tourist business at the lake.

In 1988, UNESCO declared the Wet Tropics of Queensland a World Heritage Site with 14 areas protected, one of which was 484 hectares (1,200 acres) at Lake Barrine. In 1994, the Queensland Government merged the Lake Barrine National Park and the Lake Eacham National Park to form Crater Lakes National Park.

== Demographics ==
In the 2016 census, Lake Barrine had a population of 152 people.

In the 2021 census, Lake Barrine had a population of 170 people.

== Education ==
There are no schools in Lake Barrine. The nearest government primary school is Yungaburra State School in neighbouring Yungaburra to the south-west. The nearest government secondary schools is Malanda State High School in Malanda to the south.

== Attractions ==
The lake has a day use area on Lake Barrine Access Road off the Gilles Range Road (17.2452°S 145.6388°E). It has a teahouse and is the departure point for lake cruises. It is the start/end of the lake circuit walk which has two lookout points, one of the western side of the lake (17.2549°S 145.6354°E) and the other on the southern side of the lake (17.2491°S 145.6307°E).
