= Butchers Creek =

- Suburb
- Interactive map of Butchers Creek
- Coordinates: 17.3397°S 145.6986°E
- Country: Australia
- State: Queensland
- LGA: Tablelands Region
- Location: 15.7 km (9.8 mi) NW of Malanda; 31.3 km (19.4 mi) ESE of Atherton; 78.4 km (48.7 mi) SW of Cairns; 1,702 km (1,058 mi) NNW of Brisbane

Government
  - State electorate: Hill
  - Federal division: Kennedy

Area
  - Total: 27.8 km^{2} (10.7 sq mi)

Population
  - Total: 85 (2021 census)
  - Density: 3.058/km^{2} (7.92/sq mi)
- Time zone: UTC+10:00 (AEST)
- Postcode: 4885
Suburbs around Butchers Creek
Lake Eacham	Gadgarra	Gadgarra
North Johnstone	Butchers Creek	Gadgarra
Glen Allyn	Topaz	Wooroonooran

Butchers Creek is a rural locality in the Tablelands Region, Queensland, Australia. In the 2021 census, Butchers Creek had a population of 85 people.

== Geography ==
Butchers Creek is on the eastern edge of the Atherton Tableland. It is one of the few parts of the tableland that drains eastward, its creeks being tributaries of the Mulgrave River. The area receives high rainfall and the traditional land use has been for dairying and beef fattening.

== History ==
Originally Boonjie, Butchers Creek is said to take its name from the 1887 massacre of the Ngajanji rainforest people at a bora ring (sacred initiation site). There was a second massacre in the same location approximately two years later. As explored in Ton Murray's documentary film The Skin of Others, Douglas Grant (1885 to 1951) is one known survivor of the first massacre during Australia's frontier wars. He was adopted as a child into a Scottish family, served as a soldier in World War I and became a cultural figure. In 2017, Indigenous academic Stephen Hagan called for a national audit of racist and offensive place names. In 2024, a Queensland government audit identified 43 place names in Queensland with racist slurs. The audit did not include offensive place names like Butchers Creek and the name remains.

In the early 20th century, a group of Russian immigrants established dairy farms in the area, giving it the nickname "Little Siberia".

Butchers Creek Provisional School opened on 8 October 1913 with 11 students studying under teacher John Tait. It became Butchers Creek State School in 1918. The school celebrated its centenary in 2013.

== Demographics ==
In the 2016 census, Butchers Creek had a population of 113 people.

In the 2021 census, Butchers Creek had a population of 85 people.

== Education ==
Butchers Creek State School is a government primary (Prep-6) school for boys and girls at the corner of Topaz and Gadaloff Roads (17.3612°S 145.6922°E). In 2016, the school had an enrolment of 27 students with 2 teachers and 4 non-teaching staff (2 full-time equivalent). In 2018, the school had an enrolment of 11 students with 2 teachers (1 full-time equivalent) and 4 non-teaching staff (2 full-time equivalent). It includes a special education program.

There are no secondary schools in Butchers Creek. The nearest government secondary school is Malanda State High School in Malanda to the west.

== Notable residents ==
Alexander Prokhorov, winner of the Nobel Prize for Physics in 1964, was born in Butchers Creek (then part of Peeramon) and attended Butchers Creek State School.
