= Lake Eacham =

Lake Eacham may refer to:

- Lake Eacham (Queensland), a lake in the Tablelands Region, Australia
- Lake Eacham, Queensland, a locality surrounding the lake in the Tablelands Region, Australia
