= Shire of Atherton =

Coordinates: 17°16′00.55″S 145°28′34.08″E

- Local government area
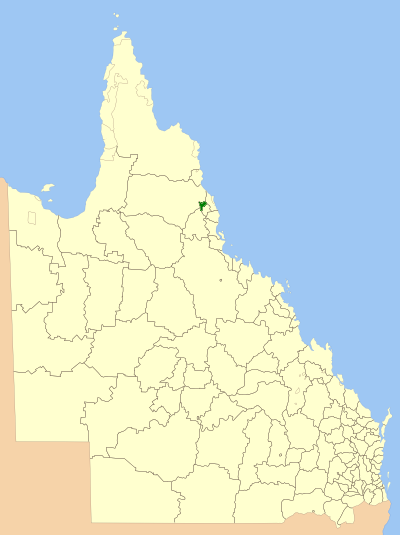
- Location within Queensland

- Country: Australia
- State: Queensland
- Region: Far North Queensland
- Established: 1881
- Council seat: Atherton

Area
  - Total: 623.1 km^{2} (240.6 sq mi)

Population
  - Total: 10,912 (2006 census)
  - Density: 17.5124/km^{2} (45.357/sq mi)
- Website: Shire of Atherton
LGAs around Shire of Atherton
Mareeba	Mareeba	Cairns
Mareeba	Shire of Atherton	Cairns
Herberton	Eacham	Eacham

The Shire of Atherton was a local government area of Queensland. It was located on the Atherton Tableland, a plateau forming part of the Great Dividing Range west of the city of Cairns. The shire, administered from the town of Atherton, covered an area of 623.1 square kilometres (240.6 sq mi), and existed as a local government entity from 1881 until 2008, when it amalgamated with several other councils in the Tableland area to become the Tablelands Region.

== History ==
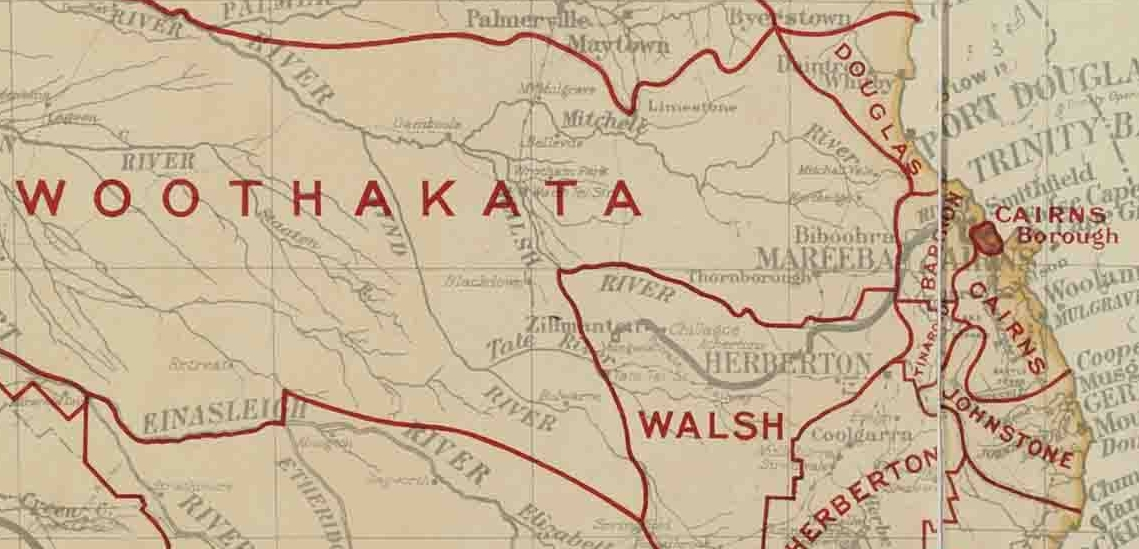
Map of Tinaroo Division and adjacent local government areas, March 1902

The Tinaroo Division was created on 3 September 1881 under the Divisional Boards Act 1879 out of parts of the Cairns, Hinchinbrook and Woothakata Divisions, and was responsible for a large area which took in Herberton and Lake Eacham.

On 20 December 1890, part of the Tinaroo Division was excised to create the new Barron Division.

In 1894, Tinaroo Division's headquarters transferred from Tinaroo to Atherton. On 11 May 1895 it decreased somewhat in size as it lost some areas in the south and southwest which incorporated separately as the Herberton Division.

With the passage of the Local Authorities Act 1902, Tinaroo Division became Shire of Tinaroo on 31 March 1903. On 18 November 1910 it lost the area around Lake Eacham to the new Shire of Eacham, and in 1935, the Shire of Tinaroo was renamed Shire of Atherton.

On 15 March 2008, under the Local Government (Reform Implementation) Act 2007 passed by the Parliament of Queensland on 10 August 2007, the Shire of Atherton merged with the Shires of Eacham, Herberton and Mareeba to form the Tablelands Region.

== Towns and localities ==
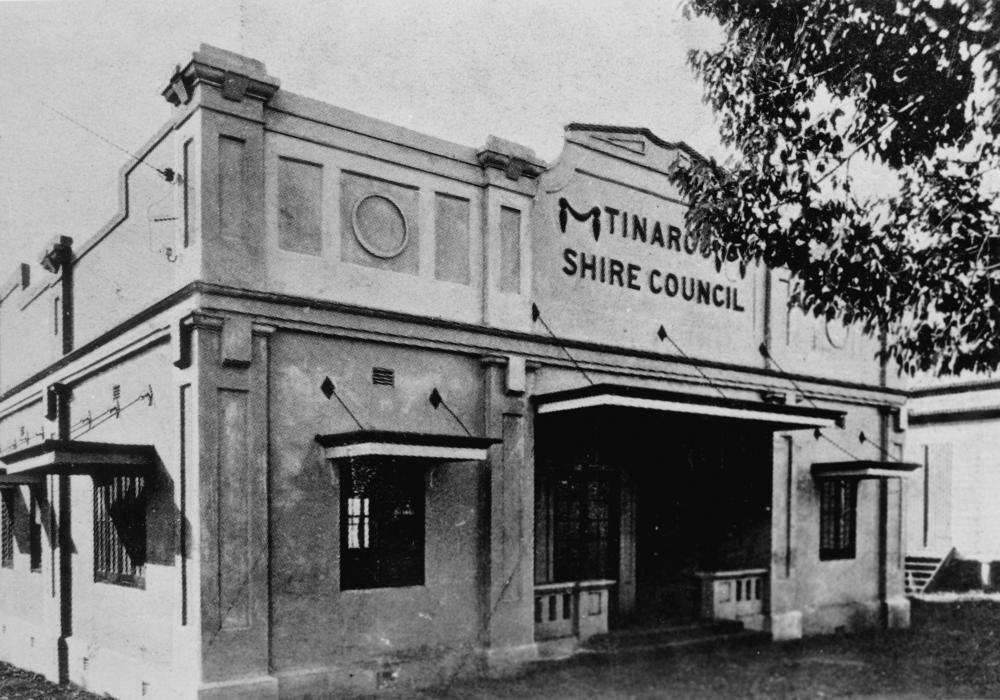
Tinaroo Shire Council Chambers in Atherton, Queensland, 1928

The Shire of Atherton included the following settlements:

- Atherton
- Barrine
- Carrington
- Kairi
- Lake Tinaroo
- Tinaroo
- Tolga
- Upper Barron^{1}
- Walkamin
- Wongabel

^{1} - split with the former Shire of Eacham

== Population ==
Year	Population
1933	3,962
1947	4,335
1954	5,401
1961	5,806
1966	5,311
1971	5,638
1976	6,240
1981	7,501
1986	8,518
1991	9,518
1996	10,119
2001	10,509
2006	10,912

== Chairmen and mayors ==
- 1884: Mr Selig
- 1906: T. Swan
- 1908: Thomas Rose
- 1927: Fred Gran
- 1988–2008: Jim Chapman

Other notable council members include:

- 1916—1917: Harold Henry Collins, Member of the Queensland Legislative Assembly for the electorates of Cook and Tablelands
