= North Johnstone, Queensland =

North Johnstone
- Suburb
- Interactive map of North Johnstone
- Coordinates: 17.3338°S 145.6630°E
- Country: Australia
- State: Queensland
- LGA: Tablelands Region
- Location: 9.9 km (6.2 mi) ENE of Malanda; 25.7 km (16.0 mi) SE of Atherton; 72.7 km (45.2 mi) SSW of Cairns; 1,689 km (1,049 mi) NNW of Brisbane

Government
  - State electorate: Hill
  - Federal division: Kennedy

Area
  - Total: 11.4 km^{2} (4.4 sq mi)

Population
  - Total: 67 (2021 census)
  - Density: 5.88/km^{2} (15.22/sq mi)
- Time zone: UTC+10:00 (AEST)
- Postcode: 4885
Suburbs around North Johnstone
Lake Eacham	Lake Eacham	Butchers Creek
Malanda	North Johnstone	Butchers Creek
Malanda	Glen Allyn	Butchers Creek

North Johnstone is a rural locality in the Tablelands Region, Queensland, Australia. In the 2021 census, North Johnstone had a population of 67 people.

== Geography ==
North Johnstone is on the Atherton Tableland and is north of the Johnstone River, which may be the origin of its name.

The predominant land use is grazing on native vegetation.

== Demographics ==
In the 2016 census, North Johnstone had a population of 77 people.

In the 2021 census, North Johnstone had a population of 67 people.

== Education ==
There are no schools in North Johnstone. The nearest government primary school is Butchers Creek State School in neighbouring Butchers Creek to the south-east. The nearest government secondary school is Malanda State High School in Malanda to the south-west.
