= Lake Eacham, Queensland =

Lake Eacham
- Suburb
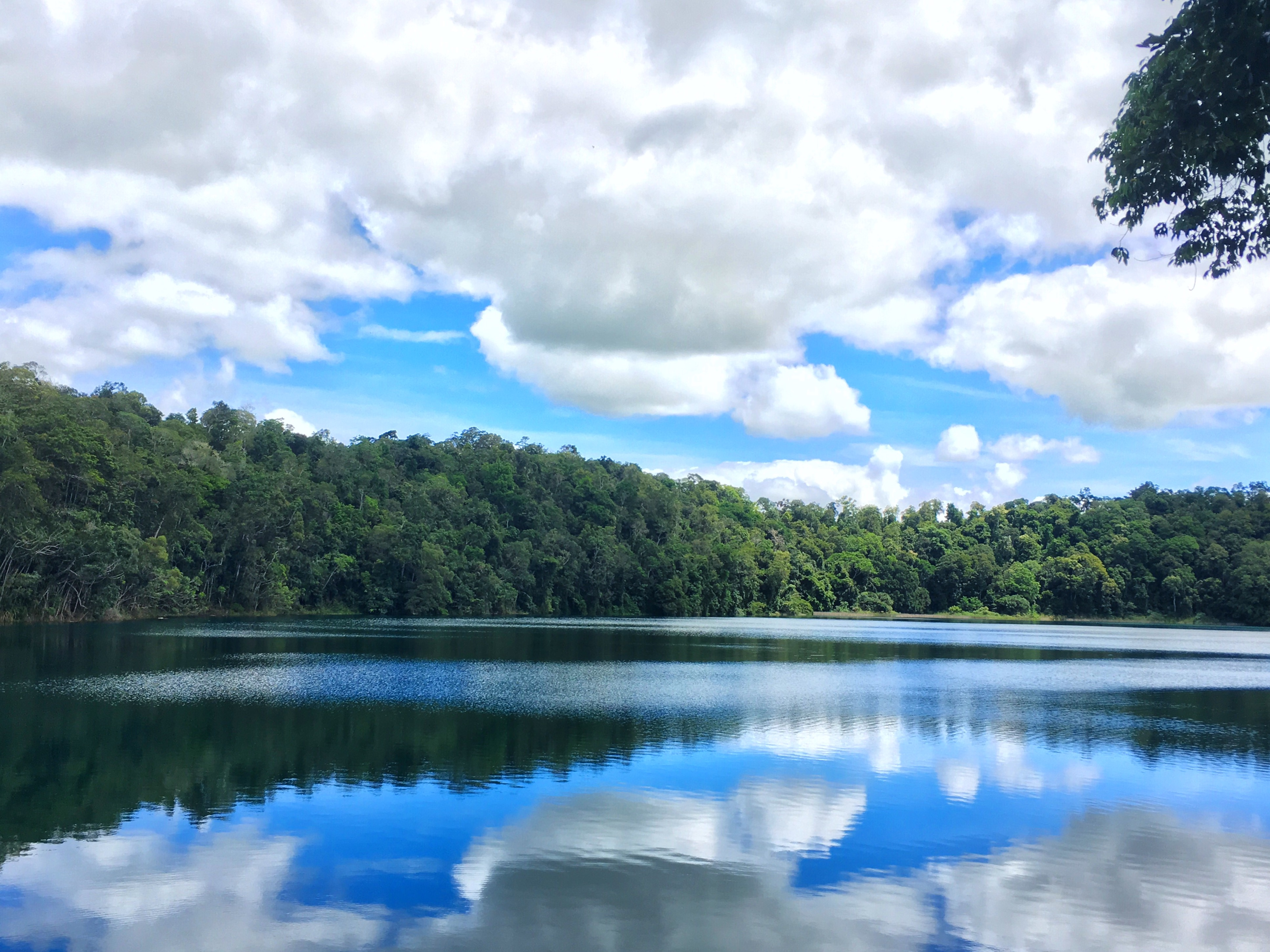
- Reflections in Lake Eacham

- Interactive map of Lake Eacham
- Coordinates: 17.3027°S 145.6452°E
- Country: Australia
- State: Queensland
- LGA: Tablelands Region
- Location: 11.5 km (7.1 mi) NNE of Malanda; 19.4 km (12.1 mi) E of Atherton; 65.6 km (40.8 mi) SW of Cairns; 1,704 km (1,059 mi) NNW of Brisbane

Government
  - State electorate: Hill
  - Federal division: Kennedy

Area
  - Total: 30.8 km^{2} (11.9 sq mi)

Population
  - Total: 459 (2021 census)
  - Density: 14.90/km^{2} (38.60/sq mi)
- Time zone: UTC+10:00 (AEST)
- Postcode: 4884
Suburbs around Lake Eacham
Yungaburra	Lake Barrine	Gadgarra
Peeramon	Lake Eacham	Gadgarra
Malanda	North Johnstone	Butchers Creek

Lake Eacham is a rural locality in the Tablelands Region, Queensland, Australia. In the 2021 census, Lake Eacham had a population of 459 people.

== Geography ==
The locality is bounded to the west and south-west by Lake Barrine Road and to the south-east by Malanda Creek.

The locality presumably takes its name from the waterbody Lake Eacham in the north-west of the locality (17.2845°S 145.6252°E). The name of the lake is believed to be an Aboriginal word ''yeetcham'' meaning ''big spring''. The lake and its surrounds are within the Crater Lakes National Park.

There is rural residential housing to the south and east of the national park. However, the predominant land use in the locality is grazing on native vegetation.

== History ==
The land in the area was surveyed in 1886 with farm lots being offered for sale in 1889.

Lake Eacham State School opened in 1911. It was built by the Sydes Brothers, who were chosen from the tenders called in September 1910. A teacher's residence was built in 1917. In 1919, it was renamed Peeramon State School. It closed in 1959. It was at 107 Mckenzie Road (corner Peeramon School Road, 17.3099°S 145.6239°E) in neighbouring Peeramon.

== Demographics ==
In the 2016 census, Lake Eacham had a population of 457 people.

In the 2021 census, Lake Eacham had a population of 459 people.

== Education ==
There are no schools in Lake Eacham. The nearest government primary schools are Yungaburra State School in neighbouring Yungaburra to the north-west, Malanda State School in neighbouring Malanda to south-west, and Butchers Creek State School in neighbouring Butchers Creek to the south-east. The nearest government secondary school is Malanda State High School in Malanda.

== Attractions ==
Lake Eacham has a day use area with a lookout on Lakes Drive (17.2862°S 145.6287°E). It is the start and finish of a circuit walking track around the lake.
