= Malanda Falls =

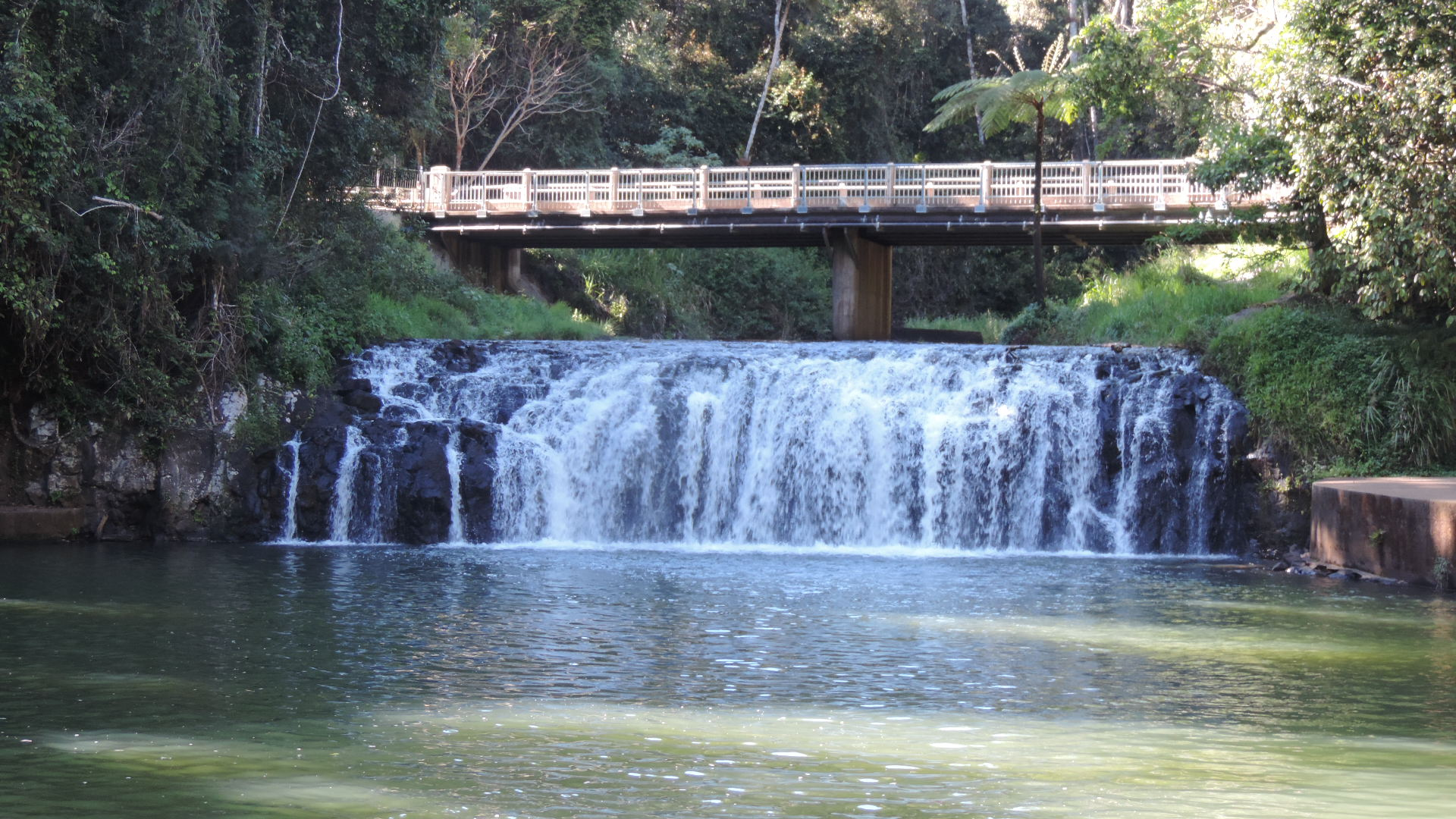
- Malanda Falls, 2016

- Location within Queensland
- Location: Far North Queensland, Australia
- Coordinates: 17°21′18″S 145°35′11″E
- Type: Cascade
- Number of drops: 1
- Watercourse: North Johnstone River

The Malanda Falls is a cascade waterfall on the North Johnstone River, located in the Tablelands Region in the Far North of Queensland, Australia.

== Location and features ==
The falls are situated on the Atherton Tableland, near the town of Malanda. They are within the Malanda Falls Conservation Park. The North Johnstone River is prone to significant flooding in the wet season. There are two 20-minute walks in the surrounding rainforest, with a chance of seeing a tree kangaroo. The visitor centre books guided walks with aboriginal guides. It also has displays on the rainforest, geology and history of Malanda. The visitor centre and museum burnt down in 2010 and was rebuilt in 2013.

The swimming pool and associated infrastructure is very popular with locals and tourists. The Malanda Falls Swimming Pool is listed on the Queensland Heritage Register as an early example of tourist infrastructure in North Queensland.

== See also ==
- List of waterfalls
- List of waterfalls in Australia
