= Glen Allyn =

- Suburb
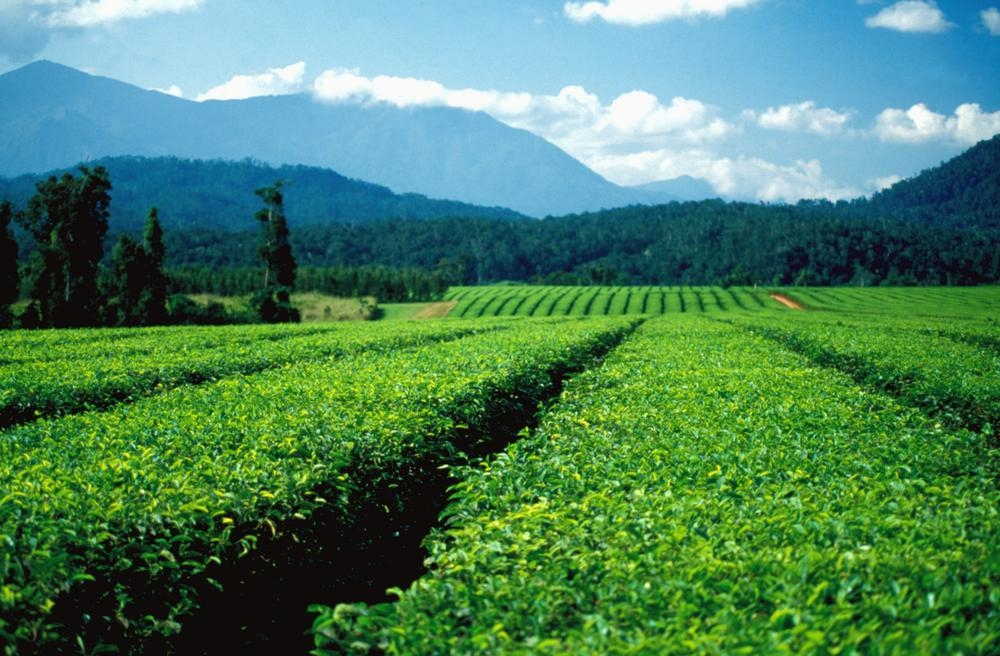
- Nerada Tea Plantation at Glen Allyn on the Atherton Tableland, 1986

- Interactive map of Glen Allyn
- Coordinates: 17.3783°S 145.6608°E
- Country: Australia
- State: Queensland
- LGA: Tablelands Region
- Location: 13.1 km (8.1 mi) SE of Malanda; 32.0 km (19.9 mi) SE of Atherton; 83.4 km (51.8 mi) SSW of Cairns; 1,700 km (1,100 mi) NNW of Brisbane

Government
  - State electorate: Hill
  - Federal division: Kennedy

Area
  - Total: 40.4 km^{2} (15.6 sq mi)

Population
  - Total: 109 (2021 census)
  - Density: 2.698/km^{2} (6.99/sq mi)
- Time zone: UTC+10:00 (AEST)
- Postcode: 4885
Suburbs around Glen Allyn
Malanda	North Johnstone	Butchers Creek
Malanda	Glen Allyn	Topaz
Jaggan	Tarzali	Wooroonooran

Glen Allyn is a rural locality in the Tablelands Region, Queensland, Australia. In the 2021 census, Glen Allyn had a population of 109 people.

== Geography ==
Lamins Hill is a mountain near the eastern edge of the locality (17.3796°S 145.7049°E) 876 metres (2,874 ft) above sea level.

== History ==
Glen Allyn State School opened on 1 September 1920 and closed in 1965. It was on the western side of Glen Allyn Road (approx 17.38471°S 145.66526°E).

== Demographics ==
In the 2016 census, Glen Allyn had a population of 157 people.

In the 2021 census, Glen Allyn had a population of 109 people.

== Education ==
There are no schools in Glen Allyn. The nearest government primary schools are Malanda State School in neighbouring Malanda to the west and Butchers Creek State School in neighbouring Butchers Creek to the north-east. The nearest government secondary school is Malanda State High School, also in Malanda.

== Attractions ==
The Nerada Tea plantation and factory are at 933 Glen Allyn Road (17.3835°S 145.6672°E). The company is Australian's largest tea producer.

Lamins Hill Lookout is on the Old Cairns Track off Topaz Road (17.3770°S 145.7051°E).
