= Peeramon =

- Town
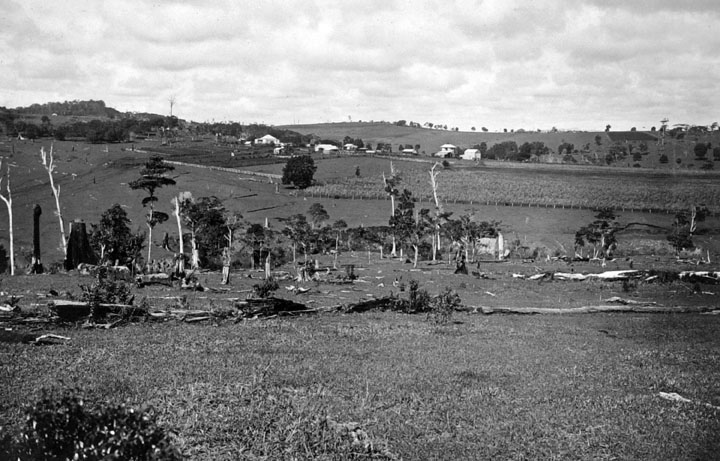
- Mr R Campbell's Dairy, Peeramon, circa 1935

- Interactive map of Peeramon
- Coordinates: 17.3097°S 145.6119°E
- Country: Australia
- State: Queensland
- LGA: Tablelands Region
- Location: 5.3 km (3.3 mi) NE of Malanda; 17.4 km (10.8 mi) SE of Atherton; 70 km (43 mi) SW of Cairns; 1,670 km (1,040 mi) NNW of Brisbane

Government
  - State electorate: Hill
  - Federal division: Kennedy

Area
  - Total: 28.4 km^{2} (11.0 sq mi)

Population
  - Total: 778 (2021 census)
  - Density: 27.39/km^{2} (70.95/sq mi)
- Time zone: UTC+10:00 (AEST)
- Postcode: 4885
Localities around Peeramon
East Barron	Yungaburra	Lake Eacham
Upper Barron	Peeramon	Lake Eacham
Kureen	Kureen	Malanda

Peeramon is a rural town and locality in the Tablelands Region, Queensland, Australia. In the 2021 census, the locality of Peeramon had a population of 778 people.

== Geography ==
The locality is bounded to the east by Lake Barrine Road and to the south-east by the Johnstone River.

There are a number of neighbourhoods in Peeramon (from north-west to south-east):

- Chumbrumba (17.3°S 145.5833°E), taking its name from a railway station, named by the Queensland Railways Department on 25 April 1910, using an Aboriginal name for a forest near the railway station
- Weerimba (17.3°S 145.6°E), another railway station name from 14 October 1911, using an Aboriginal name for the tooth billed bower bird
- Tula (17.3166°S 145.6166°E), another railway station named on 14 October 1911, using an Aboriginal name for a species of possum

Mount Quincan (17.3007°S 145.5772°E) is in the north-west of the locality and rises to 889 metres (2,917 ft) above sea level.

== History ==
The town's name is an Aboriginal word, referring to a local hill. The name was assigned by the Queensland Railways Department on 25 April 1910.

Lake Eacham State School opened in 1911. It was built by the Sydes Brothers, who were chosen from the tenders called in September 1910. A teacher's residence was built in 1917. In 1919, it was renamed Peeramon State School. It closed in 1959. It was at 107 Mckenzie Road (corner Peeramon School Road, 17.3099°S 145.6239°E).

The Millaa Millaa branch railway opened from Yungaburra to Kureen (via Peeramon) on 18 October 1910.

The Peeramon Hotel was once a siding for the Tolga-Millaa Millaa railway. Today the solitary pub is the only reminder of a once-thriving town which was surveyed in 1907. The publican has a collection of antique telephones. The hotel suffered some serious damage from Cyclone Larry in March 2006.

The Peeramon Methodist Church opened on Thursday 1 August 1918.

== Demographics ==
In the 2016 census, the locality of Peeramon had a population of 628 people.

In the 2021 census, the locality of Peeramon had a population of 778 people.

== Education ==
There are no schools in Peeramon. The nearest government primary schools are Yunaburra State School in neighbouring Yungaburra to the north and Malanda State School in neighbouring Malanda to the south. The nearest government secondary school is Malanda State High School in Malanda.
