= Tablelands Region =

Coordinates: 16°59′48″S 145°23′59″E

- Local government area
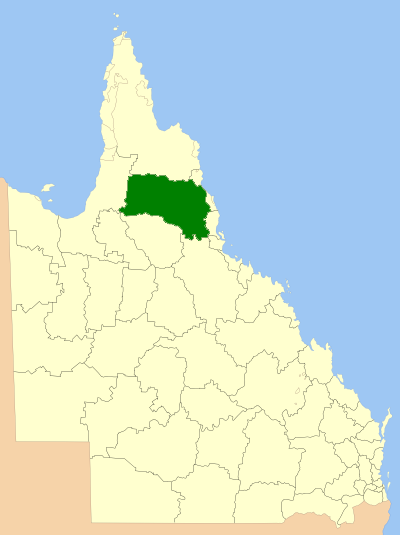
- Location within Queensland, 2013, prior to de-amalgamation of Shire of Mareeba

- Interactive map of Tablelands Region
- Country: Australia
- State: Queensland
- Region: Far North Queensland
- Established: 2008
- Council seat: Atherton

Government
  - Mayor: Rodney Donald Marti
  - State electorates: Cook; Barron River; Hill
  - Federal division: Kennedy

Area
  - Total: 11,293 km^{2} (4,360 sq mi)

Population
  - Total: 26,244 (2021 census)
  - Density: 2.32392/km^{2} (6.0189/sq mi)
- Website: Tablelands Region
LGAs around Tablelands Region
Mareeba	Mareeba	Cairns
Mareeba	Tablelands Region	Cairns
Etheridge	Charters Towers	Cassowary Coast, Hinchinbrook

The Tablelands Region is a local government area in Far North Queensland, Australia inland from the city of Cairns. Established in 2008, it was preceded by four previous local government areas which dated back more than a century. On 1 January 2014, one of those local government areas, the Shire of Mareeba, was re-established independent of the Tablelands Region.

It has an estimated operating budget of A$62.2 million.

In the 2021 census, the Tablelands Region had a population of 26,244 people.

== History ==
Yidinji (also known as Yidinj, Yidiny, and Idindji) is an Australian Aboriginal language. Its traditional language region is within the local government areas of Cairns Region and Tablelands Region, in such localities as Cairns, Gordonvale, and the Mulgrave River, and the southern part of the Atherton Tableland including Atherton and Kairi.

Prior to the 2008 amalgamation, the Tablelands Region consisted the entire area of four previous local government areas:

- the Shire of Atherton;
- the Shire of Eacham;
- the Shire of Herberton; and
- the Shire of Mareeba.

On 11 November 1879, when the Divisional Boards Act 1879 came into effect proclaiming 74 divisions around Queensland, the nature and distribution of the population in the Tablelands region was vastly different from today. Most of the area was divided between the Hinchinbrook and Woothakata divisions. On 3 September 1881, Tinaroo Division was proclaimed from part of Hinchinbrook, making the mining towns of Tinaroo and Thornborough the administrative centres of the region.

A number of changes occurred from that point:

- 15 September 1888 – Formation of the Borough of Herberton to manage the town of Herberton
- 14 May 1889 – Walsh Division (Irvinebank) separated from Woothakata
- 20 December 1890 – Barron Division separated from Tinaroo
- 11 May 1895 – Herberton Division separated from Tinaroo; amalgamated the Borough
- 31 March 1903 – Under the Local Authorities Act 1902, Barron, Herberton, Tinaroo, Walsh and Woothakata became Shires.
- 16 December 1908 – Shire of Chillagoe formed from part of Woothakata
- 18 November 1910 – Shire of Eacham formed from part of Tinaroo
- 20 December 1919 – Shire of Barron abolished and divided between Mulgrave and Woothakata
- 1933 – Shires of Walsh and Chillagoe amalgamated into Woothakata
- 1935 – Shire of Tinaroo renamed Shire of Atherton
- 20 December 1947 – Shire of Woothakata renamed Shire of Mareeba

In July 2007, the Local Government Reform Commission released its report and recommended that the four areas amalgamate. Amongst its reasons given for this recommendation were that a community of interest revolved around the towns of Mareeba and Atherton, with residents travelling to Cairns for services not offered in the region. The opportunity for tourism and leisure promotion under a single banner, the close proximity of most major towns, the lack of natural barriers and similar economic interests including beef, dairy, fruit and sugar production. All councils opposed the amalgamation, although Atherton, Herberton and Eacham were willing to consider shared service delivery. On 15 March 2008, the Shires formally ceased to exist, and elections were held on the same day to elect councillors and a to the Regional Council.

In 2012, a proposal was made to de-amalgamate the Shire of Mareeba from the Tablelands Region. On 9 March 2013, the citizens of the former Mareeba shire voted in a referendum to de-amalgamate. The Shire of Mareeba was re-established on 1 January 2014.

== Wards and councillors ==
Tablelands Regional Council consists of:

- Mayor: Rodney Donald (Rod) Marti
- Division 1 Councillor: Kevin Cardew
- Division 2 Councillor: Annette Haydon
- Division 3 Councillor: Dave Bilney
- Division 4 Councillor: Maree Baade
- Division 5 Councillor: Con Spanos
- Division 6 Councillor: Kylie Lang

== Mayors ==
- 2008–2012: Tom Gilmore
- 2012–2016: Rosa Lee Long
- 2016–2020: Joe Paronella
- 2020–present: Rod Marti

== Towns and localities ==
The Tablelands Region includes the following settlements:

Atherton area:

- Atherton
- Barrine
- Carrington
- Kairi
- Lake Tinaroo
- Tinaroo
- Tolga
- Upper Barron
- Walkamin
- Wongabel

Eacham area:

- Malanda
- Yungaburra
- Butchers Creek
- Glen Allyn
- Jaggan
- Lake Eacham
- Maalan
- Millaa Millaa
- North Johnstone
- Palmerston^{1}
- Peeramon
- Tarzali

Herberton area:

- Herberton
- Evelyn
- Innot Hot Springs
- Kalunga
- Millstream
- Moomin
- Mount Garnet
- Ravenshoe
- Tumoulin
- Wairuna
- Wondecla

Others:

- Beatrice
- Danbulla
- East Barron
- Ellinjaa
- Gadgarra
- Glen Ruth
- Gunnawarra
- Kaban
- Kingsborough
- Kirrama
- Koombooloomba
- Kureen
- Lake Barrine
- Middlebrook
- Minbun
- Minnamoolka
- Moregatta
- Mungalli
- Silver Valley
- Topaz
- Wooroonooran^{2}

^{1} - shared with Cassowary Coast Region
^{2} - shared with Cairns Region and Cassowary Coast Region

== Demographics ==
The populations given relate to the component entities prior to 2008. The 2011 census was the first for the Tablelands Region.

Year	Population (Region total)	Population (Mareeba)	Population (Atherton)	Population (Herberton)	Population (Eacham)	Notes
1933	19,386	8,248	3,962	2,852	4,324	
1947	17,585	6,312	4,335	3,198	3,740	
1954	20,917	7,595	5,401	4,150	3,771	
1961	23,675	10,212	5,806	3,815	3,842	
1966	23,332	10,789	5,311	3,634	3,598	
1971	24,367	11,676	5,638	3,726	3,327	
1976	25,488	12,136	6,240	3,679	3,433	
1981	29,329	14,003	7,501	3,688	4,137	
1986	33,426	15,563	8,518	4,210	5,135	
1991	36,816	17,129	9,518	4,560	5,609	
1996	39,350	18,044	10,119	5,113	6,074	
2001	39,629	17,961	10,509	5,083	6,076	
2006	40,906	18,212	10,912	5,423	6,359	
2011 census	43,727					
2016 census	24,827	Following the deamalgation of the Shire of Mareeba.				
2021 census	26,244					

In the 2021 census, the Tablelands Region had a population of 26,244 people. 38.3% described their ancestry as English. This is followed by 37.1% who described their ancestry as Australian, then Irish (12.5%), Scottish (10.7%) and Australian Aboriginal at 6.8%. 85.1% spoke only English at home followed by the next most common languages: 0.7% German, 0.6% Italian, 0.3% Bislama, 0.3% Dutch and 0.2% Japanese. Indigenous Australians were listed as making up 7.9% of the Mareeba shire population.

== Libraries ==
The Tablelands Regional Council operate public libraries in Atherton, Herberton, Malanda, Millaa Millaa, Mount Garnet, Ravenshoe and Yungaburra.
