= Malanda, Queensland =

Malanda
- Town
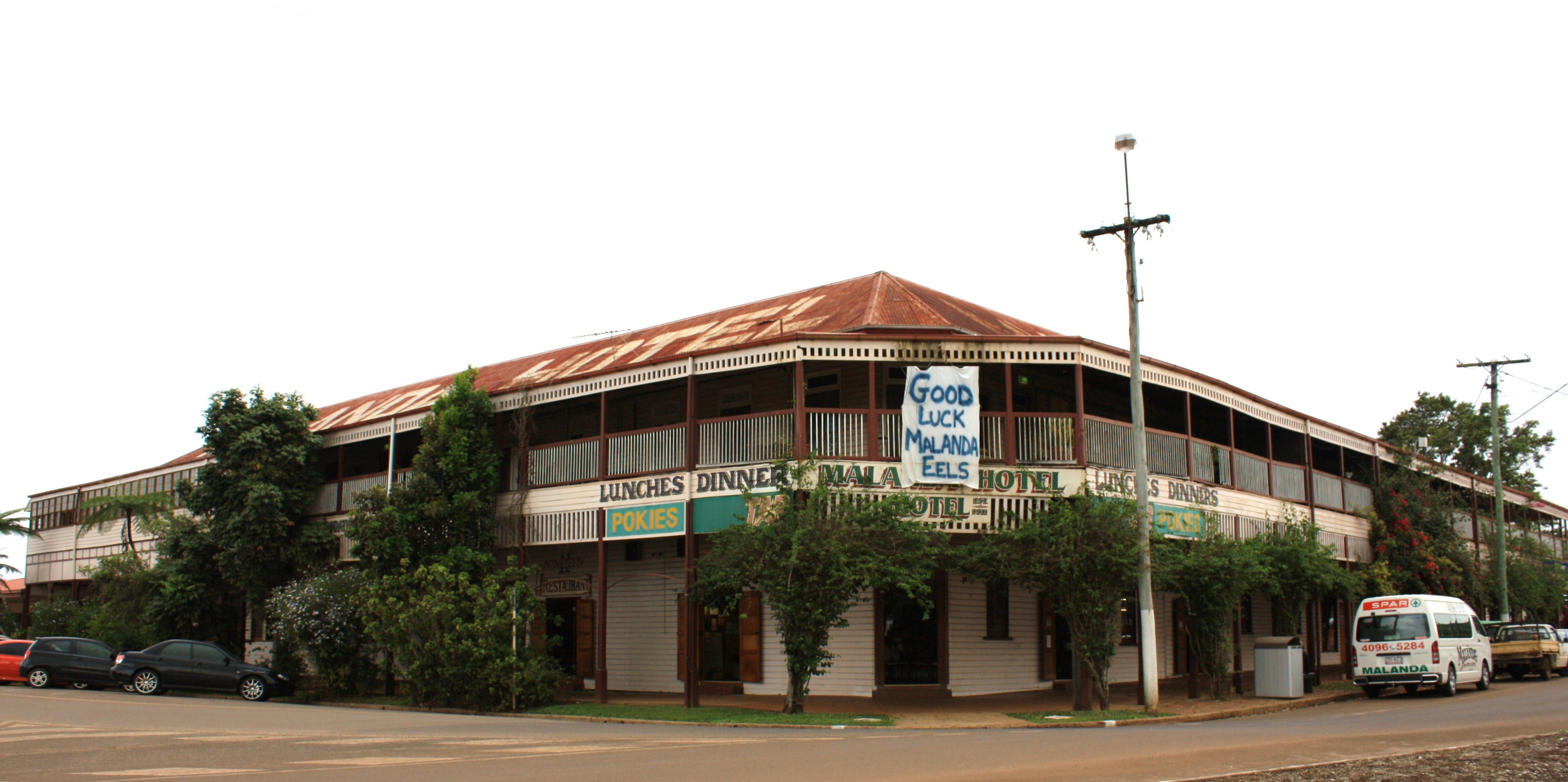
- Malanda Hotel

- Interactive map of Malanda
- Coordinates: 17.355°S 145.5958°E
- Country: Australia
- State: Queensland
- LGA: Tablelands Region
- Location: 19.9 km (12.4 mi) SE of Atherton; 76.7 km (47.7 mi) SW of Cairns; 332 km (206 mi) NNW of Townsville; 1,746 km (1,085 mi) NNW of Brisbane
- Established: 1908

Government
  - State electorate: Hill
  - Federal division: Kennedy

Area
  - Total: 44.7 km^{2} (17.3 sq mi)
- Elevation: 732 m (2,402 ft)

Population
  - Total: 2,000 (2021 census)
  - Density: 45/km^{2} (116/sq mi)
- Time zone: UTC+10:00 (AEST)
- Postcode: 4885
Localities around Malanda
Kureen	Peeramon	Lake Eacham
Upper Barron	Malanda	North Johnstone
Upper Barron	Jaggan	Glen Allyn

Malanda /məˈlændə/ is a rural town and locality in the Tablelands Region, Queensland, Australia. In the 2021 census, the locality of Malanda had a population of 2,000. The economy is based upon agriculture (particularly dairy) and tourism.

== Geography ==
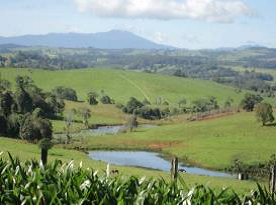
Rivers and lakes, Malanda, 2024

Malanda is on the Atherton Tableland in Far North Queensland, 85 kilometres (53 mi) from Cairns and 732 metres (2,402 ft) above sea level. The town is located downstream of the Malanda Falls on the North Johnstone River.

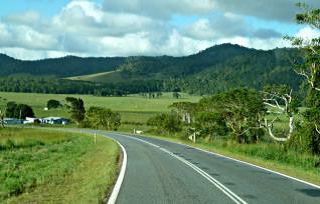
Farms and rainforest, Malanda, 2024

The northern entrance to the town passes the Malanda Falls. In comparison to the gorges of the escarpment the falls were created by the last flow of lava from the Malanda Shield Volcano with a cascade of roughly 4 metres.

== History ==
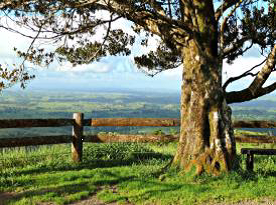
Malanda landscape, 2024

Malanda formed part of Ngajanji territory.

The discovery of tin at Herberton resulted in miners passing through the area from the coast to Herberton, opening up the district.

The district was first known as Tutamoulin, but was changed to avoid confusion with Tumoulin, also on the Atherton Tableland. The name Malanda comes from Malanda Creek, and is believed to be an Aboriginal name for the Upper Johnstone River, with the suggested meaning little stream with big stones or running rivers.

In 1886, a decision was made to build a railway into the area. Over 3,412 kilometres (2,120 mi) of railway was installed into the region over the next six years. By 1890, the Tablelands railway line had reached Kuranda. It pushed on to Mareeba in 1893 and Atherton in 1903 and did not reach Malanda until 1911. The line closed in 1964.

In 1908, James English (later the publican of the Malanda Hotel and father of Charles English) and James Emerson moved into the area and saw the potential for a dairy industry. English brought cattle from Kiama and the Richmond River areas in New South Wales and Emerson had a herd of 1,026 cattle overlanded from Lismore. The cattle took 16 months to reach Malanda and only 560 survived the journey. However, the industry grew and by 1919 Malanda had its own butter factory. In 1973 this amalgamated with the factory in Millaa Millaa to form the Atherton Tablelands Co-operative Dairy Association.

John Prince established a sawmill in 1910 in Malanda. It provided the timber to construct the Malanda Hotel in 1911.

Malanda Post Office opened by January 1912 (a receiving office had been open from 1911).

The Malanda parish of the Roman Catholic Diocese of Cairns was established in 1959.

Malanda State School opened on 4 August 1913. From 1949 until 1961, it also offered secondary education, until Malanda State High School opened on 23 January 1961.

The first Malanda Show took place on 6–7 September 1916 on land belonging to James English, with 1000 people attending the show on the second day.

The Malanda Library and Customer Service Centre building opened in 1990.

== Demographics ==
In the 2021 census, the locality of Malanda had a population of 2,000.

In the 2016 census, the locality of Malanda had a population of 1,985.

In the 2011 census, the locality of Malanda had a population of 2,052.

In the 2006 census, the town of Malanda had a population of 1,009.

== Heritage listings ==
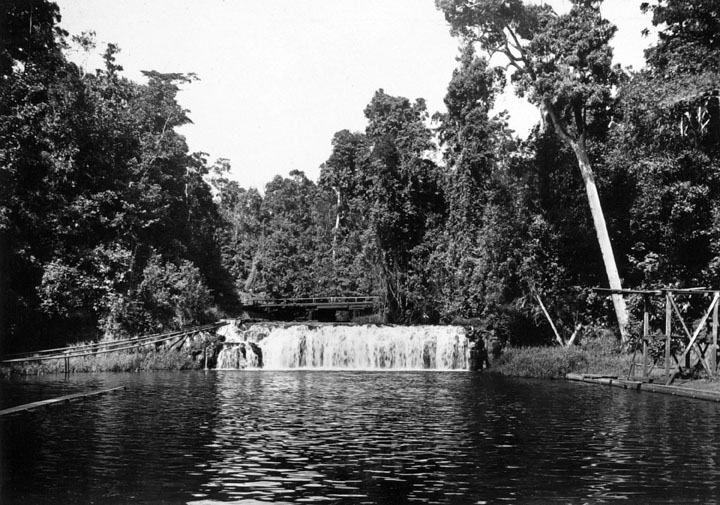
Malanda Falls and Swimming Pool, circa 1935

Malanda has a number of heritage-listed sites, including:

- Majestic Picture Theatre, 1 Eacham Place
- Malanda Falls Swimming Pool, Malanda Falls Park
- St James Catholic Church, Monash Ave

== Economy ==
Malanda produces milk and cheese. Local promoters, noting that Malanda milk is sold in the Northern Territory and as far north as Weipa, declared Malanda to be 'the headquarters for one of the largest and longest milk runs in the world'. The milk is also exported to Indonesia and Malaysia. Malanda Milk is now a part of Dairy Farmers, but with a shorter milk run, only as far south as Mackay and as far north as Darwin.

== Education ==
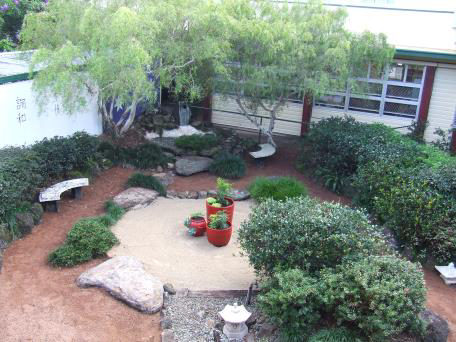
Japanese Gardens at Malanda State High School, 2024

Malanda State School is a government primary (Prep–6) school for boys and girls at 24 Mary Street (17.3489°S 145.5946°E). In 2017, the school had an enrolment of 351 students with 23 teachers (21 full-time equivalent) and 17 non-teaching staff (11 full-time equivalent). In 2018, the school had an enrolment of 380 students with 26 teachers (24 full-time equivalent) and 18 non-teaching staff (12 full-time equivalent). It includes a special education program.

Malanda State High School is a government secondary (7–12) school for boys and girls at Memorial Drive (17.3590°S 145.5934°E). In 2017, the school had an enrolment of 368 students with 34 teachers (33 full-time equivalent) and 25 non-teaching staff (18 full-time equivalent). In 2018, the school had an enrolment of 418 students with 38 teachers (37 full-time equivalent) and 29 non-teaching staff (20 full-time equivalent). It includes a special education program.

== Amenities ==
Tablelands Regional Council operates the Malanda Library at 31 James Street, Malanda. It is open Tuesday to Saturday.

The Malanda branch of the Queensland Country Women's Association meets at the QCWA Hall at 3 Elizabeth Street.

St James' Catholic Church is at 7 Monash Avenue. It is within the Malanda Parish of the Roman Catholic Diocese of Cairns.

== Attractions ==
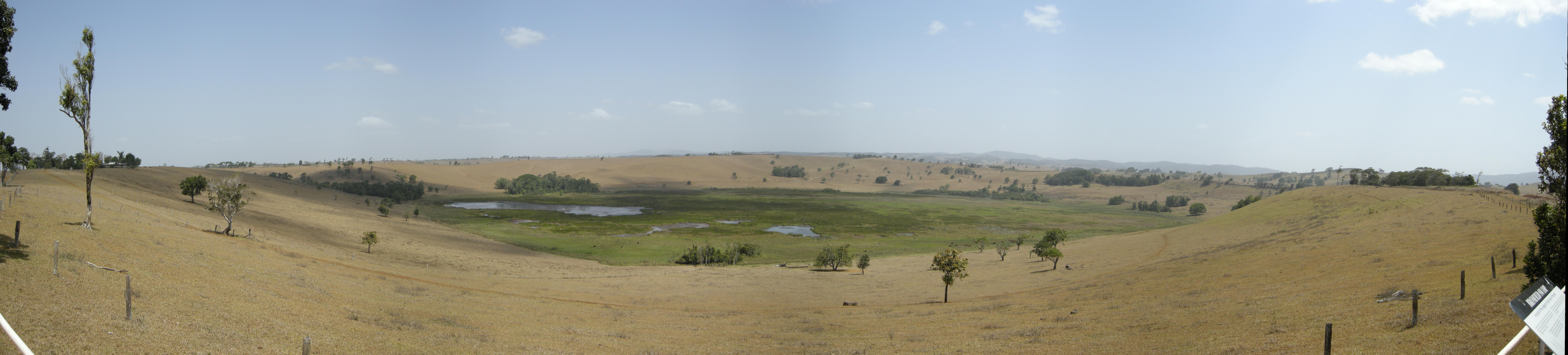
Bromfield crater and swamp, 2019

The Malanda Falls Conservation Park is just opposite the Malanda Falls. It offers a short walk through the rainforest and an opportunity to see a wide range of rainforest trees. Platypus and tree-kangaroos are some of the animals that can be seen in the conservation park.

Bromfield Swamp is part of the headwaters of the North Johnstone River. It is the crater of an extinct volcano. It is home to a population of sarus cranes.

The Malanda Mosaic Trail starts at the town library. Ten vibrant artworks commemorate the rich history of Malanda's community – the Original Inhabitants, Hardships and Struggles, Transport, Commerce, Recollections, Early Settlers, the Dairy Industry, Recreation and Looking Ahead. Close study of the individual mosaics (each of which contains a blue butterfly) reveals many details camouflaged in the intricate designs, and the handmade ceramic border tiles tell more about the theme of the central mosaic. Mosaics were made by former resident Felicity Wallis.

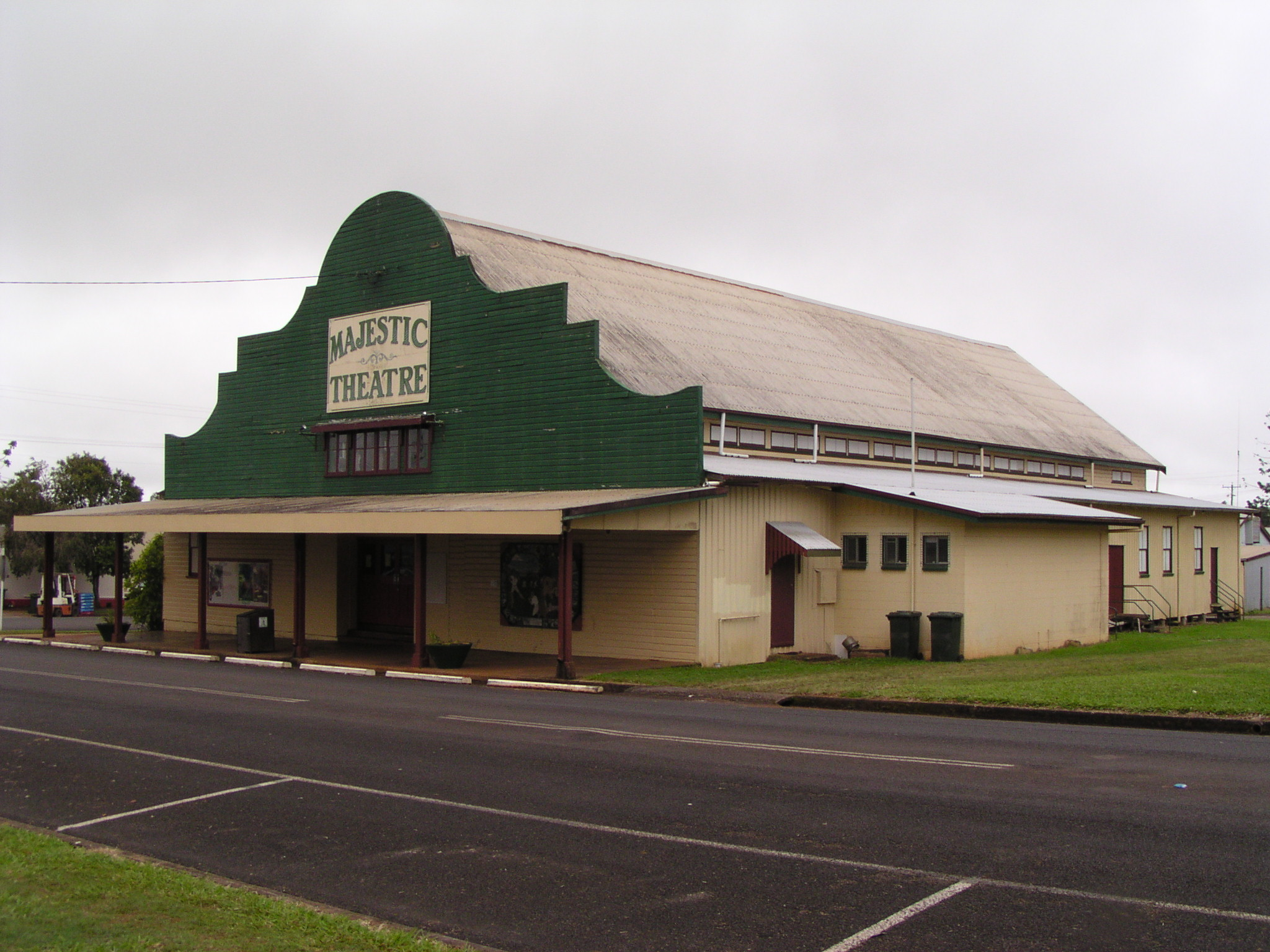
Majestic Theatre, 2006

The Majestic Theatre is said to be the oldest continually-operating cinema in Australia.

The Malanda Hotel has a grand ballroom and staircase.

The Historical Resource Centre in Elizabeth Street is the meeting room and archival repository for all printed and photographic collections of the Eacham Historical Society. It houses a comprehensive library of books pertaining to the history of North Queensland. It holds the Land Settlement Registers, which contain the names of all the first settlers in the Atherton Land Agent's District.

== Facilities ==
Despite the name, Malanda Wastewater Treatment Plant is at 228 English Road in neighbouring Kureen to the north (17.3300°S 145.6071°E).

== Notable residents ==
- Charles English, Member of the Queensland Legislative Assembly
- Jack Mundey, trade unionist and conservationist
- Shane Stefanutto, former professional football player for the Brisbane Roar and North Queensland Fury.
