= Danbulla, Queensland =

Danbulla
- Suburb
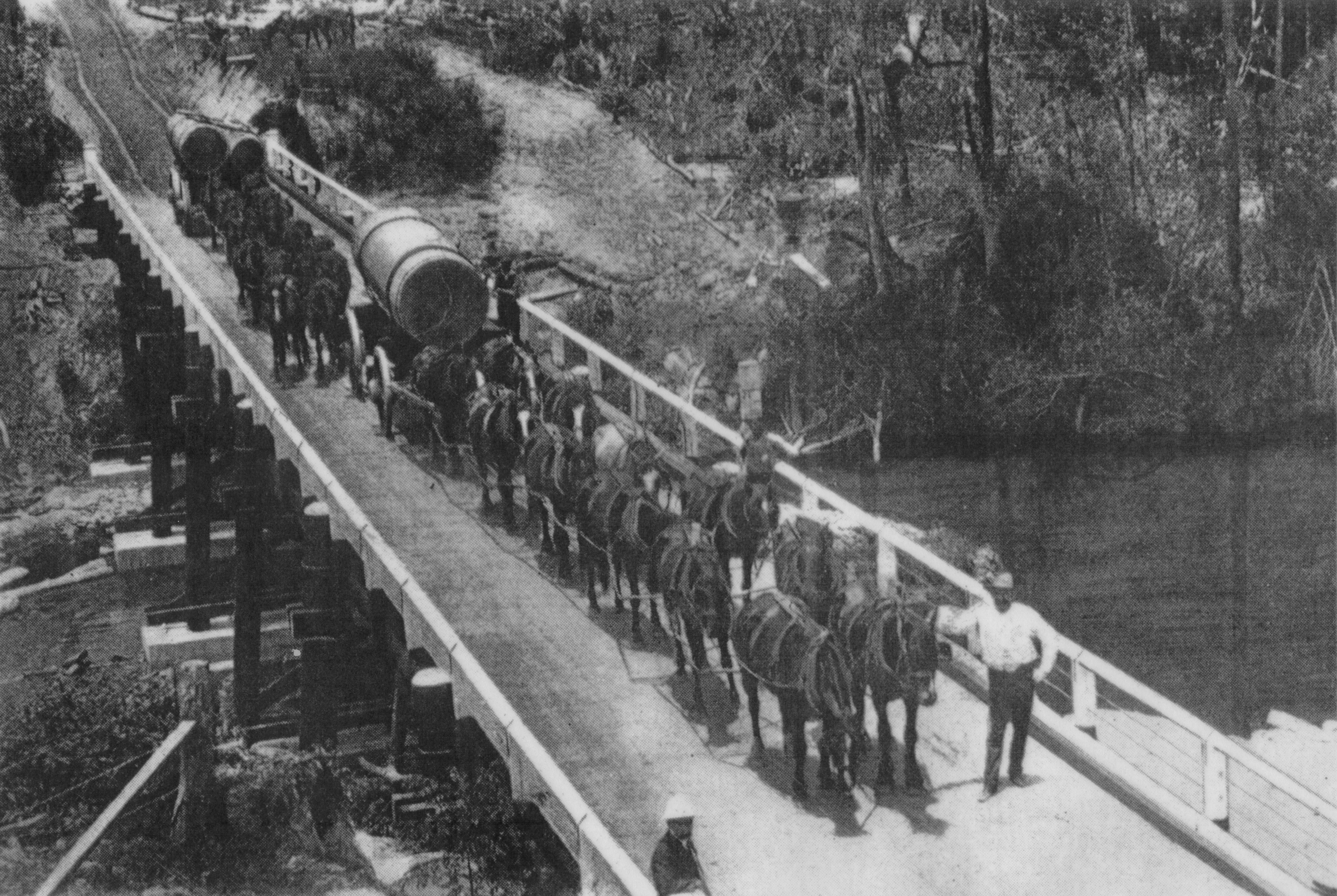
- Two horse teams carting felled logs across the Danbulla Bridge

- Interactive map of Danbulla
- Coordinates: 17.1566°S 145.6288°E
- Country: Australia
- State: Queensland
- LGA: Tablelands Region
- Location: 25.5 km (15.8 mi) NE of Malanda; 28.6 km (17.8 mi) ENE of Atherton; 56.7 km (35.2 mi) SSW of Cairns; 1,717 km (1,067 mi) NNW of Brisbane

Government
  - State electorate: Hill
  - Federal division: Kennedy

Area
  - Total: 109.1 km^{2} (42.1 sq mi)

Population
  - Total: 88 (2021 census)
  - Density: 0.807/km^{2} (2.089/sq mi)
- Time zone: UTC+10:00 (AEST)
- Postcode: 4872
Suburbs around Danbulla
Lake Tinaroo; Mareeba	Lamb Range	Lamb Range
Tinaroo	Danbulla	Lamb Range
Lake Tinaroo	Barrine	Lake Barrine; Gadgarra; Lake Tinaroo

Danbulla is a locality in the Tablelands Region, Queensland, Australia. In the 2021 census, Danbulla had a population of 88 people.

== Geography ==
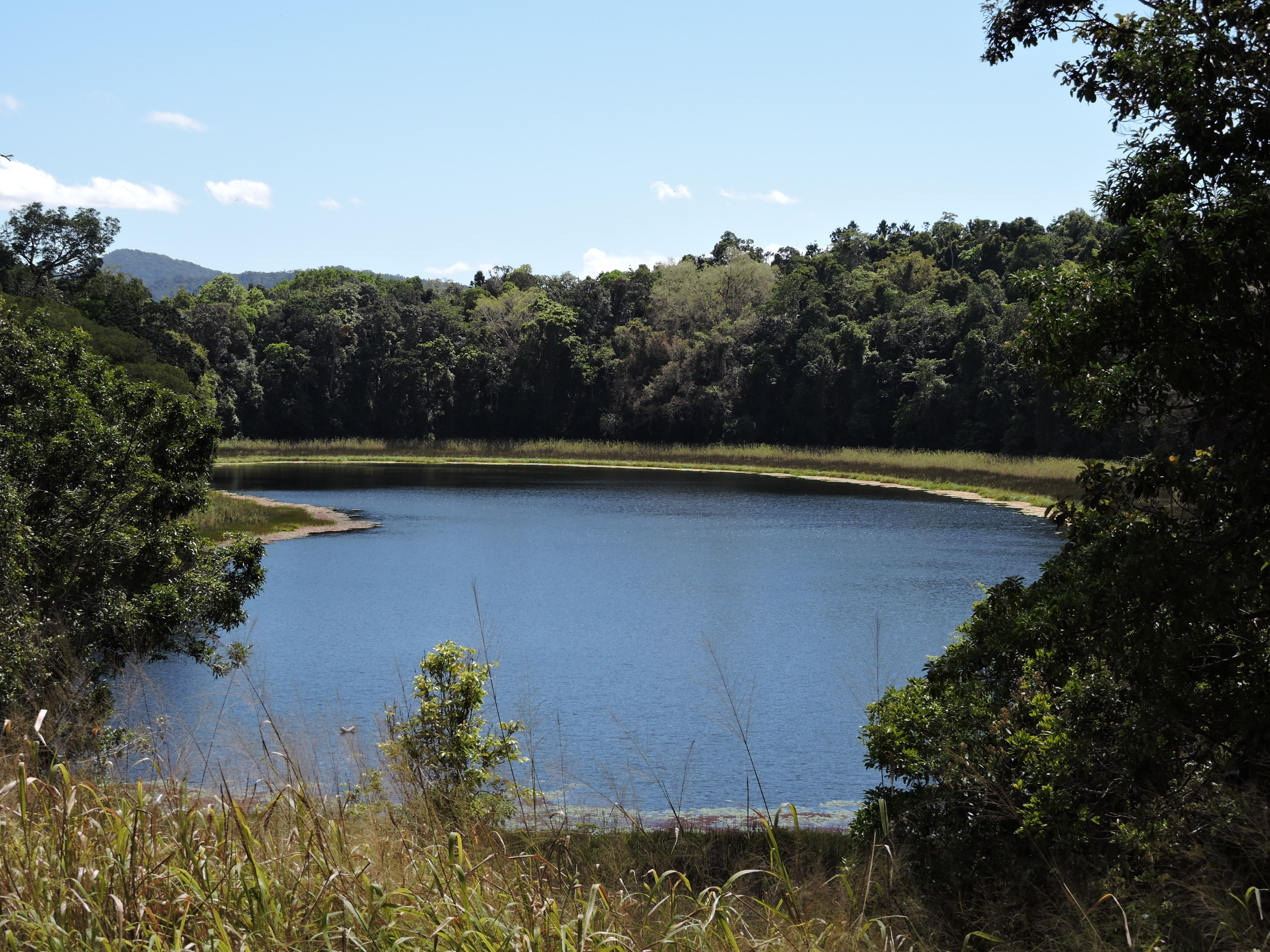
Lake Euramoo, 2015

Danbulla is on the Atherton Tableland. It is bounded to the west by Lake Tinaroo, to the north by Tinaroo Range, to the north-east and east by Lamb Range, to the south-east by Main Range, and to the south-west by Surprise Creek, a tributary of Lake Tinaroo. It is within the world-heritage-listed Wet Tropics of Queensland.

Danbulla has the following mountains, from north to south:

- Mount Edith (17.0925°S 145.6244°E) 1,149 metres (3,770 ft)
- Mount Haig (17.0946°S 145.6023°E) 1,261 metres (4,137 ft)
- Python Hill (17.1795°S 145.6076°E) 851 metres (2,792 ft)
- Abdul Hill (17.2053°S 145.6555°E) 732 metres (2,402 ft)
- Mount Nomico (17.2190°S 145.6758°E) 903 metres (2,963 ft)

Lake Euramoo is a shallow dumbbell-shaped volcanic crater lake (17.1591°S 145.6290°E).

Most of the locality is a protected area except for a small part of the south-east of the locality. The protected areas include Danbulla National Park, Danbulla State Forest, Danbulla South Forest Reserve, Gadgarra National Park and Gadgarra Forest Reserve.

The remaining land is predominantly used for grazing on native vegetation.

== History ==
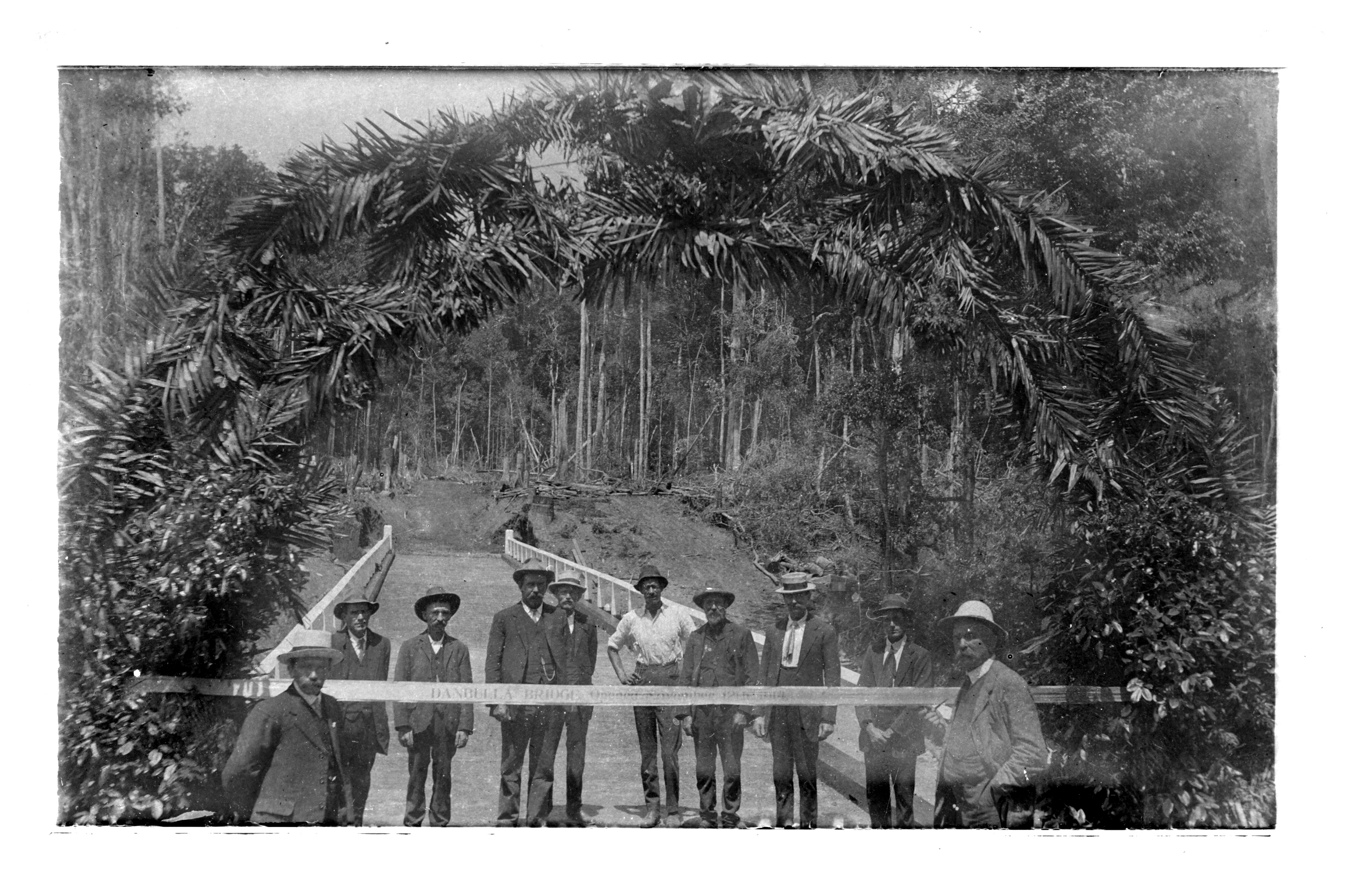
Opening of the Danbulla Bridge, 1914

Danbulla was opened up for timber-cutting and settlement following the construction of a bridge across the Barron River from Kairi in 1914.

Lake Euramoo State School opened on 19 May 1924 and closed on 31 December 1958.

Historically, Danbulla developed around Robsons Creek. At its peak during World War II, the district had a population of around 150-200 in about 50 families. Its facilities included the school, a public hall, telephone exchange and sawmill.

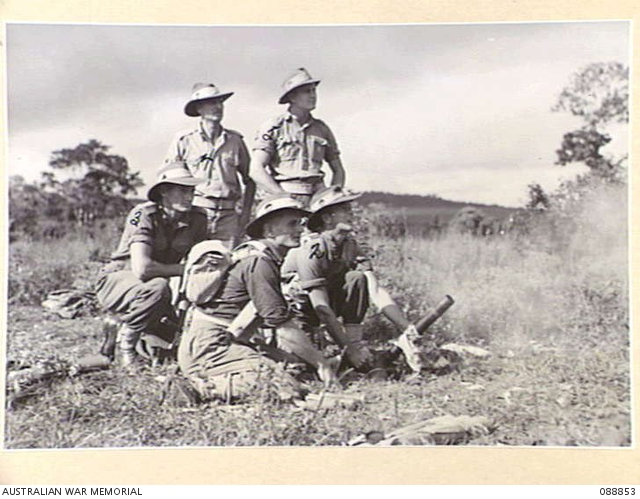
Jungle warfare training, Danbulla, 1945

During World War II, the need to repel the Japanese invasion of South-East Asia and New Guinea required troops to be trained in jungle warfare and Danbulla was selected as one of the jungle warfare training areas on the Atherton Tableland. An estimated 100,000 to 150,000 troops received training on the tableland.

After World War II, Danbulla farmers experienced problems with drought, poor soil, and the transport to the milk factory in Malanda. The construction of the Tinaroo Dam to impound the Barron River resulted in the inundation of Dunbulla's farms and facilities. Most people had moved away by the time the dam opened in 1958.

== Demographics ==
In the 2016 census, Danbulla had a population of 47 people.

In the 2021 census, Danbulla had a population of 88 people.

== Education ==
There are no schools in Danbulla. The nearest government primary schools are Kairi State School in Kairi to the south-west and Yungaburra State School in Yungaburra to the south. The nearest government secondary schools are Atherton State High School in Atherton to the south-west and Malanda State High School in Malanda to the south.

== Attractions ==
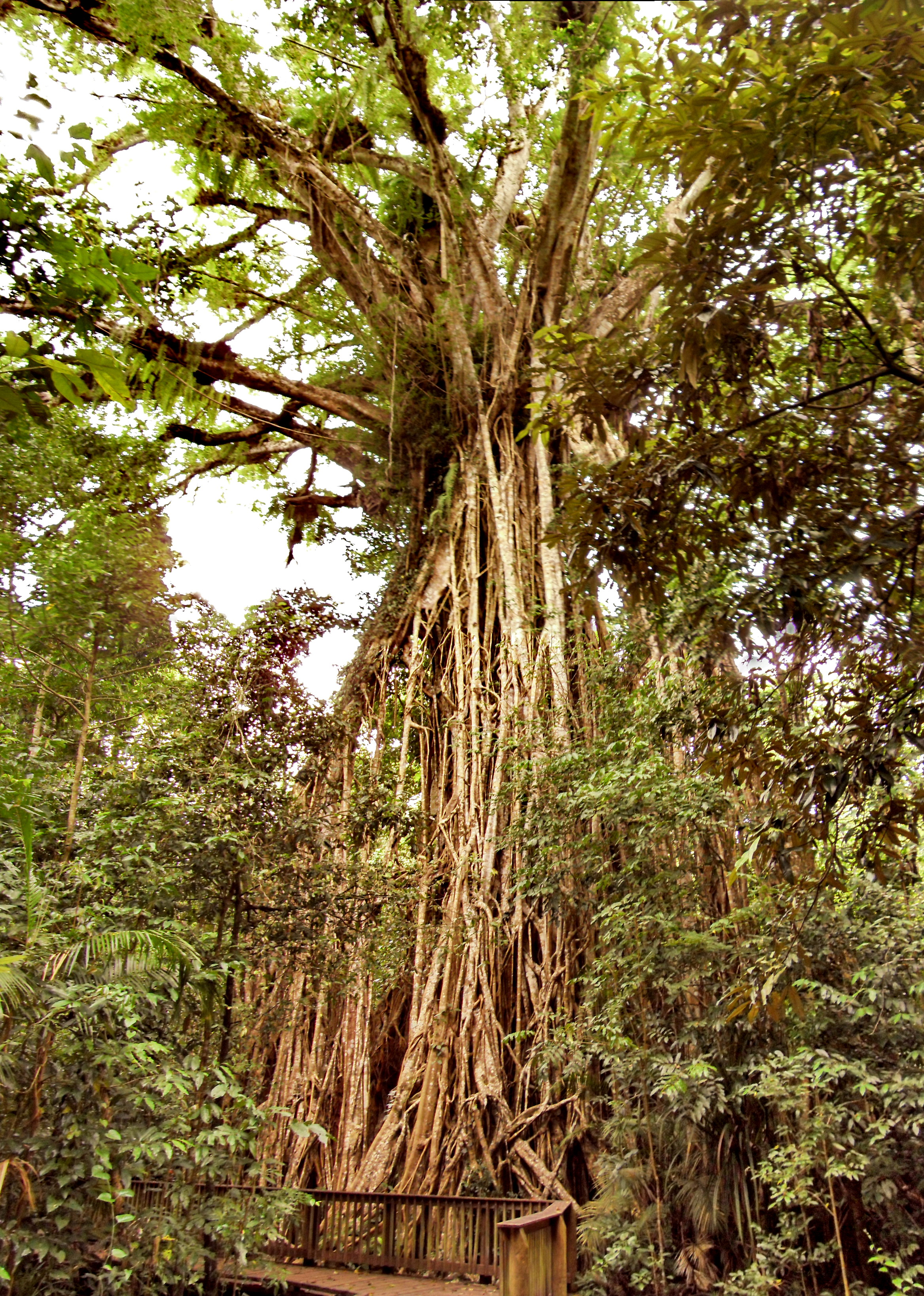
Cathedral Fig Tree, 2008

The Cathedral Fig Tree is on Danbulla Road (17.1776°S 145.6587°E). The tree is estimated to be 500 years old and its canopy at 50 metres (160 ft) above the ground is described as being the size of "2 Olympic swimming pools".

The Lake Euramoo Lookout is on Danbulla Road (17.1613°S 145.6275°E). A lakeside walking track leaves from the lookout.
