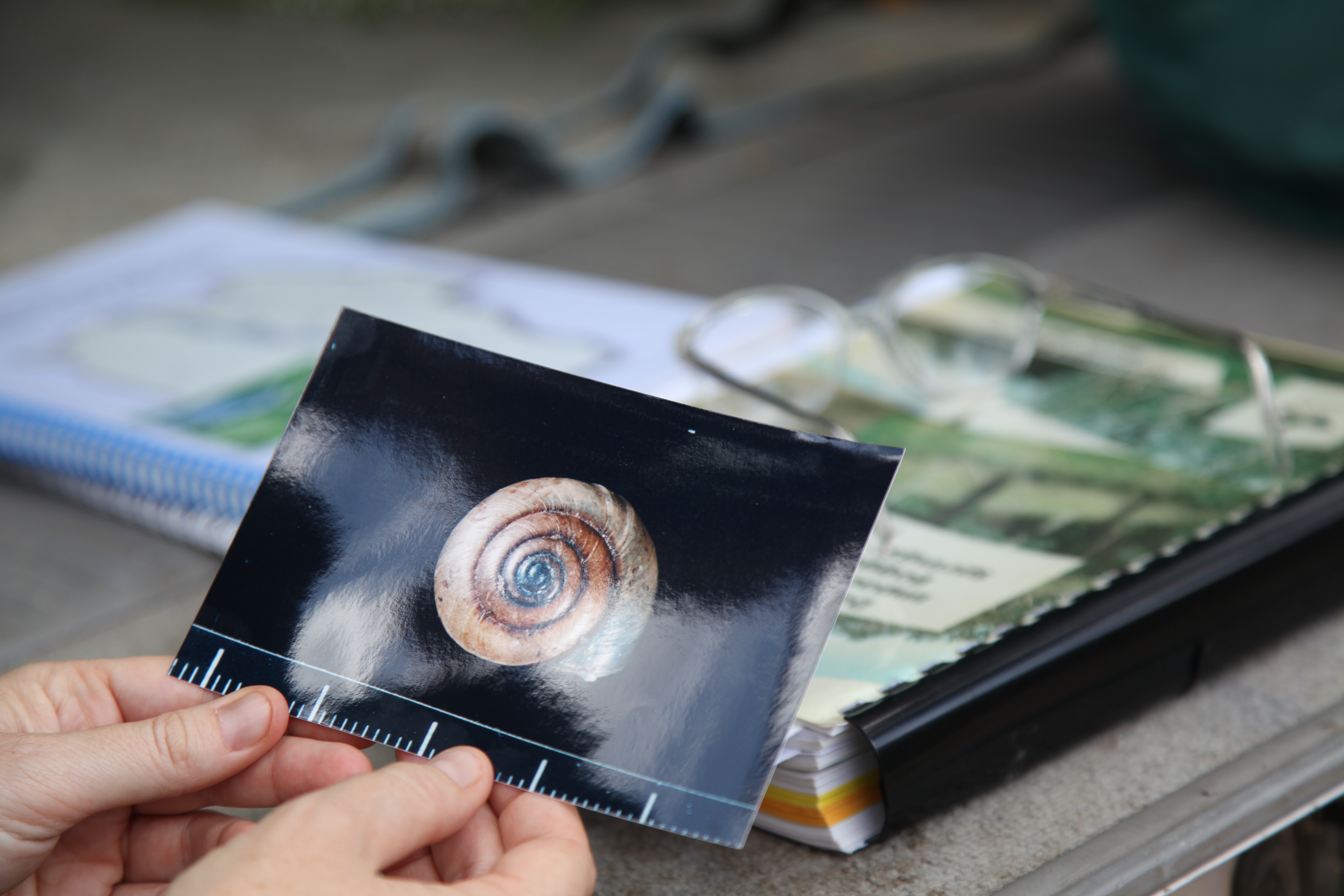
- Photograph of a preserved shell of Adclarkia dawsonensis

Conservation status
- Critically endangered (EPBC Act)

Scientific classification
- Kingdom: Animalia
- Phylum: Mollusca
- Class: Gastropoda
- Order: Stylommatophora
- Family: Camaenidae
- Genus: Adclarkia
- Species: A. dawsonensis

Binomial name
- Adclarkia dawsonensis Stanisic, 1996

= Adclarkia dawsonensis =

Species of gastropod

Adclarkia dawsonensis, also known as boggomoss snail or Dawson Valley snail, is a species of air-breathing land snail, terrestrial pulmonate gastropod mollusk in the family Camaenidae. Adclarkia dawsonensis was the first species described within the genus Adclarkia and is found in the Taroom district in Queensland, Australia.

The specific name dawsonensis is named for the Dawson River valley where the snail is found. The species discovered by John Stanisic, a scientist at the Queensland Museum and it was described in 1996.

== Distribution ==
There are currently two known locations of the species, both in the Taroom area.

The first is located in three boggomosses on Mt Rose Station (private property), with an estimated population >350, spread over an area of approximately 0.75 ha. Before the surrounding land was cleared for farming these three sites were probably part of the same population group.

The second is located in the riparian zone of the Dawson River on a camping and water reserve at the Isla-Delusion crossing approximately halfway between the towns of Taroom and Theodore, with an estimated population of <500 spread over an area of approximately 44.5 ha.

It is thought that the species was once more widespread but its range has been greatly reduced by destruction of its preferred habitat.

With the revival of the proposal to build the Nathan Dam, one of the environmental concerns was the snails on the Mt Rose Station would be inundated by the dam impoundment. In 2009, a trial project was established to see if these populations could be successfully relocated to other suitable habitats. However, SunWater claimed that further studies revealed populations of 18,000 snails at other unidentified locations outside the inundation area, reducing the concern about the risk of the dam to the snails as a species, allowing the planning of the dam to resume. However, as at August 2015, the Queensland Government still lists the snail as "endangered in Queensland" with only two population groups.

== Description ==
The comparatively thin and semi-transparent shell is of helicoid shape is light-brown to greenish-yellow horn, occasionally with a narrow, red subsutural band and a small, red circumumbilical patch. The shell has 5 1/8 to 5 5/8 whorls with last whorl slowly descending. Very slightly elevated apex and spire. The aperture is subcircular. The apertural margin is white and weakly reflected. The umbilicus is small, 2.34~3.24 mm (mean 2.63 mm), and partly covered by the dilated columellar margin. The width of the shell is 21.68-25.74 mm (mean 23.82 mm). The height of the shell is 14.58-16.62 mm (mean 15.80 mm).

The shell surface appears smooth, but microscopically shows a series of covering ridgelets that bear a fine elongate scale in fresh specimens.

The animal has colour variations within the species, being light brown to white with varying amounts of grey on the neck, sides of the foot and above the tail. Distinct irregular black blotches on the lung roof are visible through the shell.
