= Tinaroo, Queensland =

Tinaroo
- Suburb
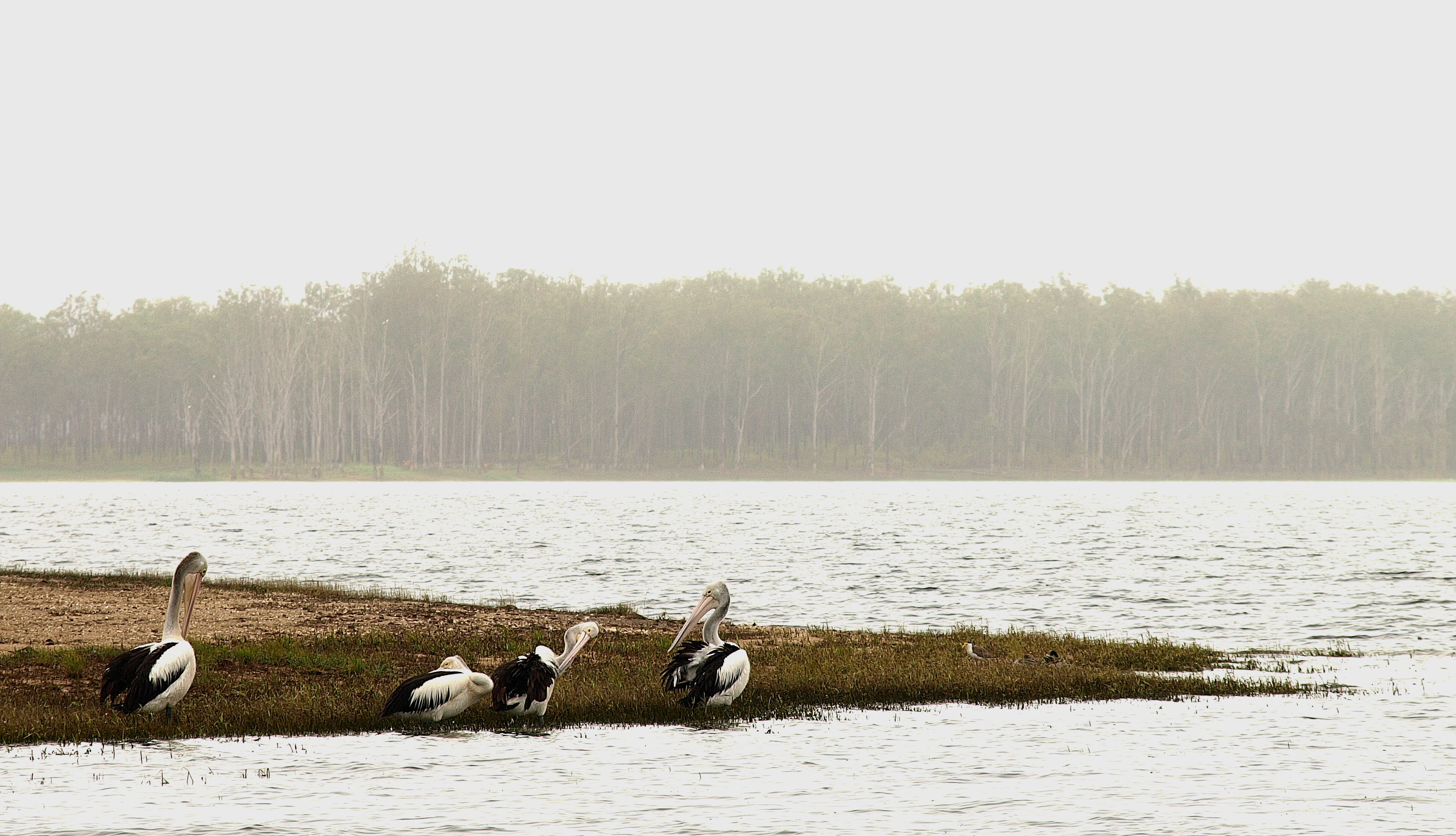
- Pelicans on the shore of Lake Tinaroo, 2008

- Interactive map of Tinaroo
- Coordinates: 17.1677°S 145.5472°E
- Country: Australia
- State: Queensland
- LGA: Tablelands Region
- Location: 17.6 km (10.9 mi) NE of Atherton; 88.0 km (54.7 mi) SW of Cairns; 363 km (226 mi) NNW of Townsville; 1,715 km (1,066 mi) NNW of Brisbane

Government
  - State electorate: Hill
  - Federal division: Kennedy

Area
  - Total: 20.2 km^{2} (7.8 sq mi)

Population
  - Total: 293 (2021 census)
  - Density: 14.50/km^{2} (37.57/sq mi)
- Time zone: UTC+10:00 (AEST)
- Postcode: 4872
Suburbs around Tinaroo
Mareeba	Mareeba	Danbulla
Tolga	Tinaroo	Lake Tinaroo
Tolga	Kairi	Lake Tinaroo

Tinaroo is a rural locality in the Tablelands Region, Queensland, Australia. In the 2021 census, Tinaroo had a population of 293 people.

The town of Tinaroo Falls is on the eastern edge of the locality (17.1683°S 145.5494°E) beside Lake Tinaroo.

== Geography ==
Tinaroo is located on the shore of Lake Tinaroo, a man-made reservoir created by the impoundment of the Barron River by the Tinaroo Dam.

Despite the town's name, the waterfall of the same name is not in the town nor the locality, but it is very close by in the neighbouring locality of Lake Tinaroo, which includes the dam wall, the lake it impounds and the shoreline around the lake.

== History ==
The town and locality take their name from Tinaroo Creek, which is believed to derive from tin hurroo, a shout used by tin miners.

Construction of the dam commenced in 1955 and the town was created to house the workers and their families. Tinaroo State School opened on 28 June 1954 for the workers' children. Construction completed in 1958 and the school closed on 4 December 1959.

Tinaroo Environmental Education Centre was established in 1987.

== Demographics ==
In the 2006 census, Tinaroo had a population of 266 people.

In the 2016 census, Tinaroo had a population of 312 people.

In the 2021 census, Tinaroo had a population of 293 people.

== Education ==
Tinaroo Environmental Education Centre is 30-44 Tinaroo Falls Dam Road (17.1685°S 145.5479°E). Operated by the Queensland Education Department, it provides outdoor and environment school programs.

There are no mainstream schools in Tinaroo. The nearest government primary school is Kairi State School in neighbouring Kairi to the south. The nearest government secondary school is Atherton State High School in Atherton to the south-west.

== Attractions ==
Torpedo Bay Walking Track commences 2.3 km north of the dam wall and includes six lookouts.

Platypus Rock Lookout is accessed from the Platypus Campground Road (17.1576°S 145.5612°E).

There is a boat ramp in Church Street providing access to the lake (17.1715°S 145.5515°E). It is managed by the Tablelands Regional Council.
