= Barrine =

- Suburb
- Interactive map of Barrine
- Coordinates: 17.2277°S 145.6161°E
- Country: Australia
- State: Queensland
- LGA: Tablelands Region
- Location: 15.9 km (9.9 mi) NNE of Yungaburra; 24.0 km (14.9 mi) N of Malanda; 28.6 km (17.8 mi) NE of Atherton; 63.1 km (39.2 mi) SW of Cairns; 1,713 km (1,064 mi) NNW of Brisbane

Government
  - State electorate: Hill
  - Federal division: Kennedy

Area
  - Total: 26.1 km^{2} (10.1 sq mi)

Population
  - Total: 303 (2021 census)
  - Density: 11.61/km^{2} (30.07/sq mi)
- Time zone: UTC+10:00 (AEST)
- Postcode: 4872
Suburbs around Barrine
Lake Tinaroo	Lake Tinaroo	Danbulla
Lake Tinaroo	Barrine	Lake Barrine
Lake Tinaroo	Yungaburra	Lake Barrine

Barrine is a rural locality in the Tablelands Region, Queensland, Australia. In the 2021 census, Barrine had a population of 303 people.

== Geography ==
The locality is bounded to the north, north-west, west, and south-west by Lake Tinaroo, created by Tinaroo Dam's impoundment of the Barron River.

Road access into the locality is limited to three routes, all of which connect to the Gillies Highway:

- Russel Pocket Road (from Yungaburra to the south)
- Lloyd Road (from the locality of Lake Barrine to the south-west)
- Powly Road (from the locality of Lake Barrine to the west)

The land use is predominantly grazing on native vegetation with pockets of rural residential housing (particularly near the lake) as well as undeveloped areas.

== History ==
Boar Pocket State School opened in 1909. In 1912, it was renamed Barrine State School. It closed in 1958 with the filling of Lake Tinaroo. It was at approximately 17.2091°S 145.6160°E.

In January 1911, residents of Kulara (then a small town to the north of Yungaburra) began lobbying for a school, claiming there were 42 children in the district. Kulara State School opened on 17 June 1912. It closed on 1 September 1958, when the Tinaroo Dam began to fill, inundating the town. However, being on higher ground, the school building was not flooded and became a private residence at 85 Backshall Road (now in Barrine, 17.24420°S 145.58306°E).

== Demographics ==
In the 2016 census, Barrine had a population of 241 people.

In the 2021 census, Barrine had a population of 303 people.

== Education ==
There are no schools in Barrine. The nearest government primary school is Yungaburra State School in neighbouring Yungaburra to the south. The nearest government secondary school is Malanda State High School in Malanda to the south.
