= Tinaroo Hydro Power Station =

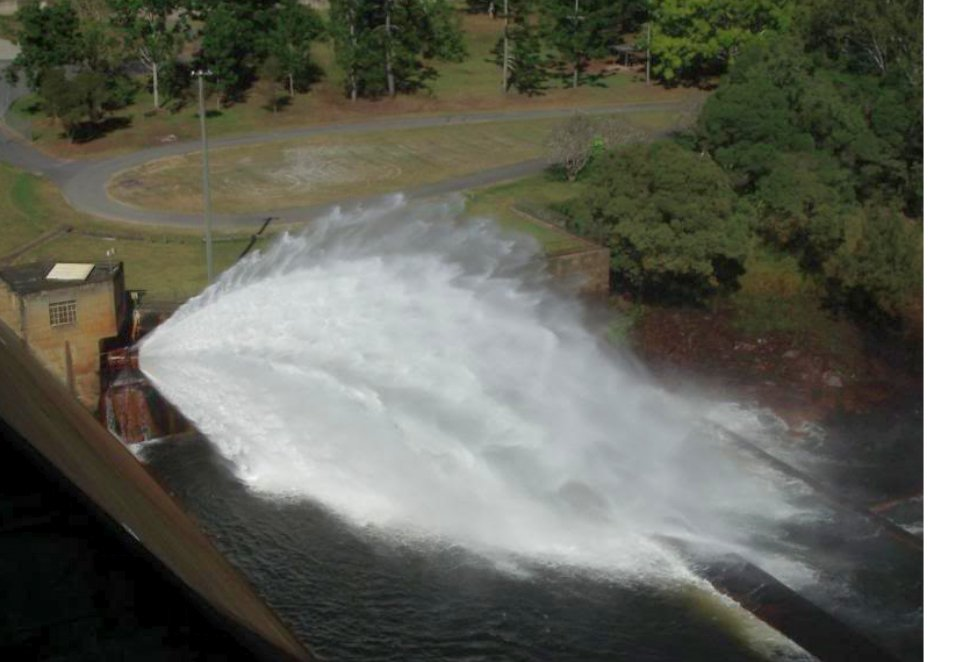
- Country: Australia
- Location: Tinaroo, Queensland
- Coordinates: 17°09′49″S 145°32′50″E
- Commission date: May 2004
- Construction cost: $4 million
- Owner: SunWater
- Operator: SunWater

Power generation
- Units operational: 1
- Make and model: Francis turbine
- Nameplate capacity: 1.6 MW (2,100 hp)
- Annual net output: 5579 MWh (2012/13)

External links
- Website: www.sunwater.com.au

The Tinaroo Hydro Power Station is an electricity power station in Tinaroo, Tablelands Region, Queensland, Australia. It is located at the spillway of Tinaroo Dam. It has been designed to take advantage of water being released for irrigation, and water released when the dam is full. It was opened in 2004.

== See also ==
- List of active power stations in Queensland
