= Dinner Falls =

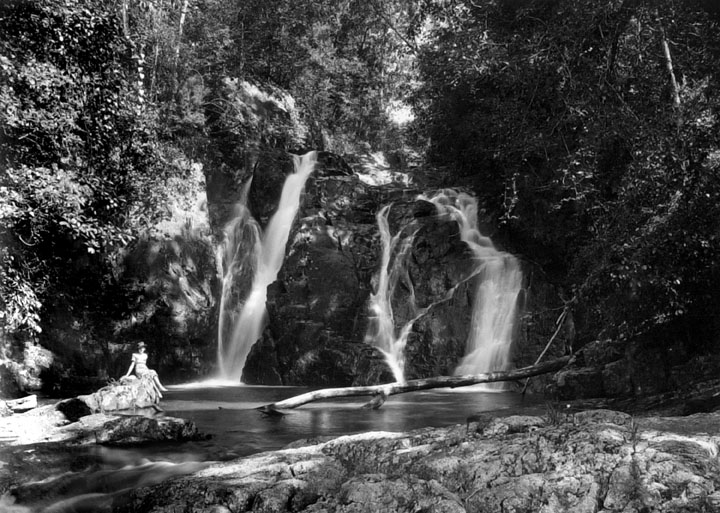
- Dinner Falls, at Mount Hypipamee near Herberton, circa 1935.

- Location within Queensland
- Location: Far North Queensland, Australia
- Coordinates: 17°25′59″S 145°29′00″E
- Type: Plunge; Segmented; Cascade
- Number of drops: 3
- Watercourse: Barron River

The Dinner Falls is a mix of three waterfalls that display plunge, segmented and cascade characteristics on the upper Barron River located in the Far North region of Queensland, Australia.

== Location and features ==
The waterfall is located approximately 25 kilometres (16 mi) south of Atherton on the Atherton Tableland near the Mount Hypipamee Crater in the Mount Hypipamee National Park. The bottommost of the waterfall series is a long cascade fall; the middle section of the falls is a trio of segmented drops; while the uppermost section of the falls has a triangular shape as it plunges off the tableland plateau.

Access to the falls is via a walking track.

== See also ==
- List of waterfalls
- List of waterfalls in Australia
