= Lake Euramoo =

Lake in Queensland, Australia

Lake Euramoo (Ngimun)
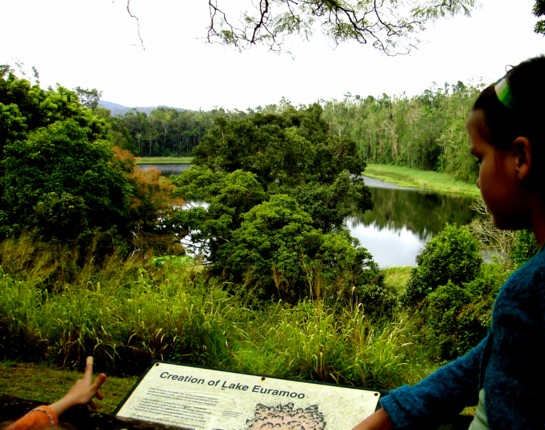
- view from road site viewing platform

- Location within Queensland
- Location: Danbulla, Tablelands Region, Far North Queensland, Australia
- Coordinates: 17.1591°S 145.629°E
- Type: late Pleistocene maar: ovate double explosion crater
- Primary inflows: no inflow channels
- Primary outflows: no outflow channels
- Catchment area: 4.4 ha (11 acres)
- Basin countries: Australia
- Average depth: 20 m (66 ft) (northern basin), 16 m (52 ft) (southern basin)
- Surface elevation: 718 m (2,356 ft)

Lake Euramoo (a.k.a. Ngimun & Nuta) is a shallow dumbbell-shaped volcanic crater lake (a maar) in Danbulla, Tablelands Region, Far North Queensland, Australia. It was formed about 23,000 years ago by two massive explosions from groundwater superheating.

The crater lake is known to Yidinji, within their oral history and mythology as Ngimun, and known to neighbouring Ngdjon-jii as Nuta; though formally gazetted by the Queensland Government as "Lake Euramoo", Euramo being the Dyirbal word for river (yuramu).

The lake (Ngimun) falls within the current Danbulla National Park and State Forest, on the Tertiary uplifted highlands of the Atherton Tableland, within the Wet Tropics of Queensland World Heritage Area, Australia.

== Origins ==
Yidinji and Ngadjon-jii mythology explaining the origin of Ngimun plus two other companion crater lakes, Yidyam (Lake Eacham) and Barany (Lake Barrine), has been described as a plausible and surprisingly accurate oral account of volcanic eruptions or explosions in the area around 10,000 years ago.

It is said that two newly-initiated men broke a taboo and angered the rainbow serpent Yamany, major spirit of the area ... As a result 'the camping-place began to change, the earth under the camp roaring like thunder. The wind started to blow down, as if a cyclone were coming. The camping-place began to twist and crack. While this was happening there was in the sky a red cloud, of a hue never seen before. The people tried to run from side to side but were swallowed by a crack which opened in the ground'....

.. After telling the myth, in 1964, the storyteller remarked that when this happened the country round the lakes was 'not jungle - just open scrub'. In 1968, a dated pollen diagram from the organic sediments of Lake Euramoo [Ngimun] by Peter Kershaw (1970) showed, rather surprisingly, that the rain forest in that area is only about 7,600 years old.

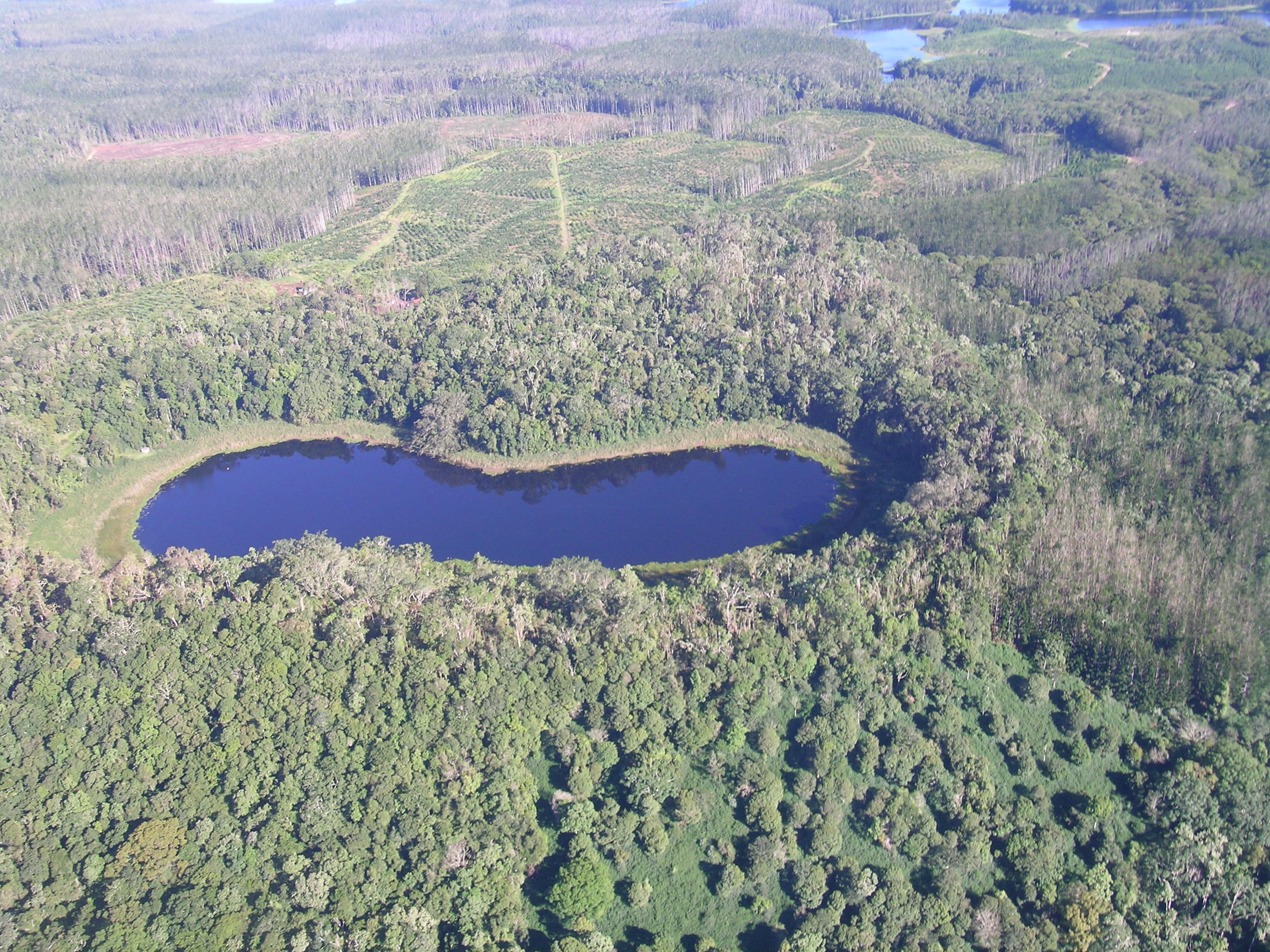
Aerial view of Lake Euramoo, looking towards the west.

== Vegetation ==
The vegetation surrounding Lake Euramoo (Ngimun) is a remnant of moist sub montane rainforest, surrounded by previously cleared land that, within the last 50 years, has been planted with endemic hoop pine (Araucaria cunninghamii) and exotic conifers, or recolonised by the remnant rainforest species.

Typical moist submontane rainforest species found near Lake Euramoo (Ngimun), within 100 m, include:

- Araliaceae (e.g. Polyscias australiana, Heptapleurum actinophyllum)
- Araucariaceae (e.g. Agathis robusta)
- Moraceae (e.g. Ficus sp.)
- Elaeocarpaceae (e.g. Elaeocarpus grandis)
- Euphorbiaceae (e.g. Aleurites moluccana, Macaranga spp.)
- Myrtaceae (e.g. Austromyrtus spp., Eugenia cormiflora)
- Rubiaceae (e.g. Flindersia brayleyana,Euodia bonwickii)

Around the margin of Ngimun are identifiable zones of aquatic plants that fluctuate with water depth and the seasons:

- At Lake Euramoo (Ngimun)'s edge, rainforest lianas (e.g. Parsonsia spp.) intertwine with tall swamp grasses (Phragmites australis).
- Away from the canopy's shade and the liana growth, up to 1 m water depth, the Hibiscus spp. and Ludwigia spp. become more common.
- Further out there are rooted aquatic plants, floating vegetation mats, and, finally, up to 30 m from the edge are the floating aquatic plants (mainly Nymphoides spp.).

== Notes and references ==
=== References ===
- Dixon, R. M. W. (1972). The Dyirbal Language of North Queensland. Cambridge University Press. p. 29. ISBN 978-1-108-02504-1.
- Dixon, R. M. W. (2011). Searching for Aboriginal Languages: Memoirs of a Field Worker. Cambridge University Press. ISBN 978-1-108-02504-1.
