= Kairi Maize Silos =

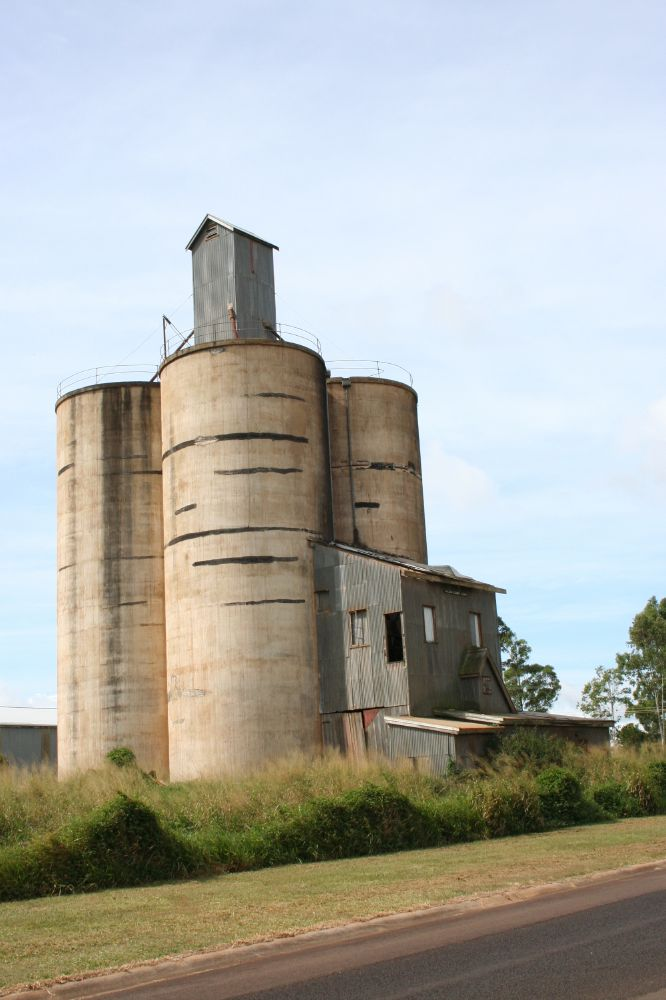
- Kairi Maize Silos, 2007

- Location within Queensland Location within Australia
- 17.2163°S 145.5404°E
- Location: 22 Godfrey Road, Kairi, Tablelands Region, Queensland, Australia

History
- Built: 1924

Site notes
- Architect: Henry Simon Ltd

Queensland Heritage Register
- Official name: Kairi Maize Silos
- Type: state heritage (built)
- Designated: 8 August 2007
- Reference no.: 602631
- Significant period: 1924-
- Builders: Henry Simon Ltd

Kairi Maize Silos are heritage-listed silos at 22 Godfrey Road, Kairi, Tablelands Region, Queensland, Australia. They were designed and built in 1924 by Henry Simon Ltd. They were added to the Queensland Heritage Register on 8 August 2007.

== History ==
The Kairi Maize Silos are a complex of 4 concrete silos located approximately 10 kilometres (6.2 mi) east of Atherton near the outskirts of Kairi Township on the northern side of the Tolga/Johnstone railway line.

Maize production began purely as a response to a local demand, and grew rapidly as the dominant agricultural industry of the southern Atherton Tablelands up until the Second World War. Although some of the crop was exported to the south and overseas, its main market was and remains regional. Chinese settlers were instrumental in setting up the industry during the late 19th century, and returned soldiers from the First World War continued the industry in the early 20th century. The maize industry has experienced mixed fortunes over its history and has been subject to government intervention at every stage of its evolution. It now remains as a small section of the local economy, no longer monocultural, or as the dominant crop.

During the early 1920s, pricing problems and the region's climate impacted on the area's ability to store grain. This led to the formation of the Atherton Tableland Maize Board, which became responsible for storage issues and marketing the crop. In 1924, the Atherton Tablelands Maize Board erected three storage cluster silo complexes at Kairi, Tolga and Atherton. Only the Kairi Maize Silos remain as evidence of the region's significant maize industry.

Agriculture in the Atherton Tablelands followed mining and grazing. Although timber drew many settlers to the area, the maize industry was pivotal in opening up the Atherton Tablelands to agriculture. Maize initially fulfilled the requirements for stockfeed for the mining communities around Herberton and Irvinebank and later, further west.

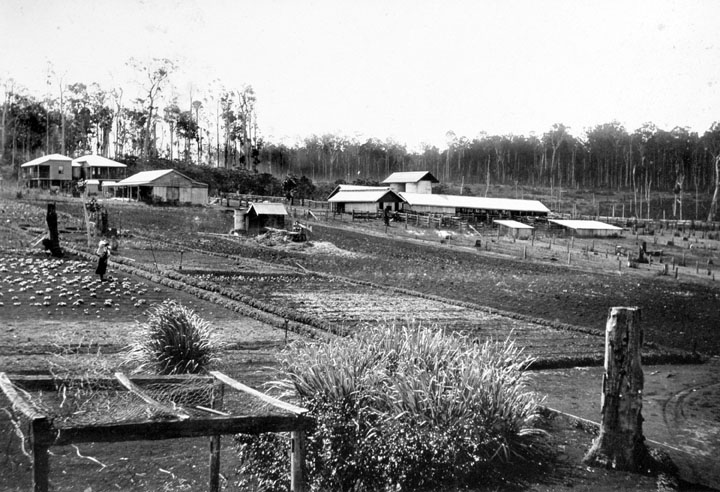
Kairi State Farm, circa 1930

Realising that it would be difficult to prosper only from planting maize crops, the farmers attempted to find alternate crops. The Atherton Farmers' Associated lobbied the Minister for Agriculture to establish a State Farm to provide research and advice on the growing of different strains of maize. As a result, the Kairi State Farm was established in 1912 and was responsible for much of the experimental work carried out within the maize industry. The Kairi State Farm remained in operation until closed by the Queensland Government in 1935 despite the closure being disputed by the farming community which pointed out to the Government the desirability of having such a facility in a tropical environment.

White maize farmers resented the successful Chinese maize growers and with the inception of the Soldier Settler Scheme in 1917, Chinese farmers were displaced.

The area of land planted to maize steadily declined from 1919 to 1923 due to a series of difficulties experienced by small farmers under the Soldier Settlement Scheme despite attempts by the Government to relieve problems and allocate abandoned farms to remaining settlers to increase the size of their land. However at the time available varieties of maize were not suitable for the climatic conditions and were subject to various fungal and bacterial conditions. This resulted in an inferior product for the market and a push to resolve the problem by growing resistant strains of maize, and by erecting proper storage.

Farmers experienced difficulty in drying their crops and protecting it from pests while in storage. Treatment for pest eradication in the stored grain was costly, requiring an investment in drying and storage facilities for each farm. Failure to dry the grain to the required 14% of moisture also resulted in mouldy grain which was difficult to sell and added to the poor reputation of the Tablelands crop. Initially farmers stored their maize in barns but rodents and weevils soon encouraged the more affluent farmers to erect 1,200-imperial-gallon (5,500 L; 1,400 US gal) galvanised tanks for storage. They tried to overcome grain moisture problems by sun drying their maize on canvas tarpaulins before storing it in the tanks. Carbon bisulphate was then added to the top of the sealed tanks to kill the weevils. These efforts had variable results.

The Queensland Department of Agriculture and Stock recognised the difficulties and advocated for a modern plant for the drying, treatment and storage of the grain as early as 1921. It identified the need for a centralised, modern drying and storage facility, but recognised that the financing of such a facility was an insurmountable obstacle for the farmers. This difficulty, as well as the problems inherent in the marketing of the crop, was overcome by the introduction of legislation which was part of the complete reorganisation of agriculture in Queensland.

During the interwar period, the Queensland Government introduced five critical pieces of legislation which fundamentally affected the maize industry on the Atherton Tablelands. The Cooperative Production Act of 1914–19 allowed farmers to borrow money from the Government for centralised storage. The Primary Producers' Organisation Act of 1922 provided for the political organisation of agriculture. The Primary Producers' Cooperative Association Act of 1923 made possible the formation of cooperative companies to deal with the marketing of primary produce. The Primary Products Pool Act of 1923 enabled the establishment of pools of primary produce which allowed all the farmers to be placed on an equal footing, with one selling agent to handle the marketing of the crop and the Agricultural Bank Act of 1923 provided for cooperatives to borrow money for advance payments on crops before the sale of the commodity.

By 1923, as a result of the introduction of these pieces of legislation, the farmers had the means to form themselves into a Cooperative Company, raise money for suitable grain handling facilities, and market the crop as a whole, with returns guaranteed to each grower. The maize farmers after much acrimonious debate, took advantage of the legislation, and formed a pool, administered by the Atherton Tablelands Maize Marketing Board by authority of the Primary Producers' Organisation and Marketing Act of 1922–1926.

Thus, the inaugural Atherton Tableland Maize Growers Board negotiated a loan of £70,000 from the Government and built storage facilities at Tolga and Kairi, and a storage and drying plant at Atherton. Each had a working capacity of about 650 long tons (660 t), barely enough to process the anticipated delivery of about 20,000 long tons (20,000 t). The Board began operations in 1924, in time to handle the harvest of that year.

Each cylindrical concrete structure was constructed to 25 feet (7.6 m) in diameter and 70 feet (21 m) high.

The silos were designed, constructed and equipped with elevators, cleaning plant and driers by a Sydney-based firm Henry Simon Ltd.

Constructed using "sliding form" concreting (later known as slip-form concreting) the Kairi Maize Silos is one of the earliest applications of this technique in the construction of maize silos in Australia. The construction of the Kairi Maize Silos was overseen by a British engineer, Mr. C.P. Kinninmonth. The facility cost £7,000 which was financed by the Queensland Treasury, and was repaid through levies on maize sold by the Board. The silos were opened by the Honourable William Gillies on the 15 November 1924.

The complex was initially powered by a single cylinder 20 horse power Ronaldson Brothers & Tippet horizontal engine. In a measure of efficiency the engine was fuelled by burning corn cobs after they had been shelled. It powered the grain elevator and the fans to dry the maize. This engine was replaced in the 1930s, and may have incorporated an electrically driven system.

A small axial flow fan was constructed in the base of each silo. This was attached to perforated ducting, which sat on the floor of the silo. When in operation, the fan blew cool dry air, which was distributed via the ducting throughout the bin. This reduced the temperature of the maize within the structure to a level at which insect and mould development could not occur. A combination of drying and cooling using this method enabled the maize to be maintained in a sound and fresh condition for long periods. Cleaning equipment was located at each silo complex, while a drying plant was established at the Atherton silos to process maize with a moisture content exceeding 14 percent.

When the maize was received at the silos it was discharged from the truck through a grate in the timber floor of the grain receiving building, into a bin. From sub-surface level the maize was lifted by an elevator about 5–6 metres (16–20 ft) to the mezzanine floor above, which housed the sorting / grading machine. The sorting machine removed foreign matter from the shelled maize.

Using a system of electrically driven conveyor belts and elevators, grain in the silos was directed around the cluster of silos for cleaning, re-cooling or back through the tunnel to transport it from the site.

The elevator, located in the inter-silo space, carried the maize to the maize elevator tower which straddles the roof of the four silos. The maize then was conveyed through one of four chutes, into a designated silo. This part of the process was performed manually and access to the maize elevator tower was via a ladder attached to the exterior wall of one of the silos. Provision for access to the tower was incorporated by installing a passageway under the silos, which led to a ladder attached to the exterior wall. The silos could be fully emptied of its maize by the incorporation of inspection hatches located at the base of the silo.

The silos were an example of the socialisation of agriculture practiced by the Queensland Labor government following World War I. It based its practice on Union organisation principles, with the aim to organise the farmers in order to cut out the middleman and market co-operatively. Bolstering these organisations would be State-provided infrastructure such as transport, agricultural education and research.

The system of organised marketing and pooling of the crop certainly gave the farmers some surety of income, but instead of eliminating the "middleman" it imposed another layer of bureaucracy, for which the farmers had to pay. The Queensland Government experiment with agrarian socialism during the establishment of the maize industry on the Atherton Tableland resulted in a highly regulated industry which produced high levels of debt for the cooperative entity and local government. The system did not meet expectations and was not an outstanding success on the Atherton Tablelands.

In the years following the construction of the silos the costs associated with the production of maize dropped and remained fairly stable, rising and falling as a percentage of grower returns, but remaining in the region of 20% to 25% of total returns. In spite of being the only maize growing area in Queensland to take advantage of legislation which allowed farmers to take control of the collective marketing of the crop, the industry struggled until the Second World War. The small size of farms forced farmers to grow maize as their only crop resulting in weed infestations, pests, and erosion gradually depleting the soil and grain yield. This often reduced farmers to a state of grinding poverty.

The years of the 1930s Depression followed by the Second World War affected many of the people involved in the maize industry on the Atherton Tablelands. Decline in farm values meant that immigrant farmers were able to acquire more land, albeit run down, as the debt-ridden soldier settlers and other settlers left the industry. Gradually the farms were taken over and enlarged, in many cases by migrant farmers from Italy, Albania, and Yugoslavia, some of whom were interned during the Second World War as "enemy aliens." The state of the industry improved when the Maize Board in 1936 began manufacturing poultry rations, and the "Athmaze" brand of stock and poultry feeds was introduced. This activity consumed around 21% of maize produced on the Atherton Tablelands in the 1930s and 1940s.

After the Second World War advances in technology allowed farmers to increase production and efficiency but it was not until the 1960s that government sponsored research produced high yielding maize varieties, introduced rotation of crops, and established weed, pest and conservation management programmes. However, a monocultural approach to cropping had led to loss of the soil fertility which originally had been caused by nutrient recycling in the long-gone rain forest. It had also caused widespread erosion and thousands of tons of top-soil had been washing into the Barron River for decades. Realising that action had to be taken, farmers agreed to a compulsory levy of 1s. per ton on all maize produced in order to set up research projects on erosion and soil fertility, pest management and weed control. In 1946 this led to the reopening and redesignation of the State Farm at Kairi as a Regional Research Station. This Government action proved to be of enormous benefit to the maize farmers and the agricultural lands of the Atherton Tableland.

By the early 1970s the whole of the industry's maize production was absorbed by the dairy, poultry and pig industries of the Tableland and coastal areas including Mossman to Tully. The economic climate of the 1980s had been a very difficult time for the maize industry. Therefore, the industry entered the 1990s in a state of uncertainty and ferment, with poor returns, and an economy which made management of farms and businesses very difficult. The affairs of the Atherton Tableland Maize Marketing Board and of Athmaize, the milling and stock-feed operation, had been merged since the inception of Athmaize in 1936. In 1993 the Queensland government introduced deregulation to the maize industry and with the introduction in 1993 of a permit system with a fee of $16.00 per tonne led to the dissolution of the Board. The Boards assets and liabilities were transferred to the Athmaize Producers' Cooperative Association on 1 March 1994. Athmaize went into liquidation in 2002 thus ending 75 years of the Board's control of the maize industry on the Atherton Tablelands.

== Description ==
The Kairi Maize Silos are located on the southern boundary of Lot 7 RP901633, at its midpoint, which faces Godfrey Road.

The Silos are constructed from reinforced concrete and are not adorned with any decorative elements.

The place comprises a group of four separate silos arranged in a cluster. A corrugated galvanised iron, timber framed, multi-level skillion structure containing the receiving shed, office, toilets, elevators, conveyors and drive shafts, and engine room, abuts the southern walls of two of the silos.

A galvanised corrugated iron, elongated maize elevator tower straddles the roofs of the four silos. The tower is accessed through a passageway under the silos which is still present, and this leads to a ladder attached to the exterior wall. This passageway also houses the elevators for carrying the maize to the top of silos. The entrance to this passageway is located inside the maize receiving shed and is accessed via a wooden ladder. The subsurface areas and passageway were not accessed.

Internal infrastructure which remains at the place includes the facility's plant consisting of an engine connected by a drive wheel to the drive shaft and all associated elements to attach it to the ceiling of the receiving shed. Not inspected but also present are the elevators and conveyor belts (housed in the shed but in a largely disassembled state) and the intact maize sorting / grading machine, regarded as remnant machinery c. 1920s, and located on the mezzanine floor of the grain receiving building, approximately 5 metres (16 ft) above ground level and its camel haired conveyor belt. The truck despatch and receiving entrance is also extant. The access ladder used to enter the underground passageway, was extant although unusable located inside the maize receiving shed.

On the exterior of each silo are hatches / manholes located around 5 metres (16 ft) from the base of the silo. These are made of cast iron and are hinged at the bottom of the base plate. They are secured shut by two simple catches. Ventilation shafts are located at the base of each silo. It is likely that these shafts traversed the base of each silo allowing a fan to pump air through the silo thereby controlling mould and moisture build -up.

== Heritage listing ==
Kairi Maize Silos was listed on the Queensland Heritage Register on 8 August 2007 having satisfied the following criteria.

The place is important in demonstrating the evolution or pattern of Queensland's history.

The Kairi Maize Silos, a cluster of four silos and incorporating associated structures to form a complex, are important in demonstrating the pattern of Queensland's agricultural history where maize was a major long standing industry in Far North Queensland. They are the last surviving example of three silo complexes erected on the Atherton Tableland to store maize and service the industry.

The Kairi Maize Silos are an important example of the regulation of agriculture in Australia during the interwar period, and particularly the regulation of the maize industry under the Maize Marketing Board.

The place demonstrates rare, uncommon or endangered aspects of Queensland's cultural heritage.

The Kairi Maize Silos are a rare aspect of Queensland's cultural heritage. They are the only extant example of a maize silo complex in North Queensland.

The place has potential to yield information that will contribute to an understanding of Queensland's history.

The Kairi Maize Silos are largely intact and significant for their potential to reveal further information about early 20th century concrete silo construction, technology and layout.

The place is important in demonstrating the principal characteristics of a particular class of cultural places.

The Kairi Silos complex demonstrates the principal characteristics of a bulk storage system associated with the Maize industry. It is a rare and largely intact complex incorporating elements of a bulk maize storage system which includes the sorting/grading machine, electric engine, elevators and conveyors. The Kairi Maize silos are the only surviving cluster silo complex on the Atherton Tableland.

The place is important because of its aesthetic significance.

The Kairi Maize Silos with a height of 21 metres (69 ft) and a diameter of 7.6 metres (25 ft), tower above the flat topography of the town and surrounding agricultural landscape of Kairi and the Atherton Tableland. The Silos are topped with an elongated corrugated iron elevator tower which adds further to the Silos as a landmark in this landscape.

The place is important in demonstrating a high degree of creative or technical achievement at a particular period.

The Kairi Maize Silos demonstrate a high degree of technical achievement as they were constructed using slip form concreting. This represents one of the earliest applications of this technique to the construction of maize silos in Queensland.
