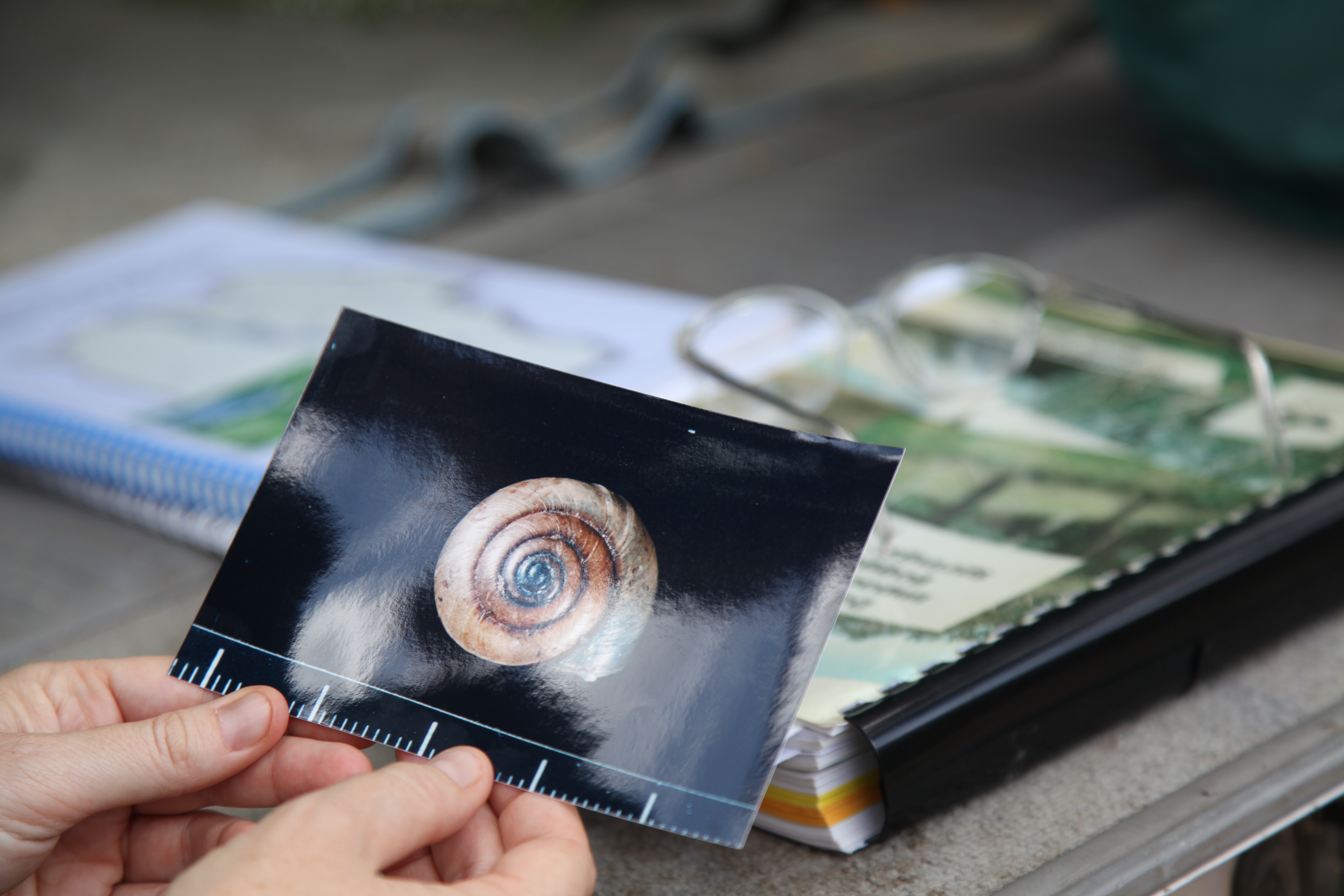
- Photograph of a preserved shell of Adclarkia dawsonensis

Scientific classification
- Kingdom: Animalia
- Phylum: Mollusca
- Class: Gastropoda
- Order: Stylommatophora
- Family: Camaenidae
- Subfamily: Hadrinae
- Genus: Adclarkia; Stanisic, 1996

= Adclarkia =

Genus of gastropods

Adclarkia is a genus of air-breathing land snails, terrestrial pulmonate gastropod mollusks in the family Camaenidae.

The generic name Adclarkia is named after local conservationist Adam Clark.

== Species ==
Species within the genus Adclarkia include:

- Adclarkia cameroni Stanisic, 2010
- Adclarkia dawsonensis Stanisic, 1996 - type species of the genus Adclarkia
- Adclarkia dulacca Stanisic, 2010
