= Tinaroo Falls =

- Location within Queensland
- Location: Far North Queensland, Australia
- Coordinates: 17.1700°S 145.5225°E
- Number of drops: 1
- Watercourse: Barron River

The Tinaroo Falls, a waterfall on the Barron River, is located in the below the Lake Tinaroo dam wall in Far North region of Queensland, Australia.

The traditional custodians of the land surrounding the waterfall are the indigenous Yidinji people. In 2013, the Yidinji people were granted exclusive native title rights to 28 hectares (69 acres) of land near Tinaroo Falls.

== See also ==
- List of waterfalls
- List of waterfalls in Australia
