= Tinaroo Dam =

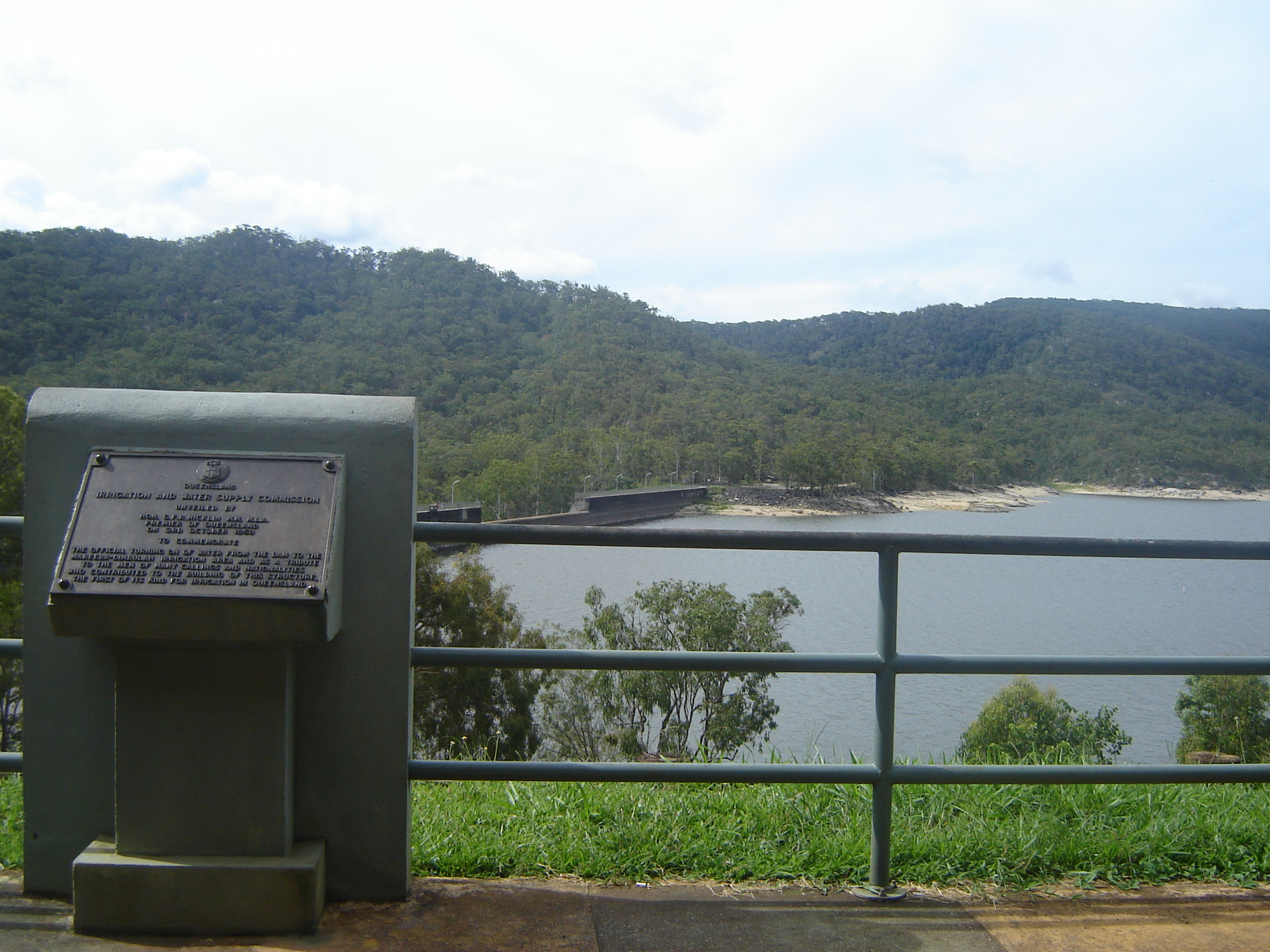
- A photo of the Tinaroo Dam wall

- Location of the Tinaroo Dam in Queensland
- Official name: Tinaroo Falls Dam
- Country: Australia
- Location: Far North Queensland
- Coordinates: 17.16389°S 145.54639°E
- Purpose: Irrigation; Water supply; Power generation; Recreation
- Status: Operational
- Construction began: 1953
- Opening date: 1958
- Construction cost: A$12.6 million
- Operator: SunWater

Dam and spillways
- Type of dam: Gravity dam
- Impounds: Barron River
- Height: 42 m (138 ft)
- Length: 533 m (1,749 ft)
- Width (base): 35.4 m (116 ft)
- Dam volume: 223×10^{3} m^{3} (7.9×10^{6} cu ft)
- Spillways: 1
- Spillway type: Ungated, central ogee
- Spillway capacity: 1,160 m^{3}/s (41,000 cu ft/s)

Reservoir
- Creates: Lake Tinaroo
- Total capacity: 438,919 ML (355,837 acre⋅ft)
- Catchment area: 545 km^{2} (210 sq mi)
- Surface area: 3,500 ha (8,600 acres)
- Maximum water depth: 41.8 m (137 ft)
- Normal elevation: 670.4 m (2,199 ft) AHD

Tinaroo Hydro Power Station
- Coordinates: 17°09′49″S 145°32′50″E
- Operator: SunWater
- Commission date: May 2004
- Type: Conventional
- Turbines: Francis turbine
- Installed capacity: 1.6 MW (2,100 hp)
- Annual generation: 5,579 MWh (20,080 GJ)

The Tinaroo Dam, officially the Tinaroo Falls Dam, is a major ungated concrete gravity dam with a central ogee spillway across the Barron River located on the Atherton Tableland in Far North Queensland, Australia. The dam's purpose includes irrigation for the Mareeba-Dimbulah Irrigation Scheme, water supply, hydroelectricity generation, and recreation. Completed between 1953 and 1958, the dam creates the impounded reservoir, Lake Tinaroo.

== Location and features ==
The dam is located close to Lake Barrine and Lake Eacham (Yidyam).

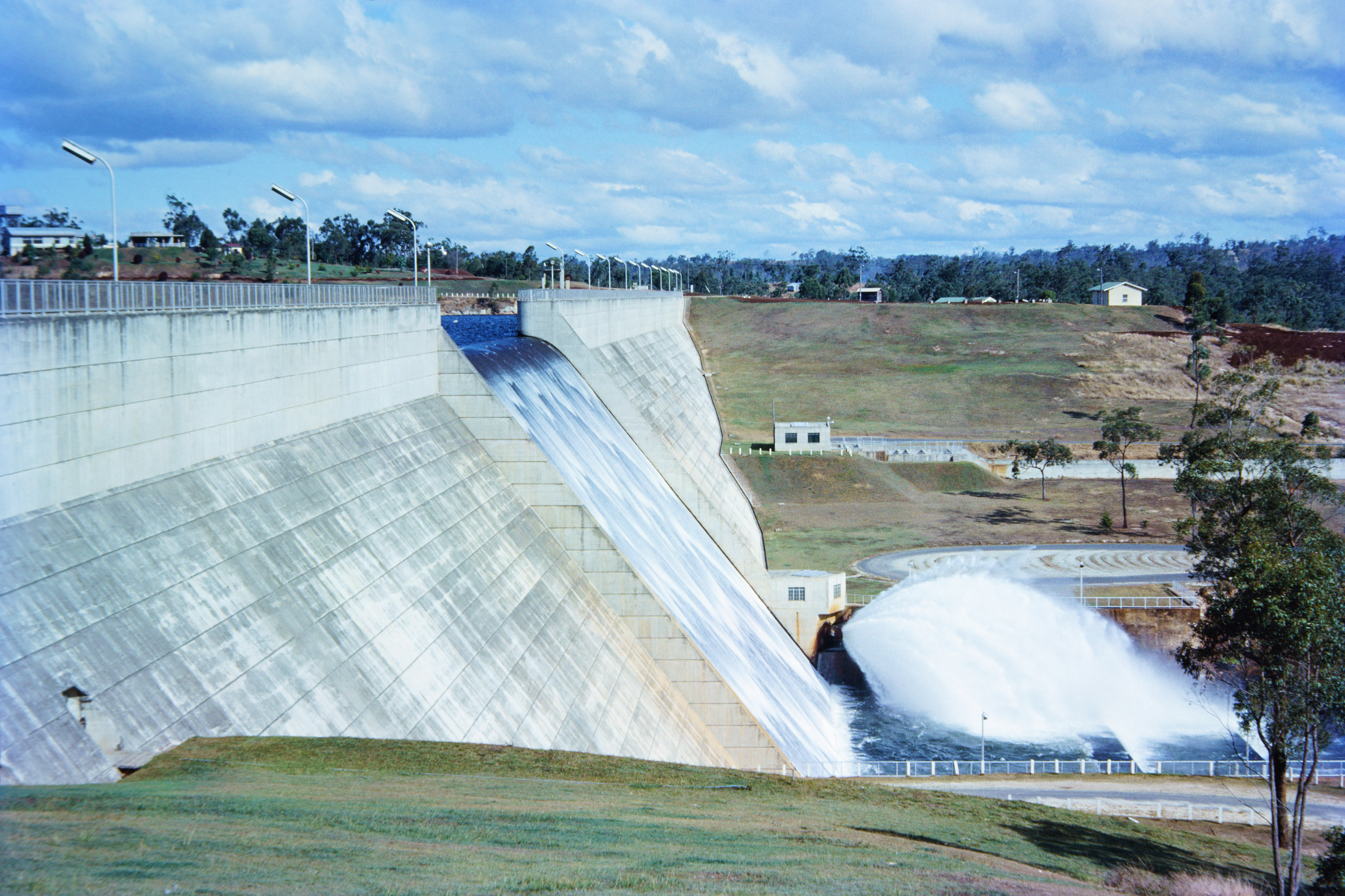
Tinaroo Dam spillway, 1964

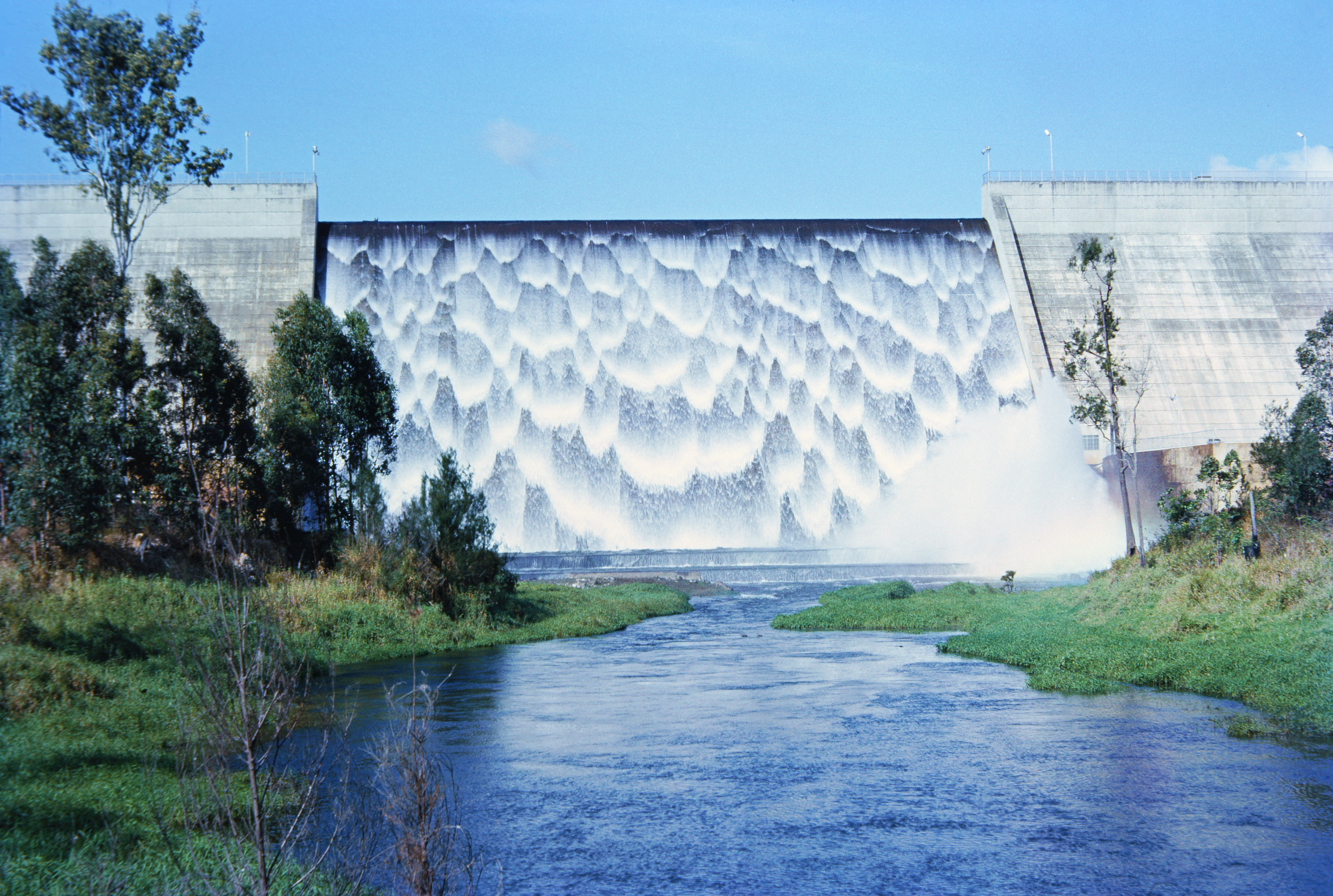
Tinaroo Dam spilling

The dam wall, constructed with 223,000 thousand cubic metres (7,900×10^{6} cu ft) of concrete, is 42 metres (138 ft) high and 533 metres (1,749 ft) long. The maximum water depth is 41.8 metres (137 ft) and at 100% capacity the dam wall impounds enough water from the Barron River to create a lake approximately 75% the size of Sydney Harbour with a capacity of 438,919 megalitres (355,837 acre⋅ft) of water at 670 metres (2,200 ft) AHD. The surface area of the Lake Tinaroo is 3,500 hectares (8,600 acres) and the catchment area is 545 square kilometres (210 sq mi). The ungated, central ogee spillway is capable of discharging 1,160 cubic metres per second (41,000 cu ft/s). Two 500-millimetre (20 in) radial gates serve as irrigation outlets that yields 205,000 megalitres (7,200×10^{6} cu ft) annually. In addition, one 500-millimetre (20 in) core valve serves as an outlet for the Barron River.

After the dam was completed in 1958, there was expected to be another few months before the annual rains to do some final earthworks at the base of the dam, and to clear out the final settlements in the area. Unfortunately the rains began earlier than expected and to this day there are still some pieces of large construction equipment under water at the base of the dam wall, because they were not able to be removed in time.

In 2011 the dam's operator, SunWater, completed improvements that included work on both the main dam wall and the saddle dam. The main dam wall was reinforced with the insertion of steel cable anchors within the wall and the addition of a concrete protection slab along the downstream base of the dam wall. The height of the saddle dam was increased by 30 centimetres (12 in) and filters zones, designed to minimise damage caused by seepage during a flood event, was placed on the downstream face.

== History ==
James Mulligan was the first European explorer and prospector to visit the tablelands in 1875. The area is now called the Atherton Tablelands after John Atherton who settled at Emerald End Station, at the junction of Emerald Creek and the Barron River. It is reported through popular legend that upon discovering alluvial tin at the headwaters of the creek, Atherton shouted "Tin, Harroo!!" to his prospecting mate.

In 1952, the Tinaroo Dam and Mareeba-Dimbulah Irrigation Scheme was approved by the Queensland Government. Construction on the dam was started in 1953 and completed in 1958, at a cost of A$12.666 million. When the dam was filled in 1959, the old township of Kulara near Yungaburra went underwater, and all of the residents relocated to Yungaburra and surrounding towns. The area around Kulara was among the last to flood when the dam filled. However, being on higher ground, the school building was not flooded and became a private residence at 85 Backshall Road (now in Barrine, 17.24420°S 145.58306°E).

Earlier the area of Danbulla, located on Robson's Creek – which also feeds into the lake, went underwater. Most of these residents relocated to the tablelands area as their farms were resumed.

== Water uses ==
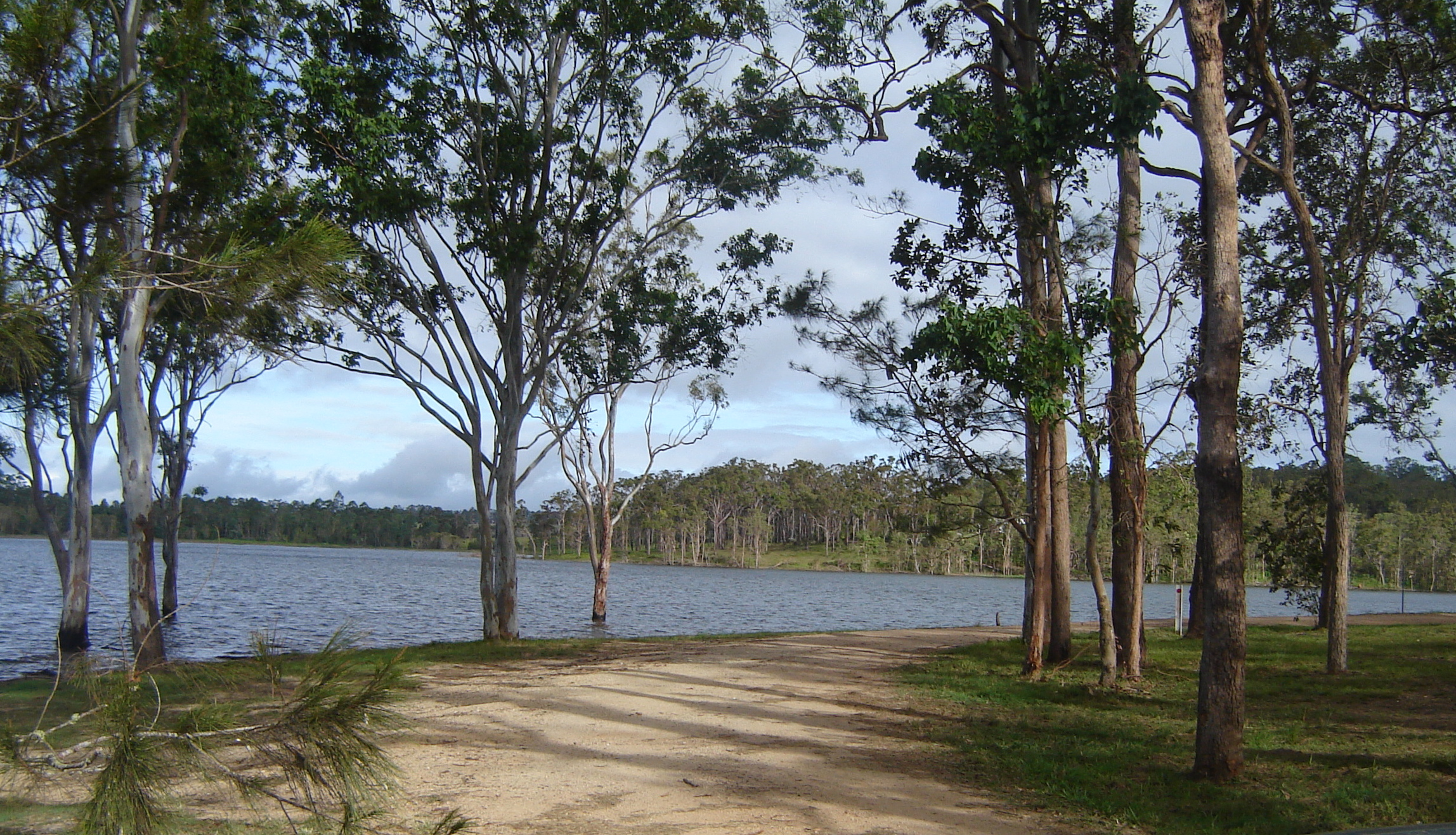
Lake Tinaroo

=== Irrigation ===
Covering almost 1,200 square kilometres (460 sq mi), the Mareeba-Dimbulah Irrigation Area is spread across the valleys of the Barron, Walsh and Mitchell Rivers. Some 415 square kilometres (160 sq mi) of farmland are irrigated by the lake when it supplies its 205,000 megalitres (7,200×10^{6} cu ft) of water each year. Farmers access this water from the extensive network of 176 kilometres (109 mi) of channels using either a gravity fed system or pumps. Areas not serviced by the channels can draw water from streams that have their water replenished by the Barron River, which, in turn, is fed by the lake.

=== Power generation ===
The Tinaroo Hydro Power Station became operational in 2004. It generates 1.6 megawatts (2,100 hp), thereby reducing 8,450 tonnes (8,320 long tons; 9,310 short tons) of carbon dioxide from entering the atmosphere each year. The dam is used to regulate the waterflow for use at the Barron Gorge Power Station, located 81 kilometres (50 mi) downstream from the dam wall.

=== Urban water supply ===
The townships of Tinaroo, Walkamin, Mareeba, Kuranda, and Yungaburra are supplied from Tinaroo Dam through the Barron River. The townships of Mutchilba and Dimbulah are also supplied by means of the irrigation channel system.

In 1952 the Queensland government approved construction at the dam on the Atherton tablelands in Far North Queensland. It took six years to build costing them 12 million dollars. The dam supplied so much water for the 1000 people that worked there. The dam was 44.5 metres tall. The supply level was 670 metres, and the length of storage was 15 kilometres long. There would have been 100 houses but now there is only 12 because it all has been swept away.

=== Recreation ===
Located on the picturesque Atherton Tableland, with the Tinaroo Range and the Danbulla State Forest surrounding it, Lake Tinaroo provides a popular tourist attraction and recreation facility. In 1997 and 1998 over 500,000 people a year visited the dam wall.

==== Water sports ====
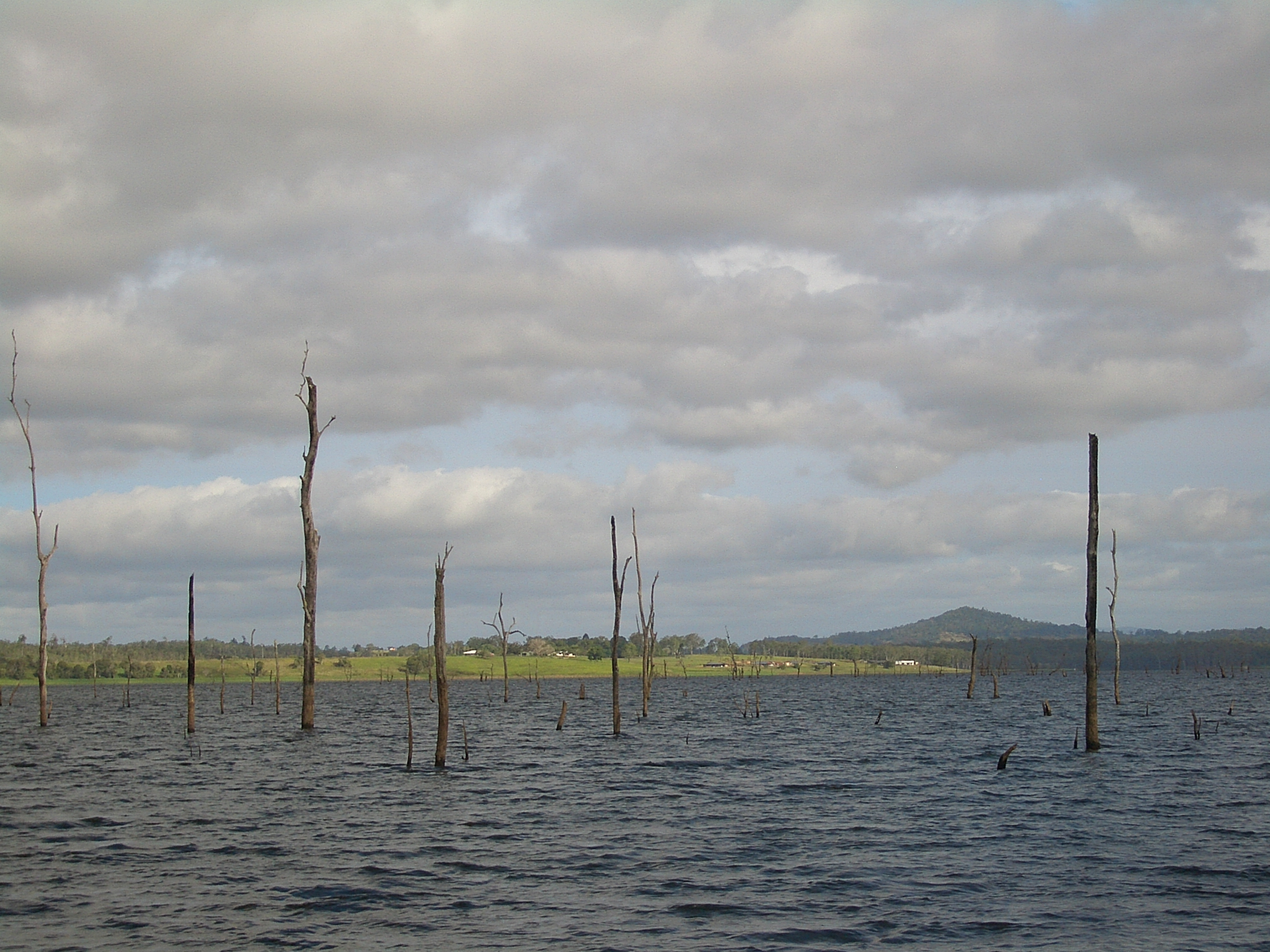
Lake Tinaroo with the tops of the drowned trees still rising above the water (June 2008)

With over 200 kilometres (120 mi) of shoreline, Lake Tinaroo offers many bays with smooth water that are protected from the wind. To this end, the lake is often used for sailing, water skiing, houseboating and swimming. During the drought of the last few years, some of the trees that were flooded during the dam's creation have become a hazard to boats because of the receding waters. Sunwater, the owners of the dam do not cut down trees due to safety hazards. Cutting trees at water level creates less visible submerged stumps as well as underwater obstructions which can float to areas that have been mapped as clear. Illegal tree clearing is reported to Atherton police and Maritime safety Queensland. There are still large areas of flooded vegetation, including trees and other man-made objects such as telephone poles, which stand around in the waters of the Lake. The degree of exposure varying with the water level.

==== Hiking ====
The lake is surrounded by national park, rainforest, pine tree plantations and Australian "bush". Hiking paths wind in and out of the mountains surrounding the lake and range from a pleasant walk from the parking lot to the water-front, to week-long treks around the lake and its mountains.

==== Fishing ====
Many species of fish and other aquatic animals populate the lake. The barramundi can grow to an enormous size in the lake because they have no natural predators. Each year, the lake is stocked with young barramundi from the Walkamin Research Station as the species is unable to breed in the lake due to the lack of access to salt water. Also present in Lake Tinaroo are eel-tailed catfish, sooty grunter, sleepy cod, mouth almighty, archer fish, spangled perch, long tom and many species of crayfish, including the red-claw and yabby.
A Stocked Impoundment Permit is required to fish in the dam.

Tilapia were illegally introduced into Lake Tinaroo and are now well established. They have been declared a noxious pest species and must be destroyed and buried if caught. It is illegal to possess, rear, sell or buy tilapia. It is also an offence to release tilapia into Queensland waterways or to use them as bait, live or dead.

== See also ==
- List of dams and reservoirs in Queensland
- List of hydroelectric power stations in Queensland
