= Lake Tinaroo, Queensland =

Lake Tinaroo
- Suburb
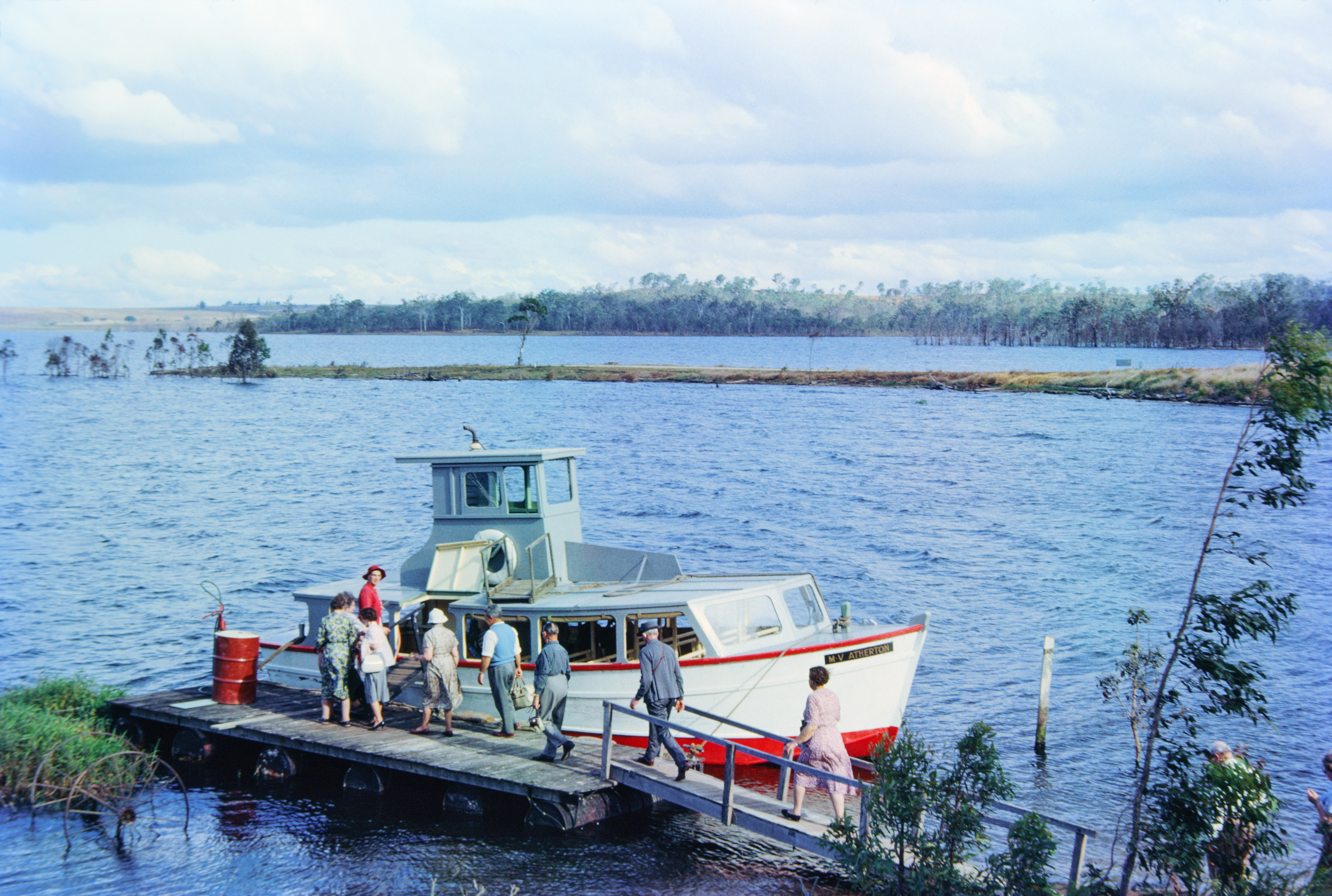
- Jetty, Lake Tinaroo, 1964

- Interactive map of Lake Tinaroo
- Coordinates: 17.1972°S 145.6269°E
- Country: Australia
- State: Queensland
- LGA: Tablelands Region
- Location: 15.4 km (9.6 mi) NE of Atherton; 29.4 km (18.3 mi) N of Malanda; 85.8 km (53.3 mi) SW of Cairns; 1,716 km (1,066 mi) NNW of Brisbane

Government
  - State electorate: Hill
  - Federal division: Kennedy

Area
  - Total: 37.5 km^{2} (14.5 sq mi)

Population
  - Total: 0 (2021 census)
  - Density: 0.000/km^{2} (0.00/sq mi)
- Time zone: UTC+10:00 (AEST)
- Postcode: 4872
Suburbs around Lake Tinaroo
Tinaroo	Danbulla	Danbulla
Kairi	Lake Tinaroo	Danbulla
East Barron	Yungaburra	Barrine

Lake Tinaroo is a rural locality in the Tablelands Region of Queensland, Australia. In the 2021 census, Lake Tinaroo had "no people or a very low population".

== Geography ==
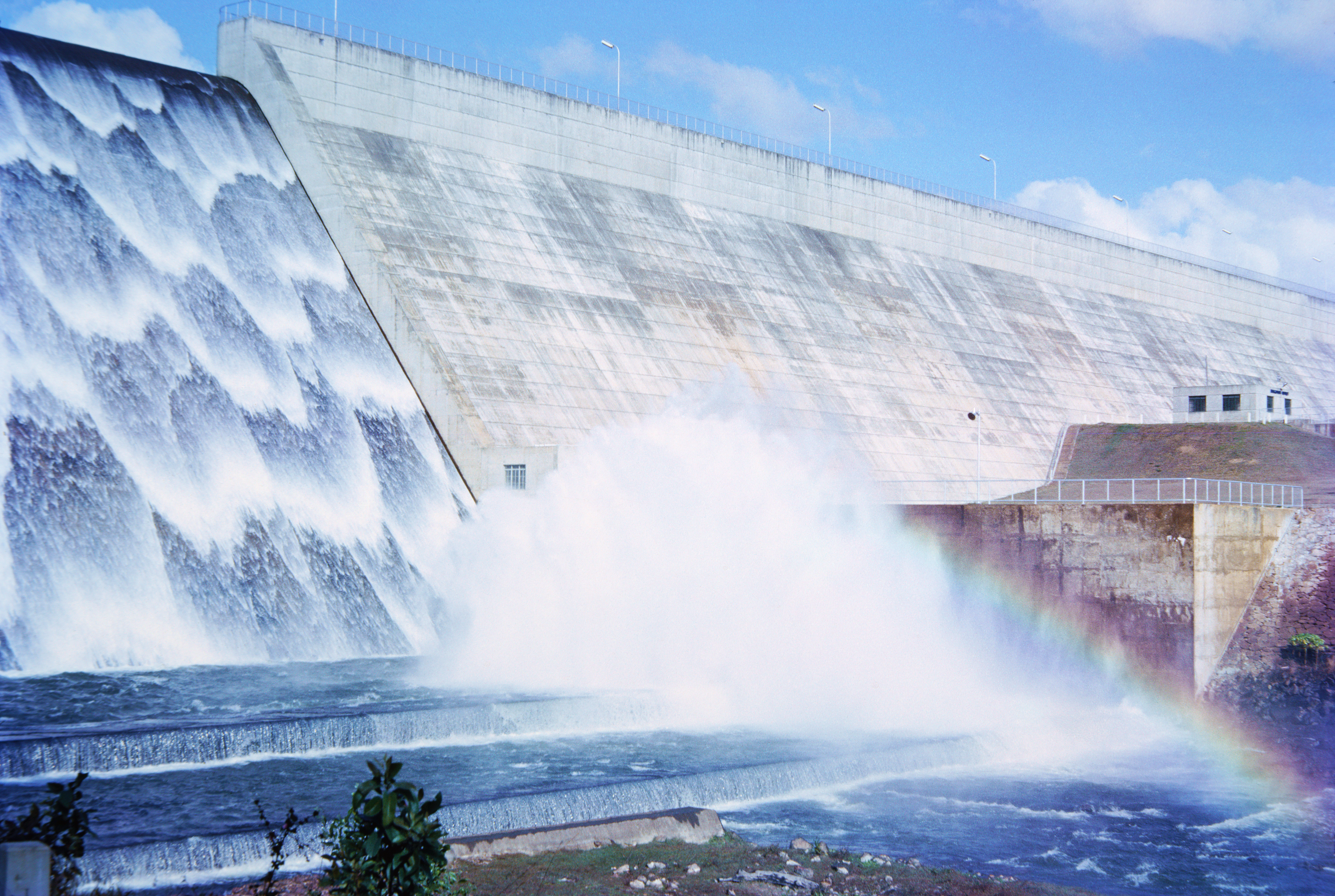
Tinaroo Dam Discharge, 1964

The locality includes the lake itself (also called Lake Tinaroo) created by the Tinaroo Falls Dam (17.16389°S 145.54639°E) as well as the foreshores of the lake and some of the creeks that flow into the lake. It is mostly a water locality with very little land.

The Barron River enters the locality from the south-west (Kairi / East Barron) and immediately becomes part of the lake. The river exits the lake at the Tinaroo Falls Dam in the west of the locality, flowing westward through Tinaroo and beyond.

== Demographics ==
In the 2016 census, Lake Tinaroo had "no people or a very low population".

In the 2021 census, Lake Tinaroo had "no people or a very low population".

== Education ==
Tinaroo Environmental Education Centre is an Outdoor and Environmental Education Centre at Black Gully Road (17.1822°S 145.5528°E).

There are no mainstream schools in the locality. The nearest government primary schools are Kairi State School in neighbouring Kairi to the west and Yungaburra State School in neighbouring Yungaburra to the south. The nearest government secondary schools are Atherton State High School in Atherton to the south-west and Malanda State High School in Malanda to the south. There are also non-government schools in Atherton.
