= SunWater =

Water company

Sunwater
- Company type: Government-owned corporation
- Industry: Water resources
- Headquarters: Brisbane, Australia
- Area served: Queensland
- Products: Water
- Services: From designing and building dams, managing and operating infrastructure
- Total assets: A$10 billion
- Parent: Government of Queensland
- Website: sunwater.com.au

Sunwater is a Queensland Government-owned statutory corporation that supplies bulk water to over 5,000 irrigation, industry and urban customers and water consultancy services to a range of institutional clients across regional Queensland, Australia.

Sunwater was established on 1 October 2000 pursuant to the Government Owned Corporations Act 1993 (QLD) and the Corporations Act 2001 (Cth)

== Function and activities ==
Sunwater is responsible for the operation and maintenance of 19 major dams, 65 weirs, 80 major pumping stations and more than 2,500 kilometres (1,600 mi) of pipelines and open channels. Water storage infrastructure managed by Sunwater includes:

- Burdekin Falls Dam
- Bjelke-Petersen Dam
- Kinchant Dam
- Wuruma Dam

Sunwater constructed, and owns and operates the Tinaroo Hydro Power Station, a mini–hydroelectric power station at Lake Tinaroo; and the Paradise Mini-Hydro, a mini–hydroelectric power station at Paradise Dam, impacted by flooding near Bundaberg in 2010.

== History ==
In 2003, there was a project underway to prevent interbasin transfer of the invasive fish species, Mozambique tilapia. The fish breeds rapidly and competes with native fish species. Sunwater planned to install mesh screens near irrigation channel outlets to prevent the escape of the fish.

== See also ==
- Queensland Water Commission
- seqwater
- Water security in Australia
- Water supply and sanitation in Australia
