= Kairi, Queensland =

Kairi
- Town
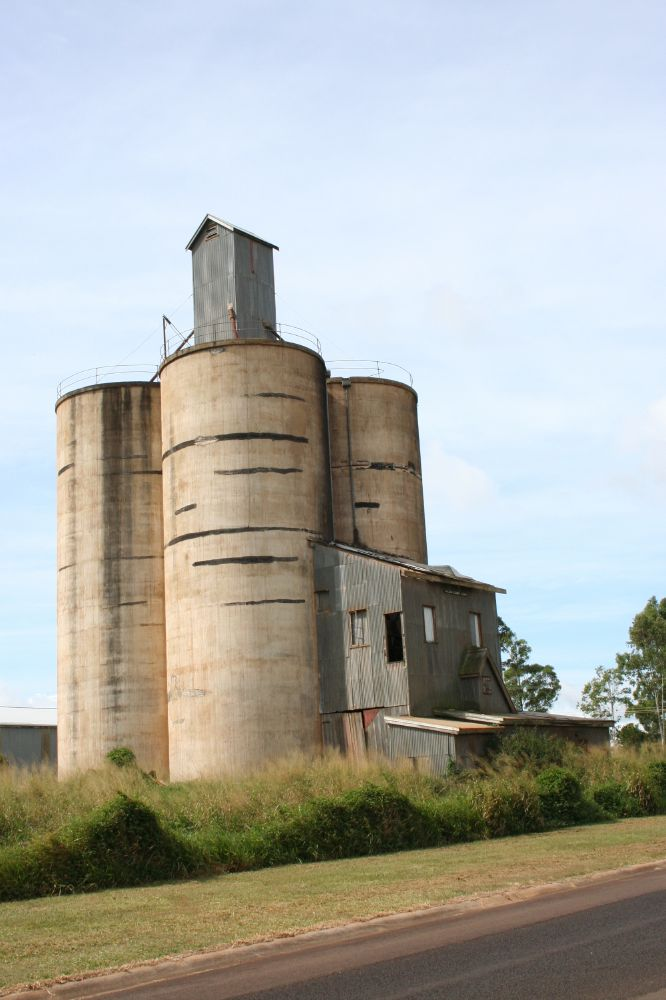
- Kairi Maize Silos, 2007

- Interactive map of Kairi
- Coordinates: 17.2155°S 145.5452°E
- Country: Australia
- State: Queensland
- LGA: Tablelands Region
- Location: 4 km (2.5 mi) S of Tinaroo; 12 km (7.5 mi) NW of Atherton; 84.1 km (52.3 mi) SW of Cairns; 1,698 km (1,055 mi) NNW of Brisbane

Government
  - State electorate: Hill
  - Federal division: Kennedy

Area
  - Total: 36.8 km^{2} (14.2 sq mi)
- Elevation: 697 m (2,287 ft)

Population
  - Total: 490 (2021 census)
  - Density: 13.32/km^{2} (34.5/sq mi)
- Time zone: UTC+10:00 (AEST)
- Postcode: 4872
- Mean max temp: 25.4 °C (77.7 °F)
- Mean min temp: 15.6 °C (60.1 °F)
- Annual rainfall: 1,300.5 mm (51.20 in)
Localities around Kairi
Tolga	Tinaroo	Lake Tinaroo
Tolga	Kairi	Lake Tinaroo
Atherton	East Barron	Lake Tinaroo

Kairi /ˈkɛəraɪ/ is a rural town and locality in the Tablelands Region, Queensland, Australia. In the 2021 census, the locality of Kairi had a population of 490 people.

== Geography ==
Kairi is on the Atherton Tableland in Far North Queensland. It is close to Lake Tinaroo and the closest more populous place is Tinaroo, which is 4 kilometres (2.5 mi) North of Kairi. It is 1,698 kilometres (1,055 mi) by road NNW from Brisbane and is 719 metres (2,359 ft) above sea level.

Kairi railway station is an abandoned railway station (17.2165°S 145.5413°E) on the now-closed Millaa Milla branch of the Tablelands railway line.

== Climate ==
Kairi has a dry-winter humid subtropical climate (Köppen: Cwa), with very warm and humid wet season from November to April and a pleasant dry season from May to October. Modified by its elevation, average maxima vary from 28.8 °C (83.8 °F) in December to 21.1 °C (70.0 °F) in July and average minima fluctuate between 19.5 °C (67.1 °F) in February and 11.2 °C (52.2 °F) in July. Mean average annual precipitation is 1,300.5 mm (51.20 in), spread between 94.0 precipitation days (above the 1.0 mm (0.039 in) threshold). Extreme temperatures have ranged from 38.9 °C (102.0 °F) on 6 January 1994 to −0.5 °C (31.1 °F) on 16 June 1978, 2 July 1984 and 3 August 1990.

Climate data for Kairi (17º13'12"S, 145º34'12"E, 717 m AMSL) (1913-2012 normals, extremes 1965-2011)
Month	Jan	Feb	Mar	Apr	May	Jun	Jul	Aug	Sep	Oct	Nov	Dec	Year
Record high °C (°F)	38.9 (102.0)	34.5 (94.1)	33.3 (91.9)	31.0 (87.8)	29.0 (84.2)	30.0 (86.0)	30.0 (86.0)	32.7 (90.9)	34.9 (94.8)	37.2 (99.0)	38.8 (101.8)	38.7 (101.7)	38.9 (102.0)
Mean daily maximum °C (°F)	28.2 (82.8)	27.6 (81.7)	26.4 (79.5)	24.8 (76.6)	23.0 (73.4)	21.5 (70.7)	21.1 (70.0)	22.5 (72.5)	24.8 (76.6)	27.2 (81.0)	28.4 (83.1)	28.8 (83.8)	25.4 (77.6)
Mean daily minimum °C (°F)	19.2 (66.6)	19.5 (67.1)	18.5 (65.3)	16.9 (62.4)	14.8 (58.6)	12.1 (53.8)	11.2 (52.2)	11.5 (52.7)	12.9 (55.2)	15.2 (59.4)	17.2 (63.0)	18.5 (65.3)	15.6 (60.1)
Record low °C (°F)	12.9 (55.2)	13.1 (55.6)	10.8 (51.4)	6.9 (44.4)	2.5 (36.5)	−0.5 (31.1)	−0.5 (31.1)	−0.5 (31.1)	2.5 (36.5)	5.5 (41.9)	8.6 (47.5)	10.3 (50.5)	−0.5 (31.1)
Average precipitation mm (inches)	254.2 (10.01)	270.3 (10.64)	256.6 (10.10)	100.9 (3.97)	57.3 (2.26)	38.0 (1.50)	27.2 (1.07)	24.3 (0.96)	18.5 (0.73)	31.3 (1.23)	74.6 (2.94)	137.3 (5.41)	1,300.5 (51.20)
Average precipitation days (≥ 1.0 mm)	12.2	13.0	12.7	11.1	8.5	6.3	5.0	4.2	3.4	3.6	5.5	8.5	94
Mean monthly sunshine hours	186.0	149.7	176.7	186.0	176.7	180.0	195.3	223.2	249.0	269.7	246.0	217.0	2,455.3
Percentage possible sunshine	46	42	47	53	50	54	56	62	69	70	63	53	55
Source: Bureau of Meteorology (1913-2012 normals, extremes 1965-2011)

== History ==
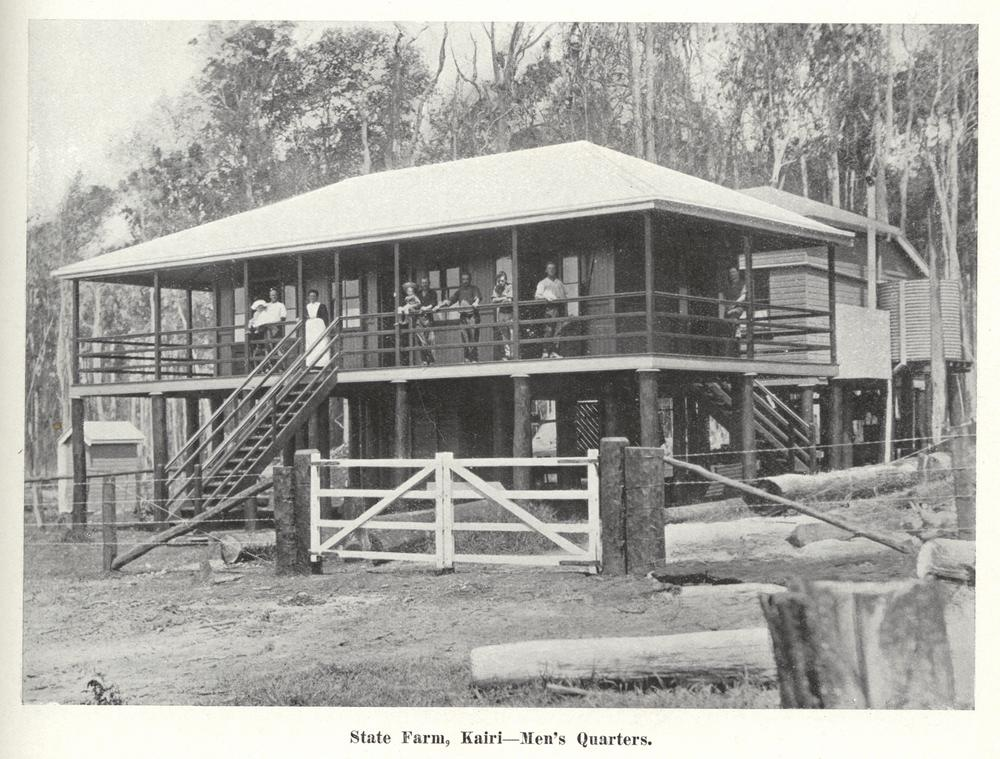
Men's quarters at Kairi State Farm, circa 1913

Yidinji (also known as Yidinj, Yidiny, and Idindji) is an Australian Aboriginal language. Its traditional language region is within the local government areas of Cairns Region and Tablelands Region, in such localities as Cairns, Gordonvale, and the Mulgrave River, and the southern part of the Atherton Tableland including Atherton and Kairi.

The establishment of a State Farm at Kairi by the Queensland Government was announced in May 1911. Fifty acres of land was initially cleared for the farm, which was to focus on dairying and pigs initially. Drummond MacPherson was transferred from his role as manager of the state farm at Biggenden to manage the Kairi State Farm. By March 1912, the state farm was growing maize, cow pea, rhodes grass, pumpkins, sugar melons and cucumbers. The State Farm closed in 1929, apart from the piggery which operated for a few years longer. From 1929, the farm was operated by commercial interests.

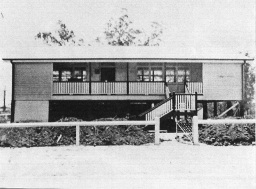
Kairi State School

Kairi State School opened on 24 July 1911 with 12 students under head teacher Leila May Higgins. The original proposed name for the school was Innesfail State School. In 1930, the school building was relocated to its current location by a bullock team. The new location was more central and near the railway crossing. After the relocation, an additional classroom was added.

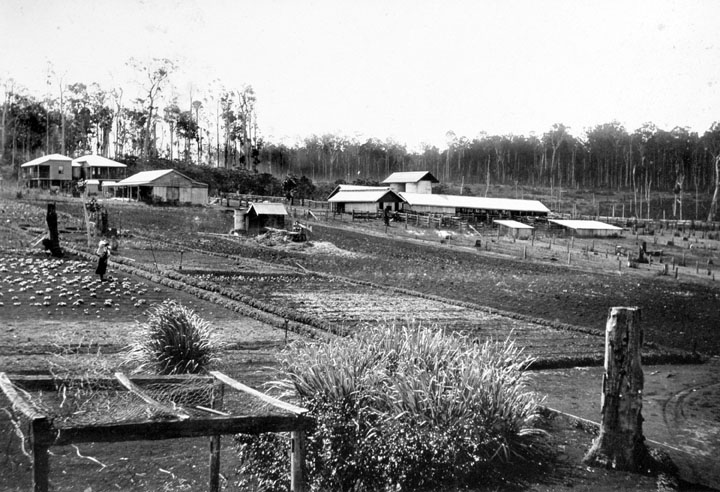
Kaira State Farm, circa 1930

In 1932, it was proposed that Kairi State Farm should become an agricultural college, focusing on the tropical agriculture of northern Queensland, while the Gatton Agricultural College would focus on the agriculture of southern Queensland. The idea of an agricultural college was very popular but little progress was made on actually establishing it. In 1944, the state farm was taken over by the Australian Army to supply vegetables and eggs for the armed forces during World War II. After the war in 1946, the state farm was used to establish a regional experimentation station to address the declining productivity of the soils on the Atherton Tableland. Although the end of the war brought renewed interest in establishing an agricultural college, it was announced in 1954 that there was no prospect of the college being established. In March 1962, the state farm became an official Research Station of the Queensland Department of Agriculture.

In October 2011, most of the land (209 hectares) of the former state farm / research station was sold by the Queensland Government, retaining only 26 hectares. The sale of the land was to fund the establishment of the Agri-Science Hub at Peters Street, Mareeba. The hub focusses on agricultural research and development, together with education and training. James Cook University is a partner of the hub, researching tropical agriculture, aquaculture and biosecurity.

== Demographics ==
In the 2006 census, the town of Kairi had a population of 193 people.

In the 2011 census, the locality of Kairi had a population of 460 people.

In the 2016 census, the locality of Kairi had a population of 442 people.

In the 2021 census, the locality of Kairi had a population of 490 people.

== Heritage listings ==
Kairi has a number of heritage-listed sites, including Kairi Maize Silos at 22 Godfrey Road.

== Education ==
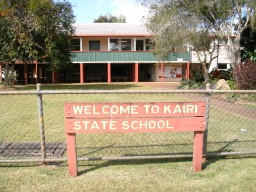
Kairi School

Kairi State School is a government primary (Prep-6) school for boys and girls in McGeehan Street (17.2151°S 145.5459°E). In 2015, it had an enrolment of 91 students with 6 teachers (5 full-time equivalent) and 5 non-teaching staff (3 full-time equivalent). In 2018, the school had an enrolment of 86 students with 8 teachers (5 full-time equivalent) and 8 non-teaching staff (5 full-time equivalent).

There are no secondary schools in Kairi. The nearest government secondary school is Atherton State High School in neighbouring Atherton to the south-west.
