= Mount Hypipamee National Park =

National park in Australia

- IUCN category II (national park)
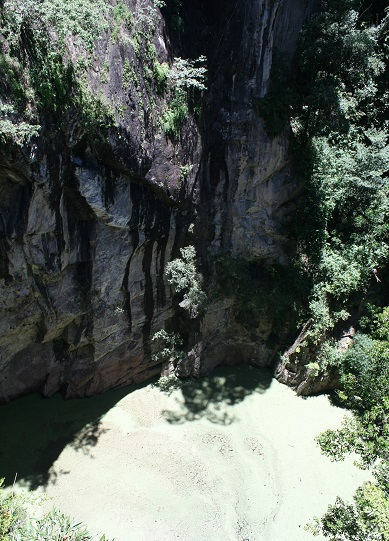

- Location within Queensland
- Location: Queensland
- Coordinates: 17°25′30″S 145°29′10″E
- Area: 3.64 km^{2} (1.41 sq mi)
- Established: 1939
- Governing body: Queensland Parks and Wildlife Service
- Website: Official website

Mount Hypipamee is a national park in Far North Queensland, Australia, 1,358 km northwest of Brisbane.

== See also ==
- Protected areas of Queensland
