= Danbulla National Park and State Forest =

National park in Queensland, Australia

Coordinates: 17°06′22″S 145°36′41″E

- IUCN category II (national park)
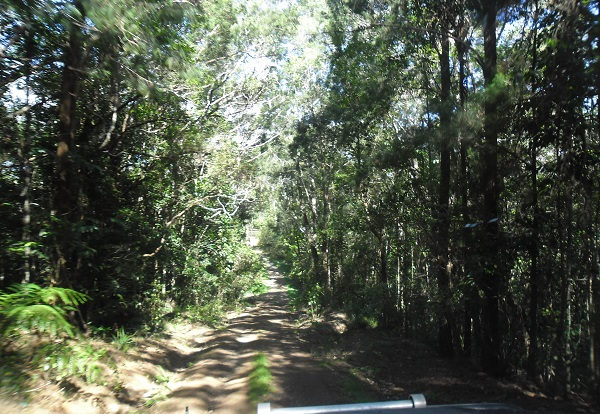
- Location: Queensland
- Governing body: Queensland Parks and Wildlife Service

Danbulla National Park and State Forest is a national park and state forest complex in Queensland, Australia, around 60 km west of Cairns.

The forest is spectacular and covers an area of 12,000 hectares, including eucalyptus, acacia and pine plantations.

The elevation of the terrain is 737 meters.

== See also ==
- Protected areas of Queensland
