= Barron River (Queensland) =

River in Queensland, Australia

Barron
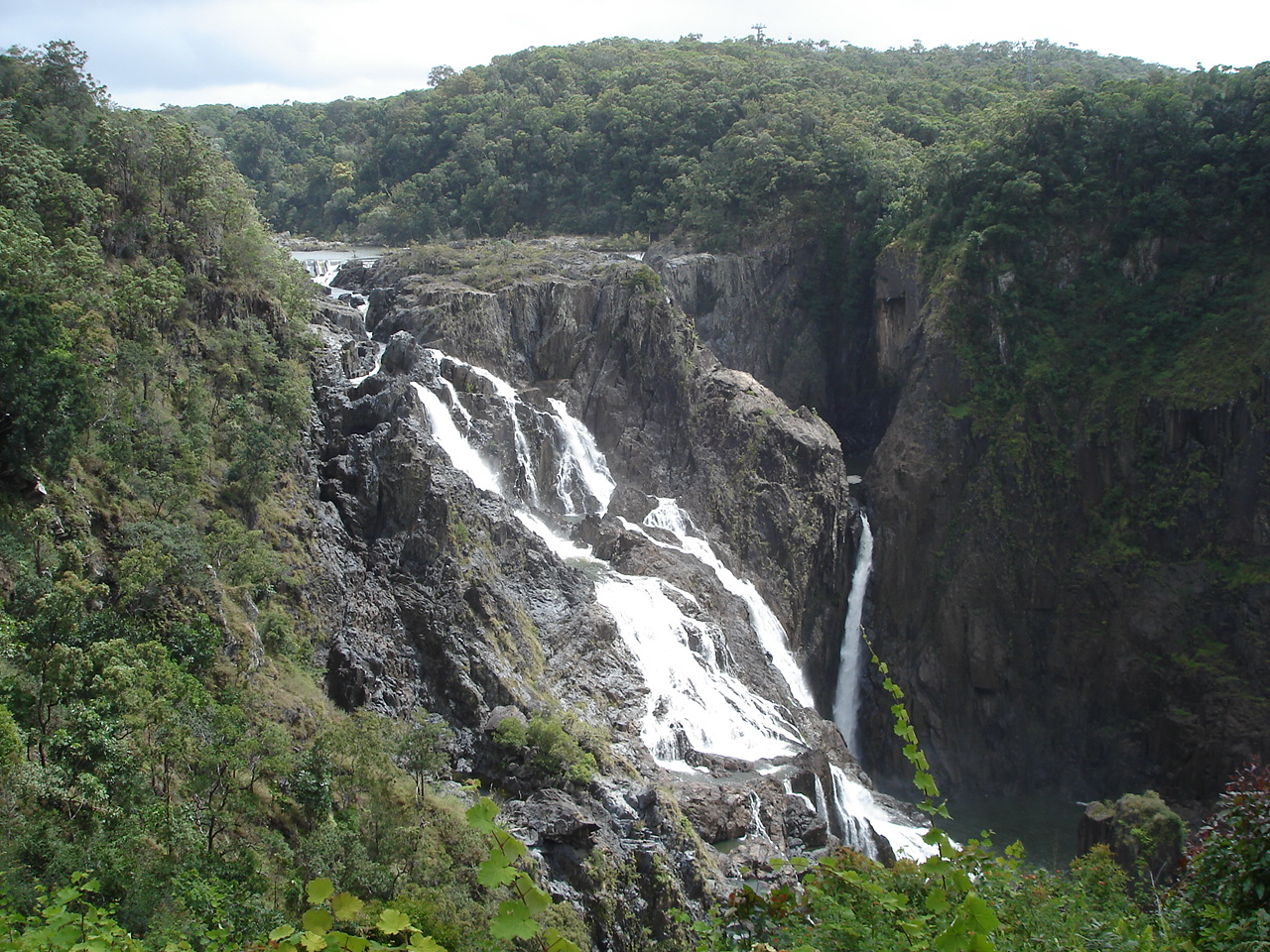
- The Barron Falls near Kuranda

- Location of Barron River river mouth in Queensland
- Etymology: In honour of Thomas Barron, a Brisbane chief clerk of police.

Location
- Country: Australia
- State: Queensland
- Region: Far North Queensland

Physical characteristics
- Source: Atherton Tablelands
  - location: Upper Barron
  - coordinates: 17.4544°S 145.4876°E
  - elevation: 1,200 m (3,900 ft)
- Mouth: Coral Sea
  - location: Machans Beach/Aeroglen
  - coordinates: 16.8633°S 145.7611°E
  - elevation: 0 m (0 ft)
- Basin size: 2,138 km^{2} (825 sq mi)
- Discharge
  - location: Near mouth
  - average: 29.4 m^{3}/s (930 GL/a)

Basin features
- Tributaries
  - left: Granite Creek (Queensland), Flaggy Creek
  - right: Peterson Creek (Queensland), Tinaroo Creek, Clohessy River
- Waterfalls: Barron Falls; Tinaroo Falls; Dinner Falls
- National parks: Herberton Range National Park; Mount Hypipamee National Park; Barron Gorge National Park

The Barron River rises on the Atherton Tablelands inland from Cairns in North Queensland, Australia. With its headwaters in Upper Barron, it flows through Lake Tinaroo, and the Barron Gorge, and eventually empties into the Coral Sea between Machans Beach and Aeroglen in Cairns.

== Geography ==
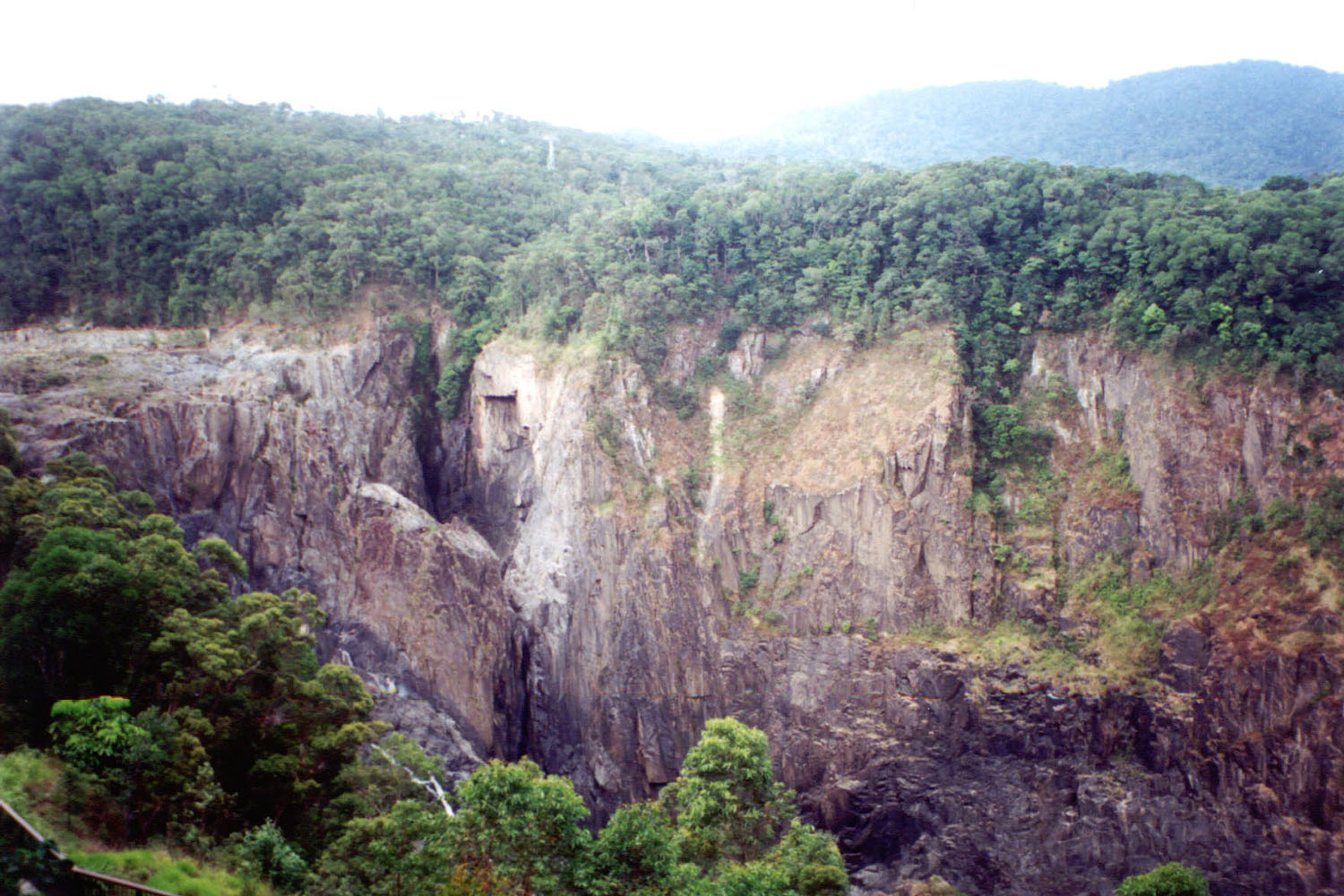
Barron Gorge

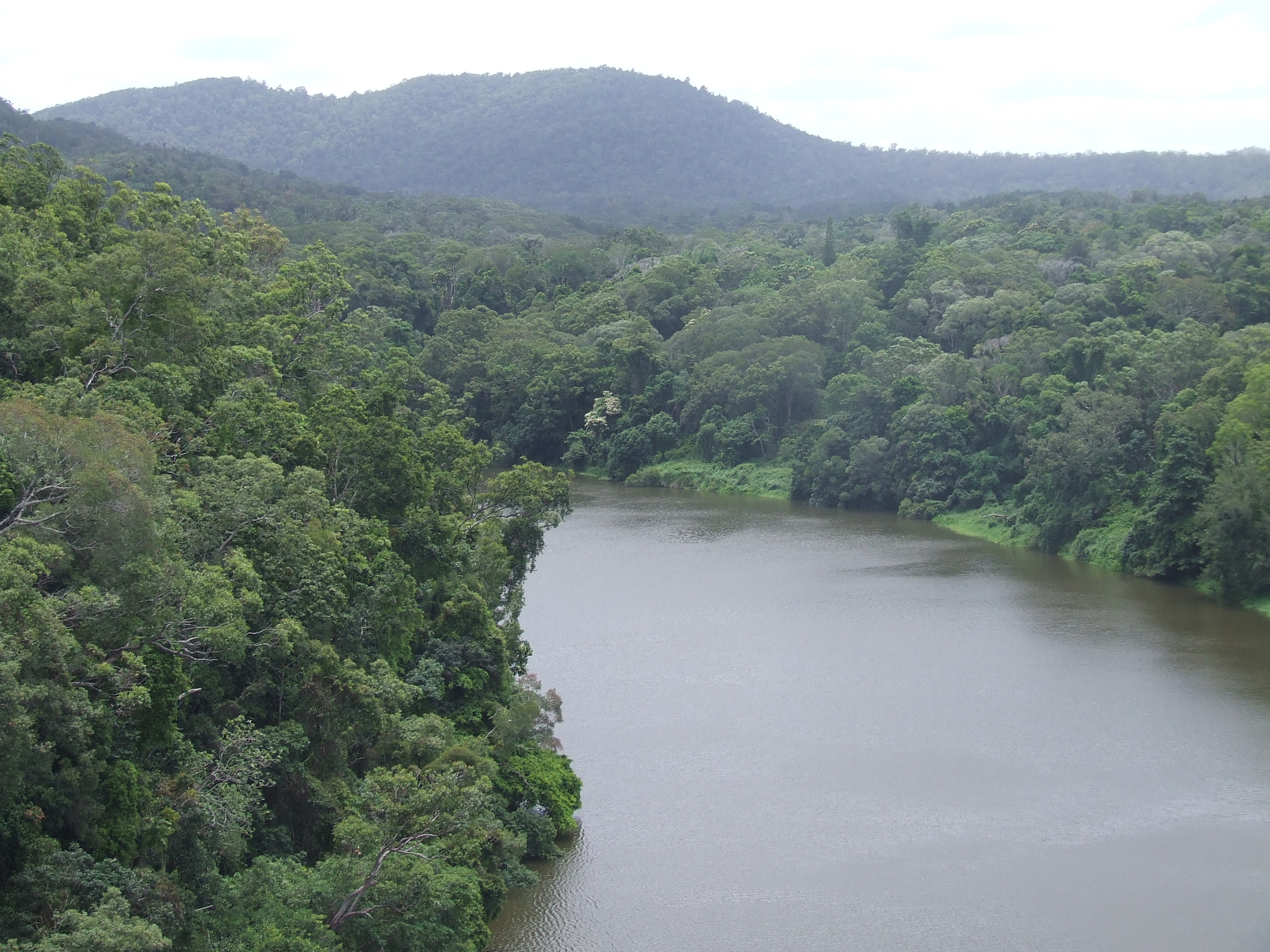
The reservoir of the Barron River behind the hydro-electro dam above the Barron Falls as viewed from a Skyrail gondola heading to Kuranda station.

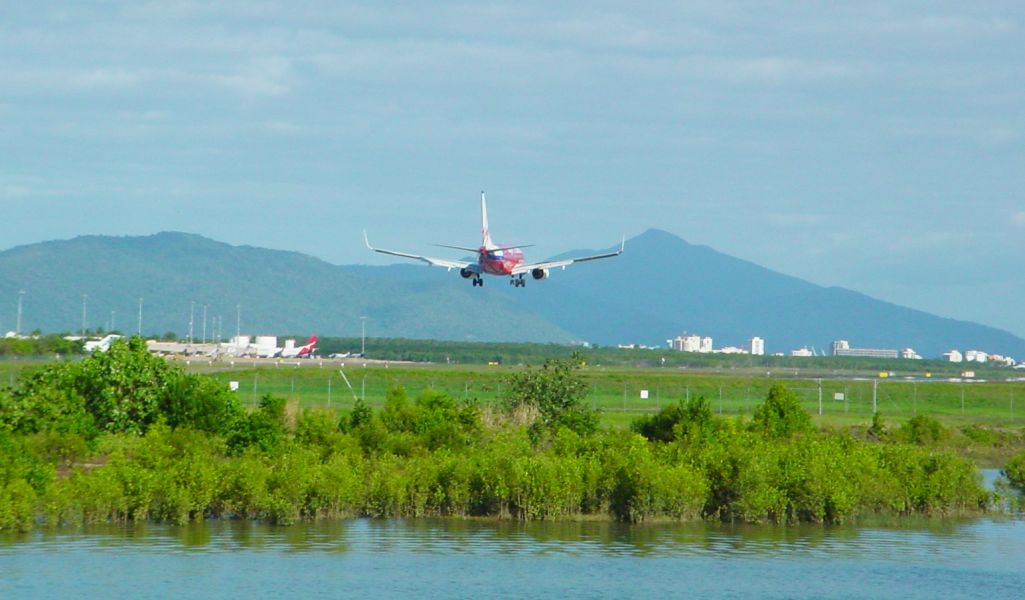
The mouth of the Barron River is just north of Cairns Airport

The Barron's headwaters commence in the Herberton Range National Park in the locality of Upper Barron (17.4544°S 145.4876°E) at an elevation of 1,200 metres (3,900 ft) and flow generally northward. The Dinner Falls are located along the upper Barron River within the locality of Upper Barron and the Mount Hypipamee National Park (17.4333°S 145.4833°E).

The river then flows in a north-north-easterly direction across the Atherton Tablelands until it arrives at Lake Tinaroo created by the Tinaroo Dam.

Below the dam wall, the river flows through the Tinaroo Falls (17.1700°S 145.5225°E).

After the waterfall, the river continues in a northernly direction before turning east after Mareeba towards Kuranda. After passing under the Kuranda Range Highway's bridge and through the town of Kuranda, the river plunges from the Atherton Tablelands down the 260-metre (850 ft)-high Barron Falls (16.8336°S 145.6433°E). Then the river passes through the Barron Gorge to the coastal plains below in the northern Cairns suburbs.

Much of the water that used to flow over the Barron Falls has now been diverted into upstream dams. Much of the water that does flow through the falls is used to generate electricity at the Barron Gorge Hydroelectric Power Station, which reduces the former grandeur of the falls.

Freshwater Creek joins the Barron River below the Gorge and drains Lake Morris and the Lamb and Whitfield Ranges.

Before entering the Coral Sea, the river's delta splits into three distributaries (from north to south)

- Thomatis/Richters Creek (16.8222°S 145.7330°E)
- Redden Creek (16.8554°S 145.7530°E)
- the main river channel (16.8633°S 145.7611°E)

Two other distributaries also operate during flooding – Barr Creek and Half Moon Creek.

The river is the sole source of sand for the beaches to the north of Cairns. Sand and gravel extraction from the river bed has supplied growing demand in the Cairns area. In the 1970s and 80s extraction rates reached 90,000 cubic metres (3,200,000 cu ft) per year, which was twice the replenishment rate at the mouth. This has resulted in considerable beach erosion to the north.

== History ==
There is a theory that over time, some of the Mitchell River's former headwaters were diverted by natural forces into the Barron River. These include the Clohesy River and other tributaries that used to flow northwest to the Gulf of Carpentaria. With the extra water now flowing over the 260-metre (850 ft)-high Barron Falls, the steep, narrow Barron Gorge was formed.

The European discovery of the river was by James Venture Mulligan in 1875. In 1875 two police sub-inspectors, Robert Arthur Johnstone and Alexander Douglas-Douglas, named it after Thomas Henry Bowman Barron (circa 1835 – 24 June 1882), chief clerk of police in Brisbane.

The lower reaches of the Barron River have a well-documented history of flooding dating from early 1900s. Both agricultural and residential areas can be affected.

Thomatis Creek has only been connected to the Barron River since 1932 and has been responsible for diverting part of the flow from the river.

Heavy rain associated with a cyclone early in 1939 caused substantial flooding on the Barron River and resulted in the river changing its course. The mouth of the Barron moved about 2 kilometres (1.2 mi) north from Casuarina Point on the northern Cairns esplanade to Ellie Point.

Some of the river's worst flooding occurred in 1950 when a major tropical cyclone followed the contour of the Queensland coast for over a week.

The Tinaroo Dam commenced construction in 1953 and was completed in 1858, creating Lake Tinaroo. The dam was first one built in Queensland with the primary purposes of supplying irrigation to farms, then mostly growing tobacco but now growing a wider variety of crops. It is one of the three largest water reservoirs in Queensland. The Tinaroo Dam does little to mitigate flooding which mainly occurs downstream.

The river gives its name to the electoral district of Barron River, a division of the Queensland Legislative Assembly formed in 1971.

A network of rainfall and river height field stations was established in 1995 to provide a flood warning system for the Cairns City Council.

Rainfall records were broken in December 2023 when Cyclone Jasper crossed the coast. It resulted in non-stop torrential rain for 48 hours after the system stalled over southern Cape York Peninsula. At Myola a peak of 14.09 metres was recorded. The suburbs of Holloways Beach, Machans Beach and Yorkeys Knob were particularly hard hit by flooding.

== Fauna ==
The stocking of exotic sports fish into the river has led to a serious decline in the diversity and abundance of native fish.

A total of 63 species of fish have been found in the river, including the glassfish, barred grunter, Snub-nosed Garfish, Fly-specked hardyhead, Mouth almighty, Bigeye Trevally, Goby, Jungle Perch, oxeye herring, eastern rainbowfish, Bony bream, Spotted scat, Giant gudgeon, Freshwater Longtom and Seven-spot Archerfish.

== Tourism ==
Tinaroo Dam and Lake Tinarro are popular for camping, fishing, waterskiing, and bushwalking.

The Barron Falls are a popular tourist attraction and are often viewed from the Kuranda Scenic Railway and the Skyrail, both of which have stopping places for viewing and photography.

== See also ==
- List of rivers of Australia § Queensland
- William Walter Mason Bridge
