= Bank of New South Wales building =

Bank of New South Wales building may refer to:

- Bank of New South Wales building, Brisbane, Queensland
- Bank of New South Wales building, Charters Towers, Queensland
- Bank of New South Wales building, Gympie, Queensland
- Bank of New South Wales building, Helidon, Queensland
- Bank of New South Wales building, Maryborough, Queensland, now Maryborough Heritage Centre
- Bank of New South Wales building, Melbourne, Victoria, the bank's head office
- Bank of New South Wales building, Normanton, Queensland, now Westpac Bank building
- Bank of New South Wales building, Townsville, Queensland, also known as Australian Meat Industry Employees Union
- Bank of New South Wales building, Yungaburra, Queensland
