= Eden House Restaurant =

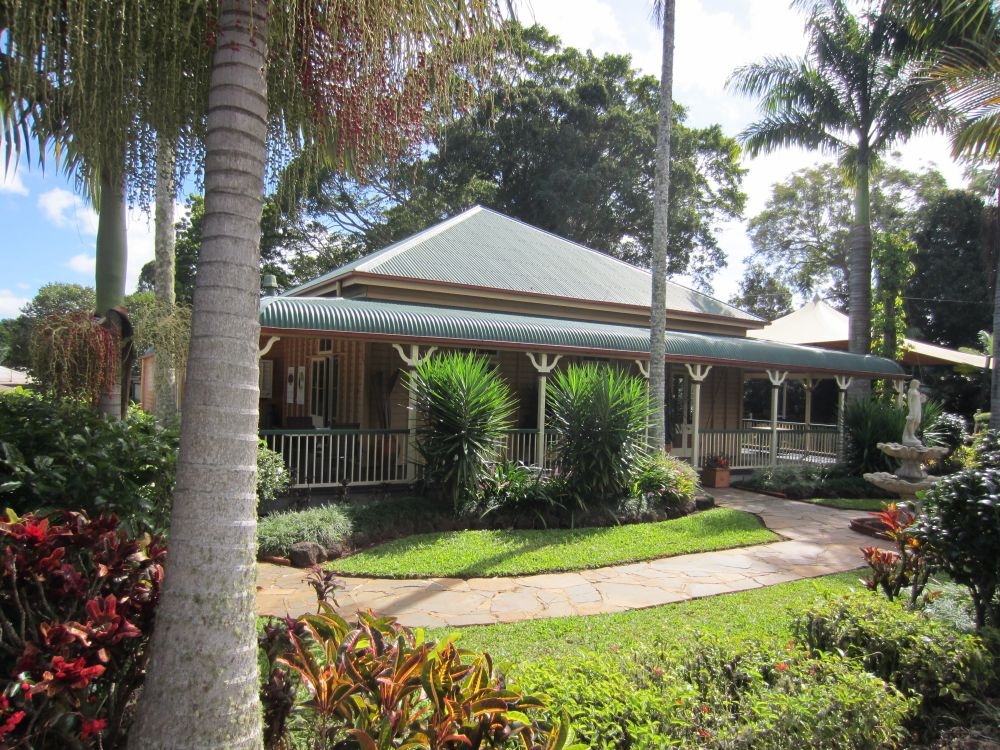
- Eden House Restaurant, 2015

- Location within Queensland Location within Australia
- 17.2714°S 145.5824°E
- Location: 20 Gillies Highway, Yungaburra, Tablelands Region, Queensland, Australia

History
- Design period: 1900–1914 (early 20th century)
- Built: c. 1914

Queensland Heritage Register
- Official name: Eden House Restaurant, Nibbles Tea House/Restaurant, Private residence
- Type: state heritage (landscape, built)
- Designated: 21 October 1992
- Reference no.: 600467
- Significant period: 1910s (fabric); 1910s–1920s (historical, social)
- Significant components: residential accommodation – main house, well, trees/plantings

Eden House Restaurant is a heritage-listed detached house at 20 Gillies Highway, Yungaburra, Tablelands Region, Queensland, Australia. It was built c. 1914. It is also known as Nibbles Tea House. It was added to the Queensland Heritage Register on 21 October 1992.

== History ==
Eden House Restaurant was constructed reportedly c. 1914 originally as a private residence for Arthur (Archie) Herbert Belson, an Atherton Tableland timber merchant, and whose brother was the first Chairman of the Eacham Shire Council in 1911.

Yungaburra, previously known as Allumbah (meaning red cedar) Pocket, was surveyed in 1886 by Surveyor Rankin as part of a government village settlement scheme. In 1910, the Cairns to Millaa Millaa railway reached the town, which was renamed to avoid confusion with another similarly named town. In 1926, the Gillies Highway between Cairns and Gordonvale was opened. Fuelled by the resulting tourist trade to the nearby lakes, the town experienced a second period of development.

The land on which Eden House is located was alienated from the Crown by George Henry O'Donnell in September 1899. Mr O'Donnell subdivided the property, and the land was transferred to Arthur Herbert Belson in April 1912.

The house was reportedly named Cedrella when constructed, and was later described as having wide verandahs, a tennis court and "Old English" gardens. The house was very much a social centre of the district, and was transferred to Mr Belson's son-in-law George Alfred Duffy in July 1922, who later became the local Member of the Queensland Legislative Assembly.

The property was transferred to Martin Rudolf Lehfeldt in December 1929, and in June 1930 a Deed of Grant was issued. The property was then transferred to Albert Edwards in March 1948.

The property was later transferred to Alfred and Alice King in January 1958, who came to Yungaburra c. 1954 to run the Tivoli cinema, which is now the Yungaburra Community Centre. Mr King died in 1964, and the house was occupied by Mrs King (who changed her name to Alice Baszel Jones - spinster - in June 1964) until her death, after which it was sold at auction. The property was transferred in October 1988 to Mitojo Pty Ltd and RM and AB Payne Pty Ltd (associated with a Cairns solicitor).

The house was substantially rebuilt over a two-year period and redeveloped for use as a restaurant. Photographs taken during this work show the only surviving original material being the external walls (reportedly cedar) to the front of the building, some internal walls, some doors and windows, and the floor. However, the house was rebuilt to look substantially similar to the original structure. An addition was constructed at the rear, which houses toilets and kitchens.

The building was operated by lessees as "Nibbles Tea House", until it was transferred to the current owners in August 1998. The current owners have undertaken some works, including a large dining deck one the northern side, have developed the gardens, and reopened the premises as "Eden House" in October 1998.

== Description ==
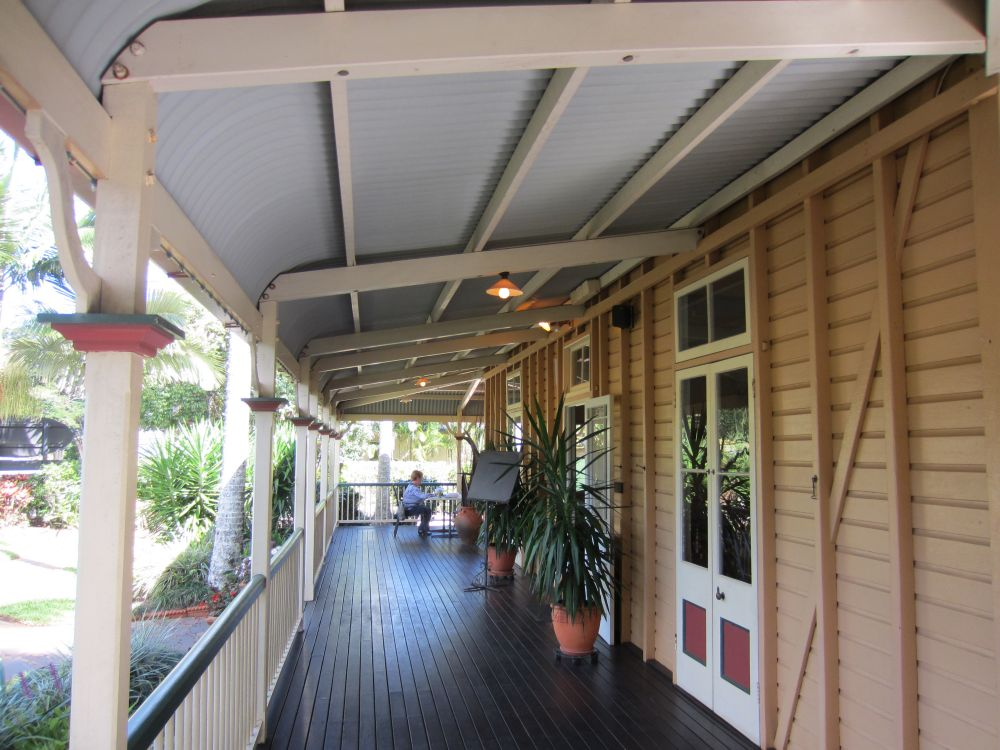
Verandah, 2015

Eden House Restaurant is a single-storeyed timber structure with a corrugated metal hipped roof and bullnosed verandahs to three sides. The building fronts the Gillies Highway to the east, and is surrounded by landscaped grounds.

The building presents a symmetrical elevation to the street, with a central entrance flanked by French doors with fanlights opening to the verandahs to three sides. The verandahs have timber posts, dowel balustrades and curved brackets. The verandah walls are of single-skin horizontal boards with exposed framing, and the building has timber stumps.

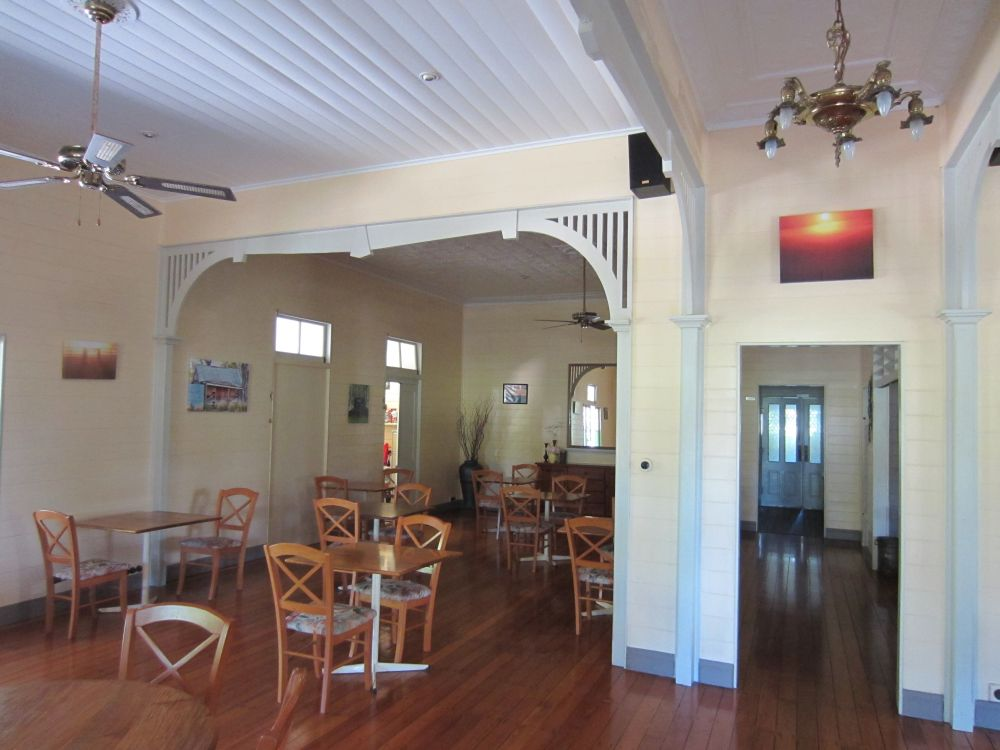
Dining area, 2015

Internally, the front section of the house is used for dining, and several internal walls have been removed, and decorative arched timber details inserted. A section of the central corridor survives, with decorative pressed metal ceiling and cornices, and rooms to either side have pressed metal or boarded ceilings.

A single-storeyed addition at the rear houses kitchen and toilet facilities, and a large timber dining deck with curved awning has been constructed on the northern side of the building.

The grounds have been landscaped, but contain a number of substantial mature trees, and the remains of an early well. The site has a driveway on the southern side accessing the rear of the property, and a timber picket fence to the street.

== Heritage listing ==
Eden House Restaurant was listed on the Queensland Heritage Register on 21 October 1992 having satisfied the following criteria.

The place is important in demonstrating the evolution or pattern of Queensland's history.

Eden House Restaurant is important in demonstrating the pattern of development of Yungaburra and the Atherton Tablelands. The building was constructed as a substantial private residence reportedly c.1914 during the town's first phase of development following the arrival of the Cairns to Milla Milla railway in 1910.

The place is important because of its aesthetic significance.

Eden House Restaurant contains the remains of the original house, and together with its substantial mature plantings, makes a strong aesthetic contribution to the Yungaburra townscape.

The place has a special association with the life or work of a particular person, group or organisation of importance in Queensland's history.

The house was constructed for Mr Arthur (Archie) Herbert Belson, a Tableland timber merchant, whose brother was the first Chairman of the Eacham Shire Council. The house was later transferred to his son-in-law Mr George Alfred Duffy who became the local State Member of Parliament. The property was later transferred to the King family who were long-time operators of the local Tivoli cinema, now the community centre. During the early twentieth century, the house was described as being "very much a social centre of the district".
