= St Patrick's Church, Yungaburra =

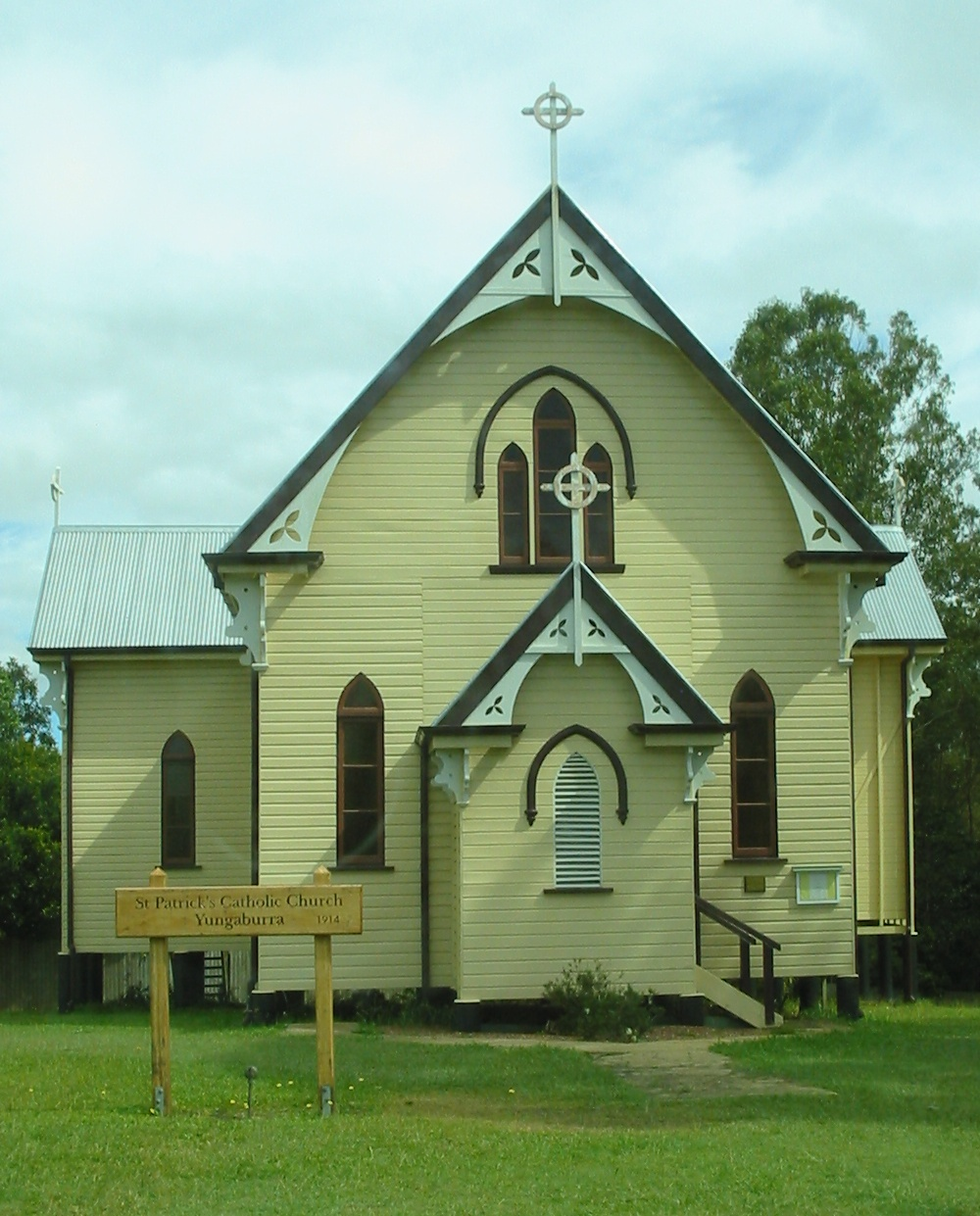
- St Patrick's Catholic Church, 2007
- St Patrick's Church, Yungaburra
- 17°16′07″S 145°34′50″E
- Address: 1 Penda Street, Yungaburra, Tablelands Region, Queensland
- Country: Australia
- Denomination: Roman Catholic
- Website: cairns.catholic.org.au/parishes/malanda

History
- Status: Church
- Dedication: Saint Patrick

Architecture
- Architectural type: Church
- Years built: 1914–1930s

Administration
- Diocese: Cairns
- Parish: Malanda

Queensland Heritage Register
- Official name: St Patrick's Catholic Church, Our Lady of Ransom
- Type: State heritage (built)
- Designated: 21 October 1992
- Reference no.: 600488
- Significant period: 1914, 1930s (fabric)
- Significant components: Furniture/fittings, tower – bell / belfry, church, residential accommodation – presbytery, memorial – plaque

St Patrick's Church is a heritage-listed Roman Catholic church at 1 Penda Street, Yungaburra, Tablelands Region, Queensland, Australia. It was built from 1914 to 1930s. It is also known as Our Lady of Ransom. The church is part of the Roman Catholic Diocese of Cairns. It was added to the Queensland Heritage Register on 21 October 1992.

== History ==
St Patrick's church is located on a ridge at the intersection of what were two major roads marking the original village settlement of Allumbah. It was built in 1914 and was the first Catholic church in the area, Mass previously having been said in William's hall.

The first Europeans on the Atherton Tablelands were engaged in timbergetting and mining, but the rich soil and cool climate were thought particularly suitable for the development of agriculture. In 1885 a Village Settlement scheme was introduced which offered settlers 40 acre farm blocks with home sites clustered as a village. In 1888 a village settlement was laid out at Allumbah Pocket, later to become Yungaburra. At the same time the Tablelands railway from the port of Cairns to the Tableland was begun, although it took far longer to reach its objective than originally envisaged. The first farms at Allumbah were taken up in 1891 and a street developed along the ridge at Allumbah where the church is situated. However, without proximity to markets and reliable transport, the scheme was not successful. The Roman Catholic Vicariate of Cooktown, serving North Queensland, was established in 1877 and was first staffed largely by Italians. At the time, most of the Roman Catholics in North Queensland were Irish miners and in 1884 the Irish Province of the Order of Saint Augustine agreed to take on the work of the Vicariate which was struggling to serve a scattered population of Catholics in a vast area with very few priests. Herberton was one of five centres in North Queensland at which priests were appointed. In the 1890s a slump in ore prices adversely affected the economy of mining towns and the population of the Tablelands began to drift toward new agricultural areas such as Yungaburra.

The railway reached Mareeba in 1895 and Atherton in 1903, greatly improving access to the area. Following new Land Acts in the early 1900s to encourage closer settlement which had more practical requirements, more people took up land around Allumbah. A small township developed to service the area and in 1910, the railway line linking Cairns with the Tablelands reached Allumbah, which was then renamed Yungaburra to avoid confusion with another similarly named town. The Post Office Directory for this year lists almost all residents as "selectors." A period of rapid development began with the construction of a sawmill, a hotel and a number of shops and houses near the new Yungaburra railway station. In 1911 the tiny St Marks Anglican Church was constructed, the first Methodist services were held in Yungaburra and the Eacham Shire was formed. The Catholics of Yungaburra were served by the priest from Herberton who visited on a monthly basis. Services were held in homes or in the hall attached to the Williams hotel.

The land on which the church was built was originally granted to George O'Donnell and was bought in 1900 by George Wedderburn. In 1914 work began on a new church on part of Wedderburn's land. It was well located at the juncture of the stock route, the main road to the coast and the road to Atherton. The church was officially opened on 26 April 1914 by Bishop James Murray as Our Lady of Ransom. The opening was a gala occasion and people travelled considerable distances to attend, many travelling on special excursion trains from Herberton and Mareeba. The resultant crowds filled the new church to capacity. The first wedding in the church was held only 3 days after the opening and was that of Maud Williams, who managed the new hotel, and Jack Kehoe, the local stationmaster. The first priest serving the church was Father Patrick Bernard Doyle and in 1915 title to the church land was placed in the names of Doyle and Bishop John Heavey.

Father Doyle was a deeply spiritual man who was held in great affection and respect by his parishioners. He was born in Ireland in 1874 and joined the order of Saint Augustine in 1893. In 1899 he came to serve in north Queensland as assistant priest, then parish priest, at Cairns. In 1906 he was appointed to Herberton where he stayed, with a return to Cairns for a year between 1908 and 1909, until his death in 1924. He served various churches in his parish, besides teaching and playing sport at the Sisters of Mercy school in Herberton. After his untimely death, the church was named St Patrick's in his memory and a plaque notes that the bell tower is dedicated to him.

In 1926, the Gillies Highway between Yungaburra and Gordonvale was opened, providing the first trafficable road to the Tablelands. Yungaburra became a gateway to the natural attractions of the area and a blossoming tourist trade to the nearby lakes created a second period of development. The road also made the church more accessible and Mass was celebrated twice a month. There were never enough Catholics in and around Yungaburra to support an incumbent priest.

Changes to the church over time have been minor and reflect the changes in liturgical practice following the Second Vatican Council called by Pope John XXIII in the 1960s. These include the removal of the confessional box, the relocation of the altar rails and the separation of the altar table from the back of the altar to allow the priest to face the congregation. The southern side of the entrance porch has been enclosed, presumably to shield it from the weather.

A house was moved onto the northern corner of the site fronting Mulgrave Road in 1996, for use as a presbytery and has toilets underneath. The house was originally located on the corner of Loeven and Severin Streets in Cairns and was then approximately 50–60 years old.

== Description ==
St Patrick's is set on a grassed area on a ridge of high land overlooking the park-like plantings running down Eacham Road, originally a stock route. It is bounded to the east by Mulgrave Road and on the south east by Penda Street.

St Patrick's is a single-storeyed timber church with exposed framing set on concrete stumps. It has a gabled roof clad with corrugated iron and is cruciform in plan. The church is entered through a gabled entry porch below a triple lancet window assembly. The front wall of the building has chamferboard cladding. The roof has decorative timber brackets at the eaves and fretwork panels to the gable ends.

Inside the roof is supported by timber trusses and is lined with diagonal boarding. The interior is simply finished and retains the original pews and much of the original furniture.

There is a freestanding steel-framed bell tower located at the eastern corner of the site. The memorial plaque at the base reads:

Erected to the memory of Revd. P.B. Doyle, O.S.A. Died 16 November 1924 A Sincere Friend And a Faithful Priest R.I.P.

The relocated presbytery is located at northern corner of the site fronting Mulgrave Road. It is a single-storeyed dwelling set on stumps with hipped roof clad in corrugated iron. The walls are clad in corrugated iron and the verandah is partially enclosed by with timber louvres. The house contains 3 main rooms, with a bathroom and kitchen at either end of the enclosed verandah.

== Heritage listing ==
St Patricks Catholic Church was listed on the Queensland Heritage Register on 21 October 1992 having satisfied the following criteria.

The place is important in demonstrating the evolution or pattern of Queensland's history.

St Patrick's Church was built in 1914 and is associated with the early development of the Atherton Tablelands and the growth of the Catholic Church in North Queensland. The church marks the site of the original Allumbah Pocket settlement, the commercial focus of the township having moved towards the railway when it arrived in 1910.

The place is important in demonstrating the principal characteristics of a particular class of cultural places.

St Patrick's Church is a good and intact example of a rural timber church of it era.

The place is important because of its aesthetic significance.

In its form, scale and detail it makes a substantial visual contribution to the built character of Yungaburra.

The place has a strong or special association with a particular community or cultural group for social, cultural or spiritual reasons.

St Patrick's Church has a strong connection with the Catholic community of the Yungaburra area, having served the village and surrounding farms since the early years of the 20th century. It also has a strong association with the life and work of Father Patrick Doyle, OSA, and the work of the Augustinian order in the spread of Catholicism in North Queensland.
