= YFF =

YFF or Yff may refer to:

- Penticton Regional Airport (IATA: YFF), airport in Penticton, British Columbia, Canada
- Peter Yff, mathematician

- Yff center of congruence, special point associated to a triangle
- Yff conics, family of conics associated to a triangle

- Yerkes Future Foundation, nonprofit owning the Yerkes Observatory in Williams Bay, Wisconsin, United States
- Yorkton Film Festival, annual film festival in Yorkton, Saskatchewan, Canada
- The Young Fresh Fellows, American alternative rock band
- Yunfeng Financial, Chinese financial services company
- Yungaburra Folk Festival, former name of the Tablelands Folk Festival in Yungaburra, Queensland, Australia
