= 7-9 Cedar Street, Yungaburra =

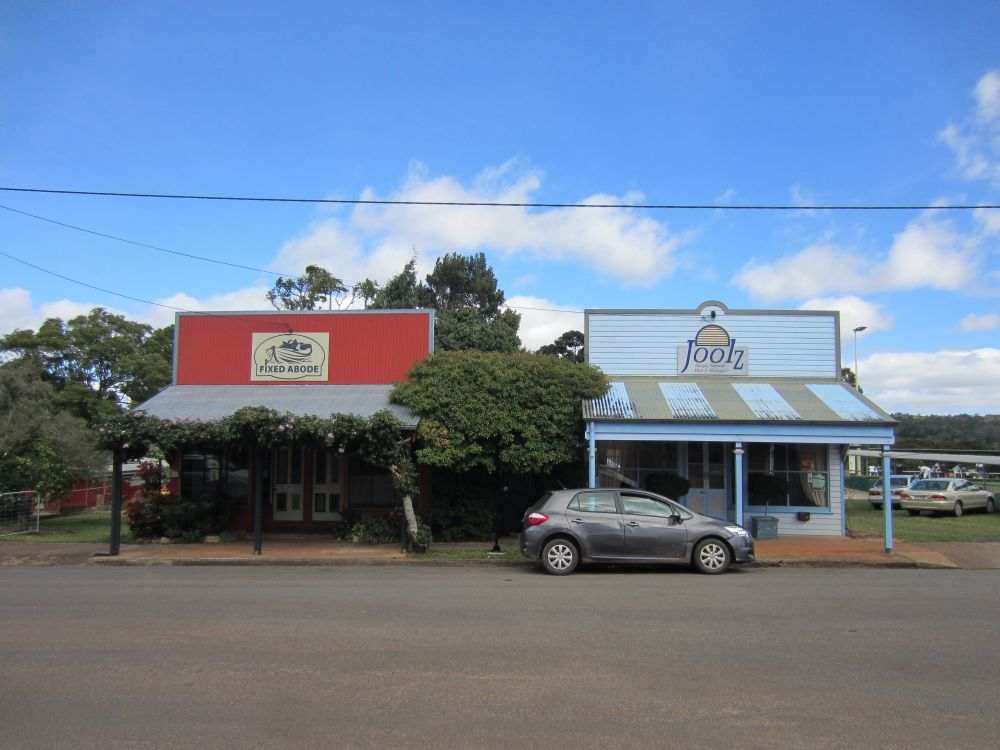
- 7–9 Cedar Street, 2015

- Location within Queensland Location within Australia
- 17.2707°S 145.5823°E
- Location: 7–9 Cedar Street, Yungaburra, Tablelands Region, Queensland, Australia

History
- Design period: 1919–1930s (interwar period)
- Built: 1920s

Queensland Heritage Register
- Official name: 7–9 Cedar Street, Yungaburra
- Type: state heritage (built)
- Designated: 15 March 1996
- Reference no.: 600480
- Significant period: 1920s (fabric)

7–9 Cedar Street, Yungaburra is a heritage-listed pair of shops at 7–9 Cedar Street, Yungaburra, Tablelands Region, Queensland, Australia. They were built in the 1920s. They were added to the Queensland Heritage Register on 15 March 1996.

== History ==
These two single-storeyed, timber buildings were erected c. 1920s as an office and cafe.

Yungaburra, previously known as Allumbah (meaning red cedar) Pocket, was surveyed in 1886 by Surveyor Rankin as part of a government village settlement scheme. In 1910, the Tablelands railway from Cairns to Millaa Millaa reached the town, which was renamed to avoid confusion with another similarly named town. In 1926, the Gillies Highway between Cairns and Gordonvale was opened. Fuelled by the resulting tourist trade to the nearby lakes, the town experienced a second period of development.

The site on which the buildings are erected was first subdivided in 1911, when it was acquired by Kathleen Bullman. In 1923 the property was acquired by Patrick McChoy and in 1929, by local company, Estate HS Williams Ltd. Photographs show the buildings were erected by 1929. One shop was an auctioneer's office and the other operated as a cafe servicing the Tivoli Theatre, located on the other side of Cedar Street.

== Description ==
The residence (No.7) and store (No.9) consist of two single-storeyed single skin timber buildings with exposed framing, corrugated iron gable roofs and some concrete stumps, which are built on a south sloping site, fronting Cedar Street to the north. The buildings are separated by an open space with a screen wall to the street.

Both buildings have similar square parapets with cantilevered timber and iron awnings supported by deep, curved timber brackets. These awnings are propped with round timber posts. Both buildings have display windows with recessed central entrances. The east and west elevations have window hoods with timber battens and corrugated iron, and the buildings contain both casement and sash windows.

The residence has two timber doors, either side of an internal dividing wall which has been partly removed. The store is longer than the residence, and has a rear timber lean-to and a later corrugated iron addition.

Internally, the residence has had a rearrangement of spaces, with walls removed and partitions added creating a bathroom, kitchen, bedroom and living space. The store has also had a rearrangement of spaces, with a streetfront display area, a bedroom and a storage area behind.

== Heritage listing ==
7–9 Cedar Street, Yungaburra was listed on the Queensland Heritage Register on 15 March 1996 having satisfied the following criteria.

The place is important in demonstrating the evolution or pattern of Queensland's history.

7–9 Cedar Street, Yungaburra, which comprises two c. 1920s timber buildings, is important in demonstrating the pattern of Queensland's history, in particular the development of Yungaburra and the Atherton Tableland.

The place is important in demonstrating the principal characteristics of a particular class of cultural places.

The place is important in demonstrating the principal characteristics of small 1920s country town commercial buildings.

The place is important because of its aesthetic significance.

It exhibits a range of aesthetic characteristics valued by the local community, in particular the contribution of the buildings, in their scale, form and use of materials, to the streetscape of Cedar Street and to the Yungaburra townscape, and as part of a cohesive group of early 20th century timber buildings.
