= Mount Quincan =

Mountain in Queensland, Australia

Highest point
- Coordinates: 17°18′11″S 145°34′39″E

Geography
- Location: Queensland, Australia

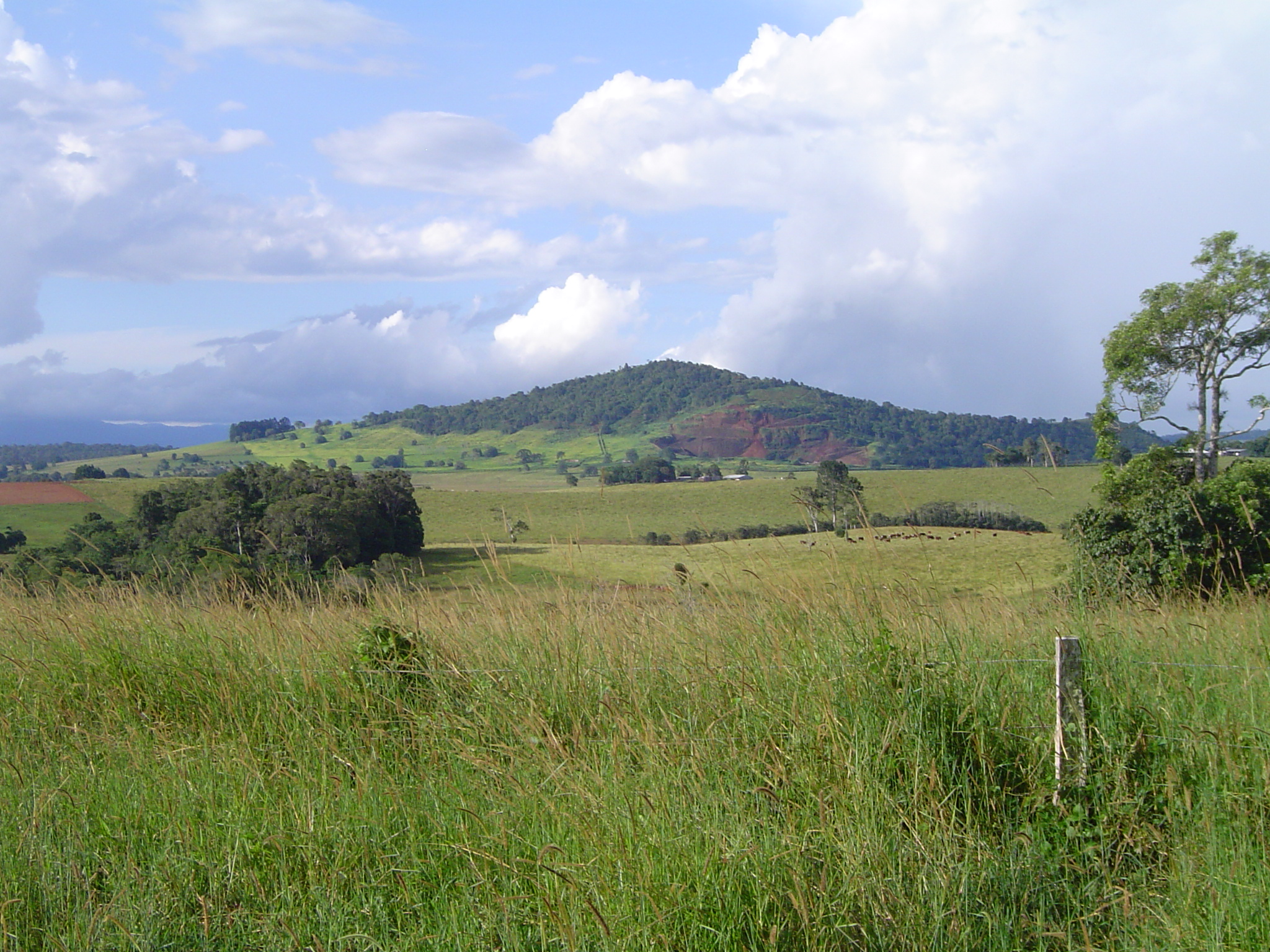
Mt Quincan, viewed from the south.

Mount Quincan is a volcanic mountain near Yungaburra on the Atherton Tableland in Far North Queensland, Australia.

The extinct volcano is one of many cinder cones in the Atherton Tableland region. Its crater is approximately 500 m across, with the main cone being to the northwest. Several of the nearby Seven Sisters cinder cones also have their craters to the southeast, which is possibly due to the ash and scoria being blown to the northwest by the prevailing SE winds. Swamp deposits within the crater were dated at 7250 years old, making that the minimum age for Mt Quincan. The scoria deposits also contain abundant mantle xenoliths of peridotite.

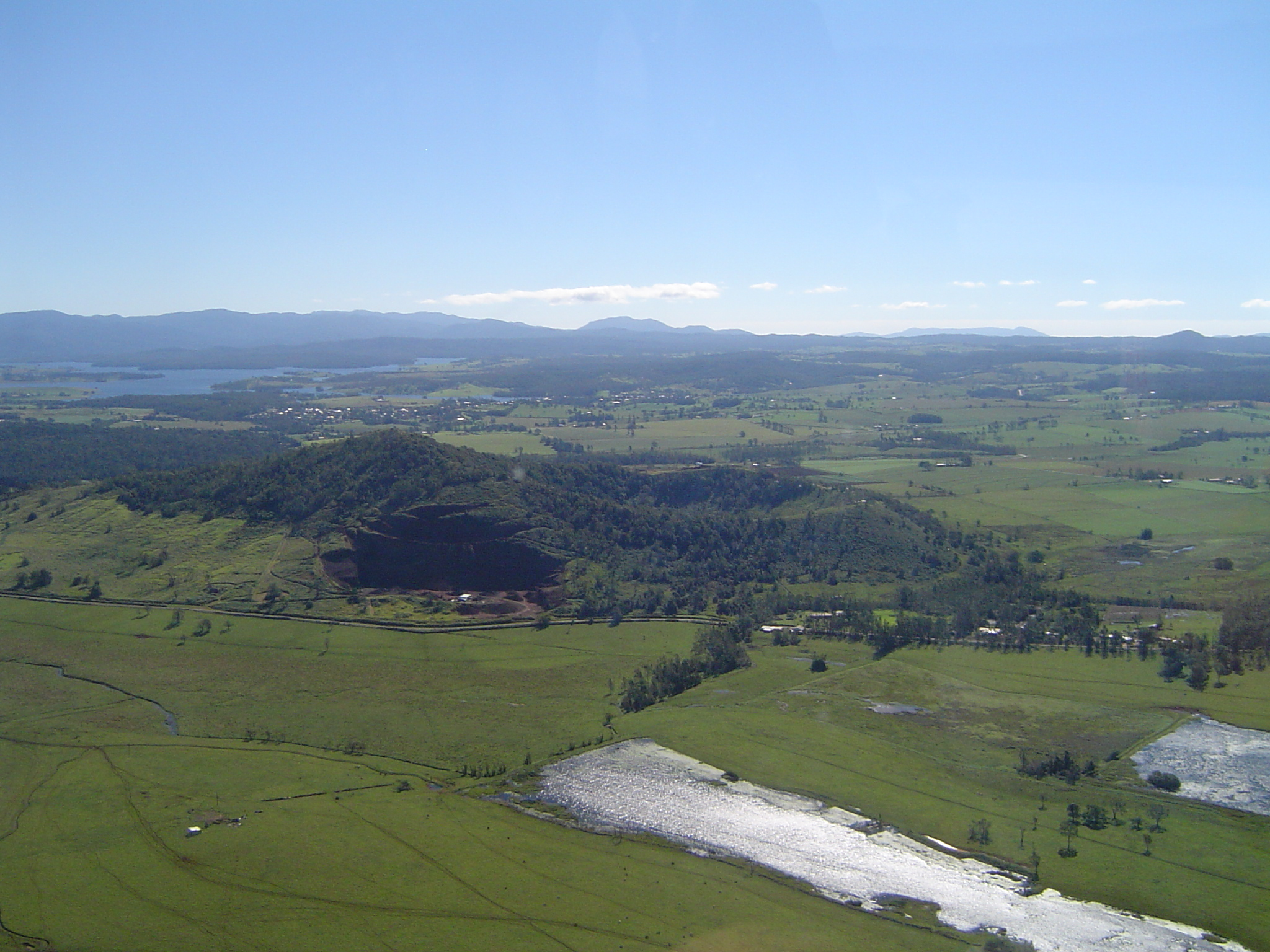
Mt Quincan, viewed from the southeast, showing the southern quarry with the main scoria cone behind it and the low-lying crater to the east.

Quincan, a type of Scoria, is mined from the south west quadrant of the mountain. Quincan is used in road construction, driveways, weed control and domestic gardening.
