= Yungaburra Post Office =

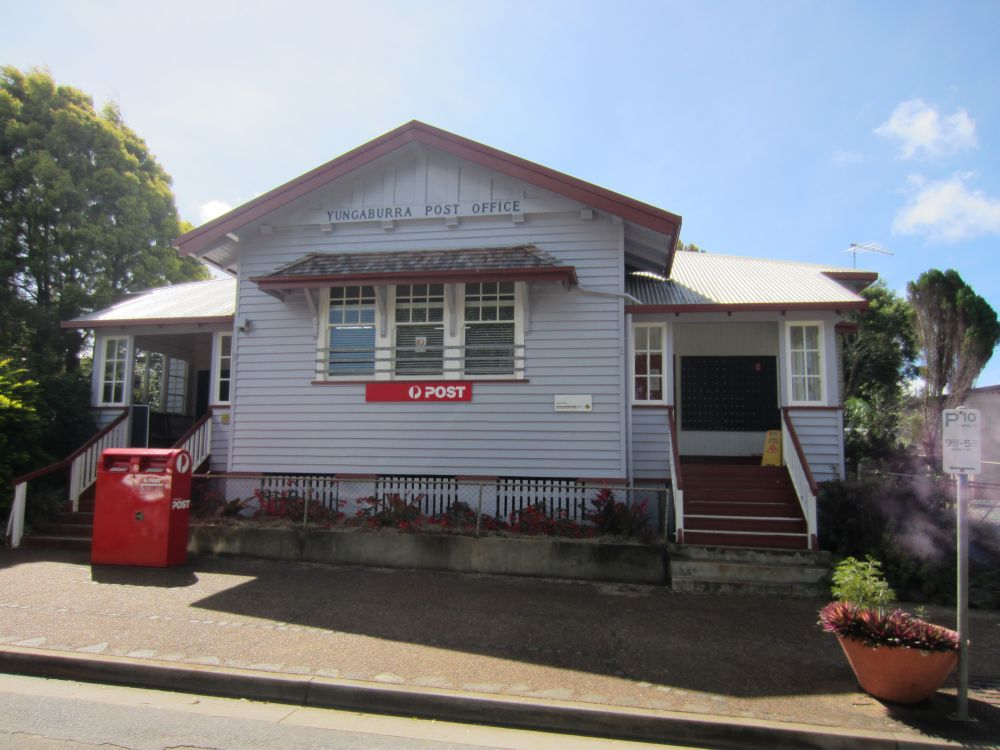
- Yungaburra Post Office, 2015

- Location within Queensland Location within Australia
- 17.27°S 145.582°E
- Location: 15–17 Cedar Street, Yungaburra, Tablelands Region, Queensland, Australia

History
- Design period: 1919–1930s (interwar period)
- Built: 1926

Queensland Heritage Register
- Official name: Yungaburra Post Office and residence
- Type: state heritage (built)
- Designated: 21 October 1992
- Reference no.: 600471
- Significant period: 1920s (fabric); 1920s–ongoing (historical, social)
- Significant components: residential accommodation – post master's house/quarters, garden/grounds, post & telegraph office

Yungaburra Post Office is a heritage-listed post office at 15–17 Cedar Street, Yungaburra, Tablelands Region, Queensland, Australia. It was built in 1926. It was added to the Queensland Heritage Register on 21 October 1992.

== History ==
The post office is a timber building constructed in 1926 to a standard design. The adjoining block has a timber postal residence set back from the road. The earliest post office service at Yungaburra had been from the railway station.

The first Europeans on the Atherton Tablelands were engaged in timbergetting and mining, but the rich soil and cool climate were thought particularly suitable for the development of agriculture. In 1885 a Village Settlement scheme was introduced which offered settlers 40-acre farm blocks with home sites clustered as a village. Around this time the Tablelands railway from the port of Cairns to the Tableland was begun, although it took far longer to reach its objective than originally envisaged. In 1888 a village settlement was laid out at Allumbah Pocket, later to become Yungaburra. The first farms at Allumbah were taken up in 1891, though the scheme proved unsuccessful. The railway reached Mareeba in 1895 and Atherton in 1903, greatly improving access to the area. Following new Land Acts in the early 1900s to encourage closer settlement that had more practical requirements, more people took up land around Allumbah.

The land on which the post office was later built was part of an Agricultural Farm selected by George O'Donnell in 1899. In 1900 the land was sold to George Wedderburn and subdivided into numerous small blocks in 1910. Six acres were acquired by the Railway Commissioner and the position of the new Yungaburra railway station, which opened in 1910, caused a geographic shift in focus from the original settlement, which was located further north west. Buildings were constructed or relocated near the railway and Allumbah was renamed Yungaburra to avoid confusion with another similarly named town. A period of rapid development began with the construction of a sawmill, a hotel and a number of shops and houses near the railway station. In 1911, Eacham Shire was formed.

Robina Heale purchased lots 19 and 20 in 1912. She does not appear to have lived in Yungaburra and it is not known if she constructed any buildings on the land.

The first postal services were conducted from the railway station, a common arrangement where mail travelled by rail and there was no post office. From 1924, a postmaster, L. Craven, is listed in the Post Office Directory for Yungaburra and served in this capacity for several years. The Gillies Highway between Yungaburra and Gordonvale was opened on 26 June 1926, providing the first trafficable road to the Tablelands. The road link made Yungaburra a gateway to the natural attractions of the Tablelands and created a second period of development in the town due to the blossoming tourist trade to the nearby lakes. Probably in response to this increased demand, the Australian Government purchased both blocks of land in August 1926 and constructed a post office building on lot 19. It is not known whether or not the building used as a post office residence was already there or was built concurrently.

The Interwar period was an active period for the construction of post offices, and 26 buildings of this standard porch and gable design were constructed in Queensland country towns between 1923 and 1939. This type of post office building contained no accommodation for postal officers, quarters being in a separate building, although a domestic scale was maintained. Materials introduced in this style included concrete stumps and shingles on sunhoods, both of which can be seen at Yungaburra. The post office had several staff members and a telephone exchange. Many tourists visiting Yungaburra and staying at the nearby hotel would have used the post office. During World War II many troops were stationed on the Tablelands and visited Yungaburra for recreational purposes. A Mr T L Bytie was postmaster throughout the war years.

In 1974, with changes in Post Office operations, the property passed into private hands, although it remains in use as a post office and has belonged to the current owner since 1979.

== Description ==
The post office and residence are timber buildings constructed on adjoining blocks. The front of the post office is aligned with Cedar Street and has a separate post box on the pavement. The residence is set well towards the rear of the next block. Both have an informal garden setting, which contributes to the aesthetic qualities of the street.

The post office is a single storeyed timber building set on concrete stumps. It has a hipped roof clad in corrugated iron with a central projecting gable with the sign Yungaburra Post Office. The main roof extends on either side of the gable to cover twin porches that are accessed by stairs with timber handrails. That on the left contains the postal boxes and the main entrance. That on the right is currently sealed. There is a bank of triple sash windows in the central gable and a shingled hood shades these windows. Pairs of sash windows covered by hoods are on either side of the building. At the rear a modern awning shades the loading area.

Inside the building, the walls are lined with timber and the ceiling with fibrous cement panels. A timber counter separates the public area from the office and sorting area. The public area at the front of the building has a writing bench under the windows.

The residence is set well back on its block and is aligned towards the post office building, being linked to it at the rear of the post office by an area of lawn and garden beds. It is also a timber building set on stumps with a hipped roof clad in corrugated iron. There is a central projecting gable facing towards the post office. The building has sections of verandah at the front and side, much of which has been built in. It has a number of alterations and extensions to the exterior.

== Heritage listing ==
Yungaburra Post Office and residence was listed on the Queensland Heritage Register on 21 October 1992 having satisfied the following criteria.

The place is important in demonstrating the evolution or pattern of Queensland's history.

Yungaburra Post Office is important in illustrating the pattern of Queensland history, being a government facility erected at the time of the linking of this area to the coast by the Gillies Highway. It provided services that played an important part in assisting the town to develop, to operate as a gateway to the surrounding area and to facilitate the growth of the early tourist industry on the Atherton Tablelands.

The place is important in demonstrating the principal characteristics of a particular class of cultural places.

The Post Office is a good example of a timber twin porch and gable post office of the 1920s, a standard design developed by the Government Architect's Office during a period when a high quality of design and finish was achieved.

The place is important because of its aesthetic significance.

It makes a substantial visual contribution to the built character of Yungaburra.

The place has a strong or special association with a particular community or cultural group for social, cultural or spiritual reasons.

The Post Office has had a long connection with the people of Yungaburra and the surrounding district as a provider of communication services that have been conducted from this building since 1926.
