= Residence, 12 Cedar Street, Yungaburra =

Residence, 12 Cedar Street
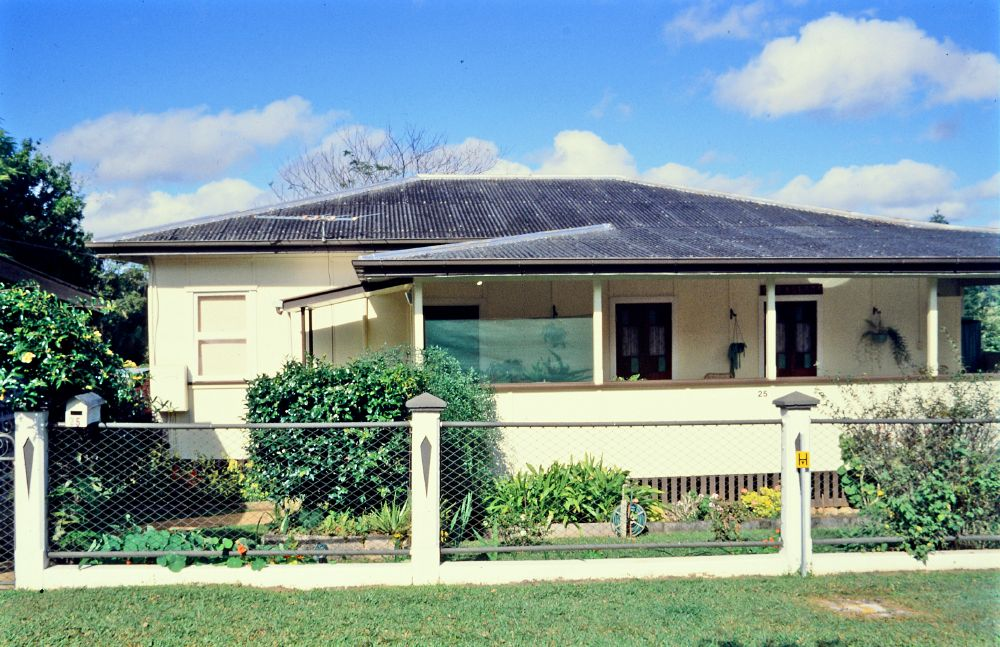
- Residence, 12 Cedar Street, 1998

- Location within Queensland Location within Australia
- 17.2702°S 145.5809°E
- Location: 12 Cedar Street, Yungaburra, Tablelands Region, Queensland, Australia

History
- Design period: 1939–1945 (World War II)
- Built: 1940s

Queensland Heritage Register
- Official name: Residence
- Type: state heritage (built)
- Designated: 21 August 1992
- Reference no.: 600476
- Significant components: residential accommodation – main house

Residence is a heritage-listed detached house at 12 Cedar Street, Yungaburra, Tablelands Region, Queensland, Australia. It was built in the 1940s. It was added to the Queensland Heritage Register on 21 August 1992.
