= Allumbah =

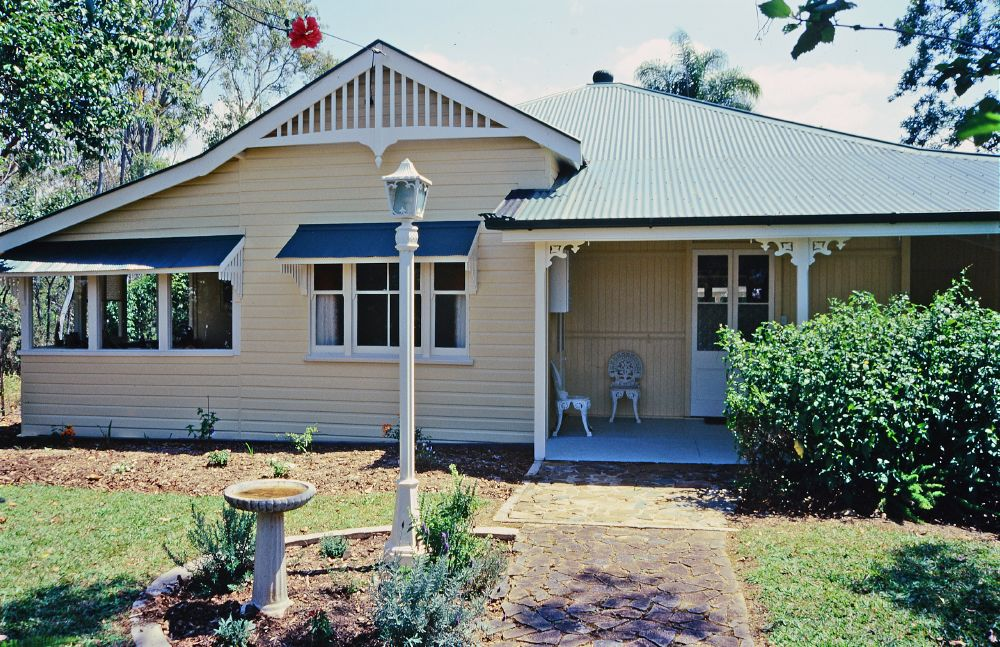
- Allumbah, 2001

- Location within Queensland Location within Australia
- 17.2673°S 145.5803°E
- Location: 7 Mulgrave Road, Yungaburra, Tablelands Region, Queensland, Australia

History
- Design period: 1919–1930s (interwar period)
- Built: c. 1926

Queensland Heritage Register
- Official name: Allumbah, Artist's Gallery
- Type: state heritage (built)
- Designated: 21 October 1992
- Reference no.: 600486
- Significant period: 1920s (fabric, historical)
- Significant components: residential accommodation – main house

Allumbah is a heritage-listed detached house at 7 Mulgrave Road, Yungaburra, Tablelands Region, Queensland, Australia. It was built c. 1926. It is also known as Artist's Gallery. It was added to the Queensland Heritage Register on 21 October 1992.

== History ==
Allumbah is a single storey timber dwelling thought to have been built in 1926 on land that formed part of the earliest settled area of Yungaburra.

Yungaburra was surveyed in 1888 as a Village Settlement called Allumbah. The Village Settlement scheme was introduced in 1885 and offered settlers farm blocks with home sites clustered as a village. Around this time, the Tablelands railway from the port of Cairns to the Tableland was begun, although it took far longer to reach its objective than originally envisaged. The first farms at Allumbah were taken up in 1891, though the scheme proved unsuccessful. The railway reached Mareeba in 1895 and Atherton in 1903, greatly improving access to the area. Following new Land Acts in the early 1900s more people took up land around Allumbah and a small service town developed to serve them. The land on which the house is built was part of a 7-acre block granted in 1916 to Albert Soffe and Frederick Campbell Williams as trustees for the estate of their father, Henry Sydney Williams. This grant replaced the original selection of 6 acres (2.4 ha) made in 1902 by H S Williams in an area in which the earliest commercial buildings were constructed.

Henry Williams had arrived in Australia in the 1860s and worked in a number of occupations before taking up land at Scrubby Creek on the Tablelands. After losing his dairy cattle to tick in 1895, Williams turned to business and ran a store and butchery at Scrubby Creek and the Carriers Arms hotel at Carrington, He then acquired land at Allumbah and established a store. He was killed in an accident in 1905, but his sons, under the name of "Estate H.S. Williams", continued the family business. In 1907 they established a shanty hotel in Allumbah to serve packers and the navvies constructing the railway inching its way towards the town. In 1910, the railway line reached the settlement, which had been renamed Yungaburra to avoid confusion with another similarly named town. The railway link triggered a period of rapid development with the construction of a sawmill, a store and a large hotel for the Williams family opposite the railway station and a number of shops and houses. In 1911, Eacham Shire was formed.

In 1926, the Gillies Highway between Yungaburra and Gordonvale was opened, providing the first trafficable road to the Tablelands. Yungaburra became a gateway to the natural attractions of the area and a blossoming tourist trade to the nearby lakes created a second period of development. The Williams hotel was enlarged and the estate developed other businesses in Yungaburra. In 1926, the land on which the house stands was excised from the larger holding and transferred from the Estate to Frances Amelia Wardle, a widowed daughter of H S Williams. The house is thought to have been built at this time. In 1947, Mrs Wardle died and the house was left to Marion Lehfeldt, her elder daughter, and then in 1954 was transferred to a group of Williams family members.

By 1967 the house had fallen into disrepair and was condemned. However, it has survived in use following repair and renovation by a series of owners during the late 20th century. In 1975 it was sold by the Williams family and changed hands twice before being purchased in 1981 by Christian and Jacqueline Souilijaert who ran it as an art gallery. The house is still known to many people locally as "the art gallery" even though it has not been used for this purpose since 1988 and has reverted to residential use. The house has undergone a series of modifications over the years and was renovated in 1998 at which the time the bathroom and kitchen were renewed and the verandah at the rear extended into a deck.

== Description ==
Allumbah is a timber building with a hipped and gabled roof clad in corrugated iron. It is set on stumps that are low at the front, but increase in height as the land falls away to the rear.

A low retaining wall constructed of volcanic rock runs along the front of the property, breaking for the driveway and then recommencing further north down Mulgrave Road for a distance of approximately 40 metres (130 ft). The stonework is similar to that seen elsewhere in Yungaburra, such as that in the gardens of the Lake Eacham Hotel. The trees that marked the front fence line have been removed.

At the centre of the front elevation there is a projecting bay with a triple window and sunhood below a decorative timber gable infill. This is adjoined on the right hand side by a wide verandah that runs around the side of the house and has been built in at the rear. The verandah roof is ceiled with tongue and groove timber boards and is supported by timber posts with decorative timber brackets. It has a timber handrail and slat balustrading. Four sets of French windows open onto the verandah.

The opposite side of the house has rooms along what may have been a former verandah. A verandah at the rear has been extended into a timber deck. The interior of the building has walls of tongue and groove timber boards and timber floors. The core rooms have high ceilings and the doors that open from the main room into the bedrooms and study have decorative transoms. The ceilings of all rooms on the perimeter of the house have raked ceilings, which suggests that the house has evolved from a four-room core and verandahs. The kitchen and bathroom are modern.

== Heritage listing ==
Allumbah was listed on the Queensland Heritage Register on 21 October 1992 having satisfied the following criteria.

The place is important in demonstrating the evolution or pattern of Queensland's history.

Allumbah was built during an important period in the development of Yungaburra and is located on part of the original Williams family land, indicating the position of the original settlement of Allumbah, which predated the current centre of the township.

The place is important because of its aesthetic significance.

Allumbah is a timber residence built in a traditional style and contributes to the built character of Yungaburra.

The place has a special association with the life or work of a particular person, group or organisation of importance in Queensland's history.

As a building constructed on part of the original Williams land and which remained in that family for many years, Allumbah has an association with the Williams family who made a major contribution to the commercial development of Yungaburra.
