= Williams' House, Yungaburra =

Williams' House
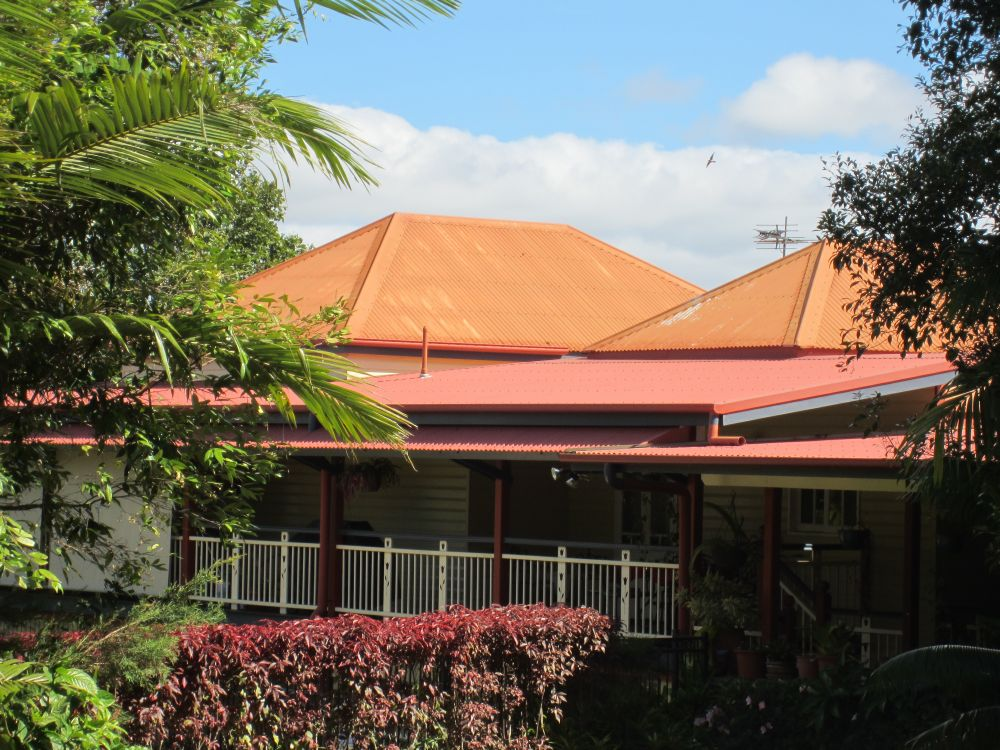
- Williams' House, 2015

- Location within Queensland Location within Australia
- 17.2704°S 145.5814°E
- Location: 16–20 Cedar Street, Yungaburra, Tablelands Region, Queensland, Australia

History
- Design period: 1900–1914 (early 20th century)
- Built: c. 1915–1940s

Queensland Heritage Register
- Official name: Residence 16-20 Cedar Street, Williams' House
- Type: state heritage (built)
- Designated: 21 October 1992
- Reference no.: 600472
- Significant period: 1910s–1940s (fabric, historical)
- Significant components: residential accommodation – main house, kitchen/kitchen house

Williams' House is a heritage-listed detached house at 16–20 Cedar Street, Yungaburra, Tablelands Region, Queensland, Australia. It was built from c. 1915 to the 1940s. It was added to the Queensland Heritage Register on 21 October 1992.

== History ==
The Williams's House is a timber dwelling, the earliest section of which may have been constructed by James Dunstan between 1911 and 1914 or may have been built by the Williams family business, which acquired the property in 1915. It has been extended since in several stages and was divided into two flats.

Yungaburra was surveyed in 1888 as a Village Settlement called Allumbah. The Village Settlement scheme was introduced in 1885 and offered settlers farm blocks with home sites clustered as a village. Around this time the Tablelands railway from the port of Cairns to the Atherton Tableland was begun, although it took far longer to reach its objective than originally envisaged. The first farms at Allumbah were taken up in 1891, though the scheme proved unsuccessful. The railway reached Mareeba in 1895 and Atherton in 1903, greatly improving access to the area. Following new Land Acts in the early 1900s more people took up land around Allumbah and a small commercial area developed to serve them.

In 1910, the railway line linking Cairns with the Tablelands reached Allumbah, which was then renamed Yungaburra to avoid confusion with another town. The Post Office Directory for this year lists almost all occupants of Yungaburra as "selectors." A period of rapid development then began with the construction of a sawmill, a hotel and a number of shops and houses near the new Yungaburra railway station. The land on which the house is built was part of a 65-acre block comprising adjoining Agricultural Farms 163 and 164 selected by George O'Donnell in 1899. In 1900 the land was purchased by George Wedderburn and subdivided into numerous small blocks following the opening of the railway. The Railway Commissioner acquired six acres and the position of the new railway station caused a geographic shift in focus from the original settlement, which was located towards the north west of the new commercial centre. Buildings were constructed or relocated near the railway.

In 1911, James Dunstan, probably of the partnership of Dunstan and Pillinger, Commission Agents, purchased 3 of the new subdivisions from George Wedderburn. He had purchased another block from this subdivision the previous year and took out a mortgage for £150 on the newly acquired land, though not necessarily to build a residence.

In 1915 Albert and Frederick Williams purchased the property as Trustees for the estate of their father, Henry S. Williams. H.S. Williams had arrived in Australia in the 1860s and worked in a number of occupations before leasing land at Scrubby Creek on the Tablelands. After losing his dairy cattle to tick in 1895, Williams turned to business and ran a store and butchery at Scrubby Creek and a hotel at Carrington. He then acquired land in the original Allumbah settlement area in 1898 and established a store. He was killed in an accident in 1905, but the business was continued by his family under the name of "Estate H.S. Williams". In 1907 they established a shanty hotel in Allumbah to serve packers and the navvies constructing the railway inching its way towards the town. In 1910, they opened a hotel near the railway station. The Williams family's interest in this vicinity grew as they acquired further land over the next few years.

In the 1923 post office directory the Estate of H.S. Williams is first listed as operating a store, butchers and bakery in Yungaburra and they may have established these businesses in anticipation of the road link from Gordonvale, which had been under construction since 1920. Williams' Lake Eacham Hotel at the corner of Cedar Street was also extended and upgraded in the mid 1920s.

The house is believed to have been first occupied by Edward Stratten (Ned) Williams, who had four children who were born between 1916 and 1921. Rooms were added at the rear of the house as the family grew. E S Williams appears in the Yungaburra directory for the first time in 1924 and was a partner in "Cairns and Tableland Motor Services Limited", a touring car company formed to bring tourists from Cairns to visit the Tablelands. It became a local institution known as the "White Cars" and eventually had branch garages in several local towns. A garage was constructed in Yungaburra by Williams to maintain the cars and as a car dealership. This enterprise linked naturally with the family hotel, which became a well-known resort for tourists and for functions.

In 1926 the Gillies Highway was opened and the role of Yungaburra as a gateway to the natural attractions of the Tablelands created a second period of development in the town due to the blossoming tourist trade to the nearby lakes. E S Williams died in 1929 and his wife died the following year. His brother, Frederick, moved from Atherton and brought up his own 5 children and his 4 nephews and nieces in the house. Rooms were again added to the house to accommodate such a large family.

During the years of the Second World War, many troops moved into the Tablelands. The area was used for training and recuperation and from March 1942, there was a USAF base at Mareeba at which many Americans were stationed as ground and workshop crews. There were also military hospitals in the area and many military personnel visited the hotel for dances, dinner and musical entertainments held on Sunday evenings. Sydney and Clive Williams were officers and also held parties at their home. A deck was added to the eastern side of the house during this time to provide for dancing.

The extended Williams family worked together and had commercial interests in a number of interlinked fields. Because of the variety of enterprises owned by the family in Yungaburra and other local centres, they were major providers of employment in the area and made an important contribution to the development of Yungaburra.

The Williams family owned the house at 16–20 Cedar Street until 1976, when Earle and Helena Jones and Bruce and Patricia Jones purchased it. This may have been the period when the house was divided into 2 flats. The property changed hands several times in the 1980s and has recently passed into the hands of a member of the Williams family again.

The house has been extended in several stages and has had a number of alterations carried out to it over the years including the filling in of verandahs and removal of internal walls.

== Description ==
The former Williams house is a single storey timber building set on stumps and has a corrugated iron hip and gable roof. It is at street level at the front and is set on stumps that increase in height as the ground falls away to the rear.

At the front, a former central verandah has been built in with timber and casement windows. Sliding windows in timber frames having alternating square panes of pink and green obscure glass flank this section and extend down each side of the building.

At the rear, what may be an early detached kitchen now forms part of the house. On the western side of the building towards the rear a section of verandah has been removed, exposing a portion of wall with exterior studding. A verandah side awning cuts across a window at this point, evidence of the series of adjustments made to the house to accommodate changing use. On the eastern side there is a deck with an awning over.

The interior walls are vertical timber boards and there are timber floors and ceilings. Some sections of wall appear to have been added or removed and other alterations made to accommodate use as two flats. French doors open onto some areas.

There is a wall constructed of basalt boulders approximately 1 metre (3 ft 3 in) high running along the front of the property.

== Heritage listing ==
The Williams' House was listed on the Queensland Heritage Register on 21 October 1992 having satisfied the following criteria.

The place is important in demonstrating the evolution or pattern of Queensland's history.

The former Williams house was built during an important period in the development of Yungaburra. As an early house built on one of the subdivisions made following the opening of the railway, it assists in understanding the way in which Yungaburra developed.

The place is important because of its aesthetic significance.

As a timber residence built in a traditional style it contributes to the built character of Yungaburra.

The place has a special association with the life or work of a particular person, group or organisation of importance in Queensland's history.

The house has had a long association with the Williams family who made a major contribution to the commercial development of Yungaburra.
