= Yungaburra Court House =

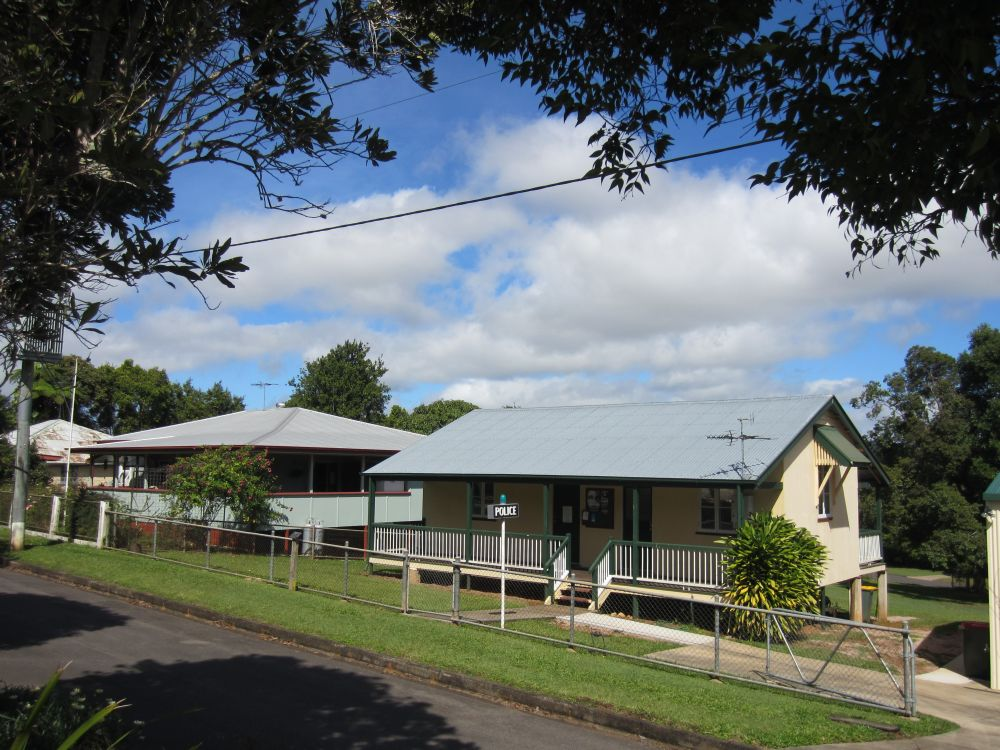
- Yungaburra Court House, 2015

- Location within Queensland Location within Australia
- 17.27°S 145.5806°E
- Location: 6–10 Cedar Street, Yungaburra, Tablelands Region, Queensland, Australia

History
- Design period: 1919–1930s (interwar period)
- Built: 1909–1921

Queensland Heritage Register
- Official name: Court House, Police Station and Residence, Court of Petty Sessions
- Type: state heritage (built)
- Designated: 21 October 1992
- Reference no.: 600477
- Significant period: 1920s (historical); 1900s–1920s (fabric)
- Significant components: office/s, police station, residential accommodation – police sergeant's house/quarters, court house

Yungaburra Court House is a heritage-listed courthouse at 6–10 Cedar Street, Yungaburra, Tablelands Region, Queensland, Australia. It was built from 1909 to 1921. It is also known as Court of Petty Sessions. It was added to the Queensland Heritage Register on 21 October 1992.

== History ==
The courthouse/police station was erected on this site in 1921 and was formerly a local school building. Formerly the site held a police lockup and stables which have now gone.

The first Europeans on the Atherton Tablelands were engaged in timbergetting and mining, but the rich soil and cool climate were thought particularly suitable for the development of agriculture. In 1885 a Village Settlement scheme was introduced which offered settlers 40-acre farm blocks with home sites clustered as a village. In 1888 a village settlement was laid out at Allumbah Pocket, later to become Yungaburra. At the same time the Tablelands railway from the port of Cairns to the Tableland was begun, although it took far longer to reach its objective than originally envisaged. The first farms at Allumbah were taken up in 1891, though the scheme proved unsuccessful. The railway reached Mareeba in 1895 and Atherton in 1903, greatly improving access to the area. Following new Land Acts in the early 1900s to encourage closer settlement that had more practical requirements, more people took up land around Allumbah.

The land on which the courthouse and police buildings were erected was part of an Agricultural Farm selected by George O'Donnell in 1899. In 1900 the land was sold to George Wedderburn and subdivided into numerous small blocks in 1910, the year in which the railway line linking Cairns with the Tablelands reached Allumbah, which was then renamed Yungaburra to avoid confusion with another similarly named town. A period of rapid development began with the construction of a sawmill, a hotel and a number of shops and houses near the new Yungaburra railway station. In 1911, Eacham Shire was formed.

In 1912, three blocks of land in Cedar Street were declared a police reserve and plans for police quarters and station, offices and cells were drawn up and estimated to cost £750. Although a police constable was appointed to serve Yungaburra in 1913, the building of a police station did not go ahead; instead a cottage was rented and a stable and feed room built for police use. On 29 January 1914, the Yungaburra District Progress Association wrote to the Home Secretary's Office asking that a Court of Petty Sessions be established in Yungaburra. At the time, the nearest court was in Atherton, which was inconvenient for settlers in and around Yungaburra. Both towns were within the Herberton Petty Sessions District. The request was denied on the grounds that few cases from the Yungaburra district were heard and all public offices were in Atherton, so that people from the surrounding area travelled there to conduct business in any case. A lockup was provided at Yungaburra in September 1914, however.

The Progress Association persisted, writing again on 2 September 1915 and received another rebuff. The reply pointed out that Yungaburra was only one of a number of settlements that had "a degree of temporary importance" as the railway branch line had advanced and that the police constable visited it only once a week. Although the Magistrate at Herberton was in favour of setting up a courtroom and office in Yungaburra, the court in Atherton agreed with the Home Secretary's decision. Undaunted, the Progress Association continued its campaign, enlisting the help of William Gillies, Member of the Queensland Legislative Assembly for Eacham, who visited Yungaburra in 1918.

In 1919 the Eacham Shire Council wrote to the Department of Justice saying that although the police building was rented and too small to hold a court, the police reserve was large and that a building could be moved onto it. They suggested that the old Yungaburra school building, which had been unused for 3 years and was only a quarter or a mile away, might be suitable. This idea was initially rejected as it was planned to use the building as a teacher's residence. However, the determined Mr C.W. Roseblade, Secretary of the Progress Association, did not let the matter rest and in 1920 the Minister for Justice resolved to proclaim a Petty Sessions District of Atherton with court venues designated as the townships of Yungaburra, Peeramon and Malanda. They were to share an officer based on Atherton who would serve 2 days a week at each.

The cost of dismantling, moving and adapting the old school was estimated to be £185. This building was constructed around 1909 and in order to use it as a court it was enlarged and doors, windows and the steps to front and back were moved. The work was completed in May 1921 and a small office was constructed on the verandah as something of an afterthought in September. The completed cost was £264/10/5 and provided a court room, an office to be shared by the Clerk of Petty Sessions and the Dairy Inspector in the extension and the verandah office for the constable.

In 1926, the Gillies Highway between Yungaburra and Gordonvale was opened, providing the first trafficable road to the Tablelands. Yungaburra became a gateway to the natural attractions of the area and a blossoming tourist trade to the nearby lakes created a second period of development. The court building has changed little since, although there are modern fittings in the police office and the constable's office on the verandah no longer exists. A two-car garage has been constructed between the police station and residence. The 1914 lockup to the rear of the reserve was demolished recently.

== Description ==
The police reserve at Yungaburra consists of 3 adjoining blocks of land on Cedar Street. These contain the court house/police station, a modern two bay garage and a police residence.

The courthouse/police station is a single storey timber building, rectangular in form, with its long axis towards the street. It is set on metal stumps that are low at the front and increase in height towards the back as the ground falls away to the rear of the block. It has verandahs running along both the back and front of the building. The gabled roof is clad with corrugated iron and extends over the verandahs where it is supported on timber posts. The verandahs have simple timber handrails. There are doors to the office and courtroom at the front flanked by casement windows in timber frames. There are casement windows to the rear verandah and at the ends of the building where they are shaded by sun hoods. All windows are fitted with modern steel security grilles.

The interior of the building is divided into two rooms by a wall of vertical tongue and groove boards and has coved timber ceilings. The larger room of the two is the courtroom and has a triple casement window over a timber magistrate's bench. The second room is used as a police office and has modern cupboards and a counter. There is a toilet on the rear verandah.

Between the courtroom/police station and the police residence is a modern timber double garage with metal roller doors.

The police residence is a timber dwelling set on cement stumps, which are low at the front and increase in height towards the back as the ground falls away to the rear of the block. The staircase at the rear of the building has been encased with weatherboards. It has a hipped roof clad in corrugated fibrous cement sheeting. The residence appears to have had verandahs along the front and side built in. There are two access doors at the front. It has pressed metal sunhoods to some windows, which are generally casements in timber frames.

A metal cyclone fence runs along the front of the whole police reserve.

== Heritage listing ==
Yungaburra's Court House, Police Station and Residence was listed on the Queensland Heritage Register on 21 October 1992 having satisfied the following criteria.

The place is important in demonstrating the evolution or pattern of Queensland's history.

The police station and former courthouse and the police residence illustrate the growth of Yungaburra and the surrounding district in the early 20th century. The original provision of office space in the courthouse for the Dairy Inspector in the 1920s indicates the importance of the dairy industry to the prosperity of this area.

The place is important because of its aesthetic significance.

The court house/police station and residence are timber buildings constructed in traditional styles and make a substantial contribution to the built character of Yungaburra, being part of a cohesive group of such buildings in Cedar Street.

The place has a strong or special association with a particular community or cultural group for social, cultural or spiritual reasons.

The former courthouse and police station has been connected with the people of Yungaburra and the surrounding area since the early 20th century as a focus for the provision of important government services. These range from the first use of the courthouse as a school, through use as a court of petty sessions and offices for the dairy inspector and police officer, to modern use as a police station.
