= Yungaburra National Park =

National park in Australia

- IUCN category II (national park)
- Location within Queensland
- Location: Queensland
- Nearest city: Yungaburra
- Coordinates: 17°17′16″S 145°34′15″E
- Area: 0.055 km^{2} (0.021 sq mi)
- Established: 12 September 1953
- Governing body: Queensland Parks and Wildlife Service

The Yungaburra National Park is a national park on the Atherton Tableland in Far North Queensland, Australia.
