= Yungaburra =

- Town
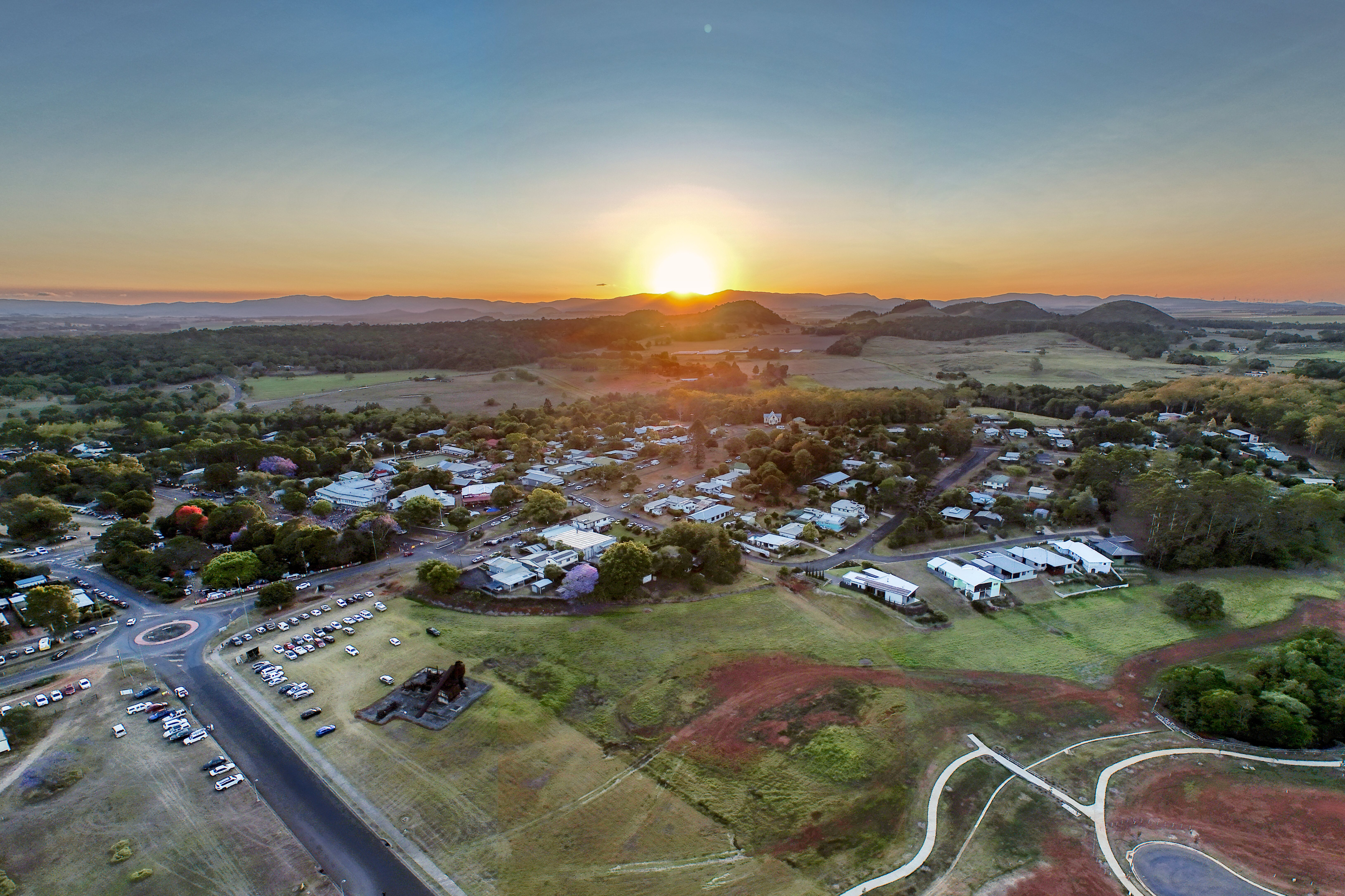

- Interactive map of Yungaburra
- Coordinates: 17.2688°S 145.5827°E
- Country: Australia
- State: Queensland
- LGA: Tablelands Region
- Location: 12.7 km (7.9 mi) N of Malanda; 30.0 km (18.6 mi) E of Atherton; 67.3 km (41.8 mi) SW of Cairns; 1,678 km (1,043 mi) NNW of Brisbane
- Established: 1886

Government
  - State electorate: Hill
  - Federal division: Kennedy

Area
  - Total: 17.0 km^{2} (6.6 sq mi)
- Elevation: 750 m (2,460 ft)

Population
  - Total: 1,272 (2021 census)
  - Density: 74.82/km^{2} (193.8/sq mi)
- Time zone: UTC+10:00 (AEST)
- Postcode: 4884
- Mean max temp: 27.7 °C (81.9 °F)
- Mean min temp: 10.4 °C (50.7 °F)
- Annual rainfall: 1,274 mm (50.2 in)
Localities around Yungaburra
East Barron	Lake Tinaroo	Barrine
East Barron	Yungaburra	Lake Barrine
East Barron	Peeramon	Lake Eacham

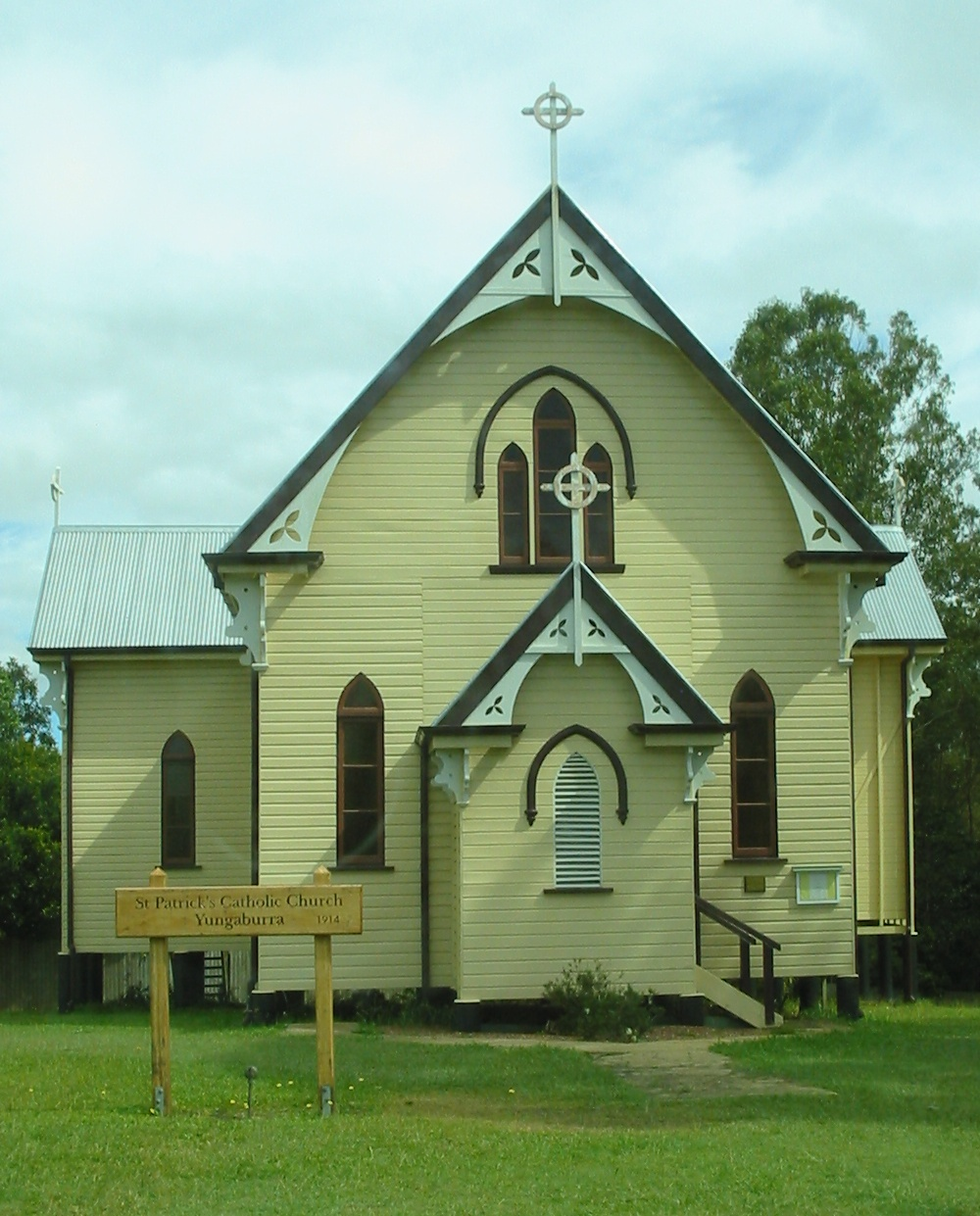
St Patrick's Catholic Church (built 1914)

Yungaburra is a rural town and locality in the Tablelands Region, Queensland, Australia. In the 2021 census, the locality of Yungaburra had a population of 1,272 people.

== Geography ==
Yungaburra is on the Atherton Tableland in Far North Queensland.

The landscape around Yungaburra has been shaped by millennia of volcanic activity. The most recent eruptions were approximately 10,000 years ago. Notable geological features nearby include:

- Seven Sisters and Mount Quincan are volcanic cones.
- Lake Eacham (Yidyam) and Lake Barrine are lakes inside volcanic craters.
- Mount Hypipamee Crater is a diatreme (crater).
- Tinaroo Dam submerged the old town of Kulara is visible, on whose cricket-pitch, when drought conditions drastically lower the water-level, locals play cricket matches.

== History ==
Prior to European settlement, the area around Yungaburra was inhabited by about sixteen different indigenous groups, among them the Ngatjan, with the custodians being Yidinji people and neighbouring Ngajanji people. The Queensland police and native troops carried out extensive massacres in the area to rid it of blacks. In one incident in 1884, at Skull Pocket just north of the town, a group of Yidinji were surrounded at night, and at dawn mowed down after they fled on hearing the first shot. The children were brained or stabbed to death by native troopers.

In the early 1880s, the area around Allumbah Pocket was used as an overnight stop for miners travelling west from the coast. In 1886 the land was surveyed, and in 1891 settlers moved in.

Allumbah State School opened on 7 June 1909. In 1911 it was renamed Yungaburra State School.

In 1910, the railway arrived and the railway station was named Yungaburra by the Queensland Railways Department. The town was then renamed Yungaburra, to avoid confusion with another town called Allumbah. The name Yungaburra comes from the local Yidiny word janggaburru, denoting the Queensland silver ash (Flindersia bourjotiana).

By 1911, indigenous numbers had fallen to 20% of the pre-settlement population due to disease, conflict with settlers and loss of habitat.

In January 1911, residents of Kulara (a small town to the north of Yungaburra) began lobbying for a school, claiming there were 42 children in the district. Kulara State School opened on 17 June 1912. It closed on 1 September 1958, when the Tinaroo Dam began to fill, inundating the town. However, being on higher ground, the school building was not flooded and became a private residence at 85 Backshall Road (now in Barrine, 17.24420°S 145.58306°E).

In 2006, the Atherton Tableland region was damaged by Cyclone Larry, rated as Category 4 cyclone on the Australian scale. Of the 19 heritage listed sites in Yungaburra, only the roofs of the community hall, police station and one of the bush cottages were badly damaged, as were the front of the Yungaburra Butchery and Gem Gallery sign. The town was restored very quickly; little evidence of the cyclone is visible.

== Demographics ==
In the 2006 census, the town of Yungaburra had a population of 932 people.

In the 2011 census, the locality of Yungaburra had a population of 1,116 people.

In the 2016 census, the locality of Yungaburra had a population of 1,239 people.

In the 2021 census, the locality of Yungaburra had a population of 1,272 people.

== Heritage listings ==
Yungaburra has a number of heritage-listed sites, including:

- 27 Atherton Road: Bank of New South Wales
- 6–10 Cedar Street: Yungaburra Court House
- 7–9 Cedar Street: 7–9 Cedar Street, Yungaburra
- 12 Cedar Street: Residence
- 15–17 Cedar Street: Yungaburra Post Office
- 16–20 Cedar Street: Williams' House
- 19 Cedar Street: Yungaburra Community Centre
- 32 Cedar: Billy Madrid's House
- 34 Cedar Street: Barber's Shop, Yungaburra
- Curtain Fig Tree Road, East Barron: Curtain Fig Tree
- 7 Eacham Road: St Marks Anglican Church
- 25–33 Eacham Road: Cairns Plywood Pty Ltd Sawmill Complex
- 20 Gillies Highway: Eden House Restaurant
- 2 Kehoe Place: Butchers Shop
- 6–8 Kehoe Place: Lake Eacham Hotel
- 7 Mulgrave Road: Allumbah
- 4 Oak Street: Residence
- 1 Penda Street: St Patricks Catholic Church
- on the shores of Lake Tinaroo, the Afghanistan Avenue of Honour
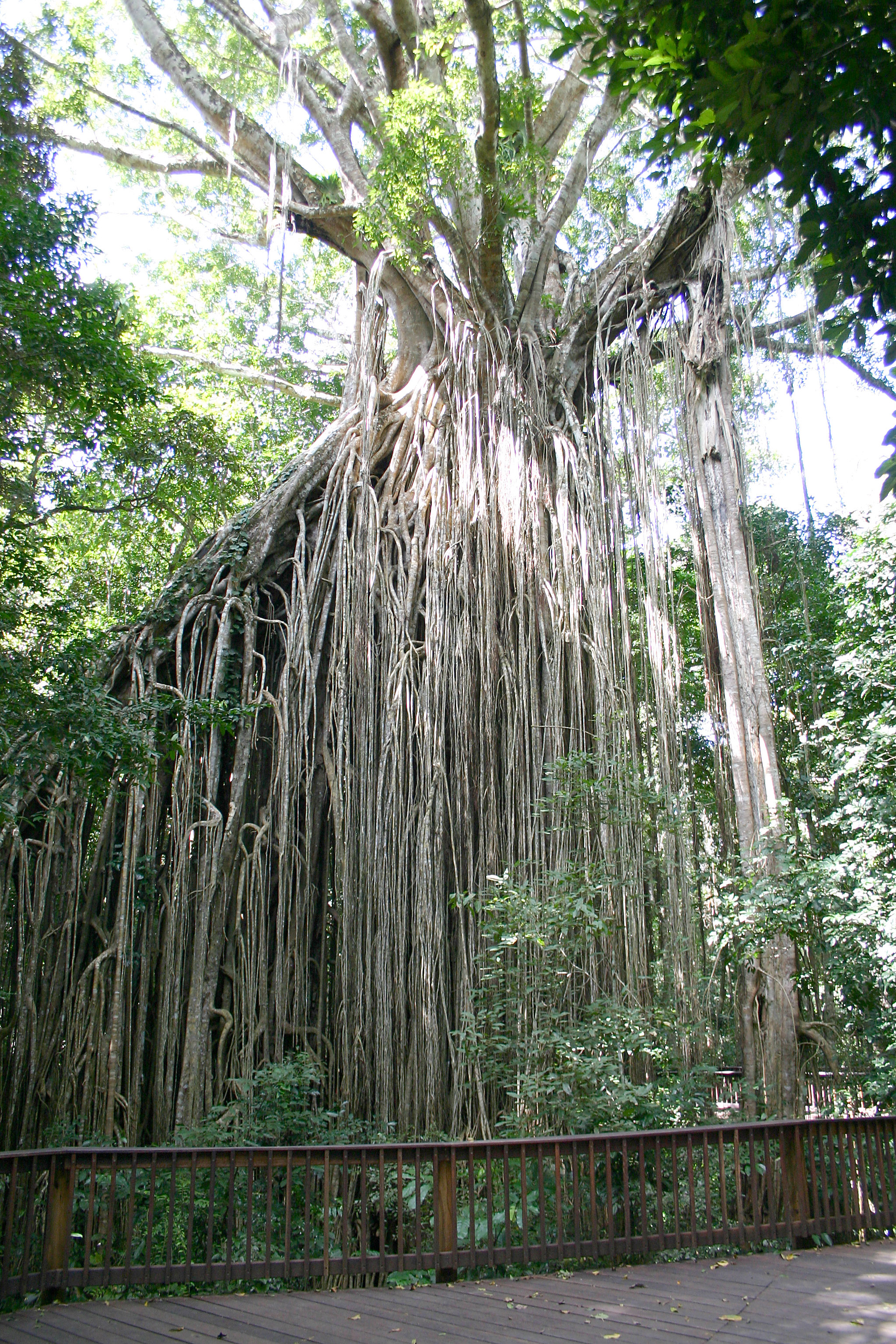
Curtain Fig Tree

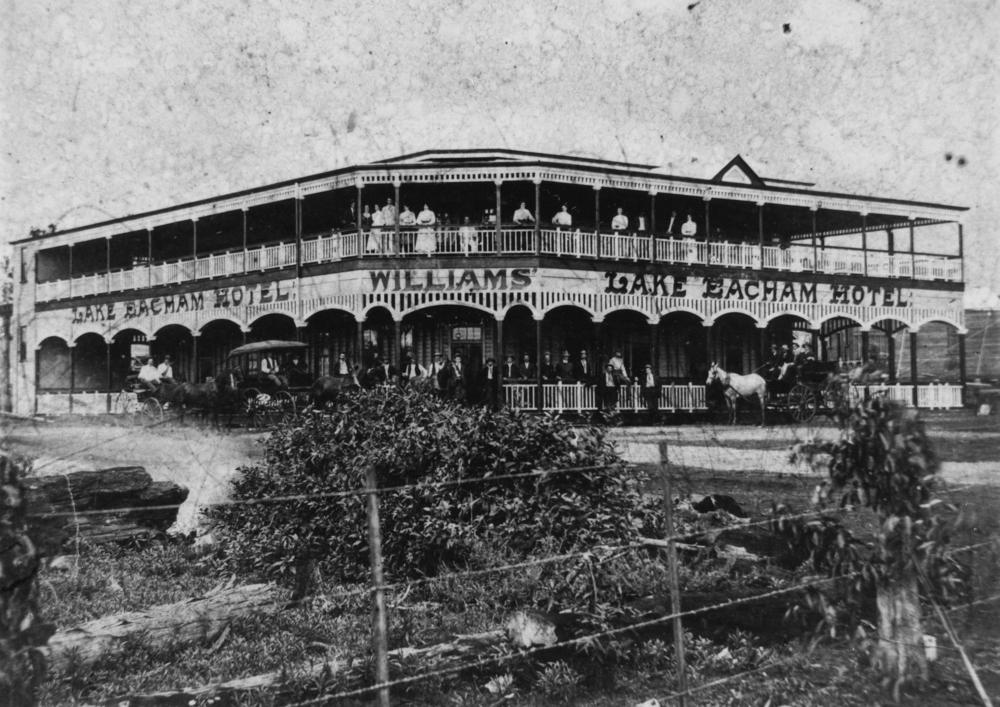
Lake Eacham Hotel

== Amenities ==
Yungaburra's economy today revolves around tourism, and the town contains a primary school, post office, library/telecentre and a range of businesses and services for the use of residents and visitors. Other facilities include a tennis court and a bowling club. The town has 18 Heritage Listed buildings, and is the largest National Trust village in Queensland. The Yungaburra Markets, held on the fourth Saturday of each month, are one of the largest in Far North Queensland, and each year around the end of October, Yungaburra holds the two-day Yungaburra Folk Festival, featuring concerts from Australian (and sometimes international) folk musicians.

Yungaburra is also the site of the war memorial to soldiers lost, opened 22 June 2013.

There is a network of walking tracks around the town including Peterson's Creek.

Yungaburra has a library at Maud Kehoe Park operated by the Tablelands Regional Council.

The Yungaburra branch of the Queensland Country Women's Association meets at the QCWA Hall on the corner of Cedar Street and the Gillies Highway.

Our Lady of Consolation and St Patrick's Catholic Church is at 3 Mulgrave Road. It is within the Atherton Parish of the Roman Catholic Diocese of Cairns.

== Education ==
Yungaburra State School is a government primary (Prep–6) school for boys and girls at 4 Maple Street (17.2729°S 145.5857°E). In 2017, the school had an enrolment of 213 students with 18 teachers (12 full-time equivalent) and 14 non-teaching staff (9 full-time equivalent). In 2018, the school had an enrolment of 224 students with 20 teachers (15 full-time equivalent) and 15 non-teaching staff (8 full-time equivalent).

There is no secondary school in Yungaburra. The nearest government secondary schools are Atherton State High School in Atherton to the west and Malanda State High School in Malanda to the south.

== Tourism ==
Allumbah Pocket is a picnic area on Peterson's Creek which runs past Yungaburra. It is the centre for a series of walking tracks along the creek. Tracks lead to Frawley's Pool, a popular swimming hole and picnic area, then further to Yungaburra's historical train bridge. In the opposite direction there is a track to the platypus viewing deck. Aside from this all of the tracks are relatively easy and short enough for anyone to do. The site is dedicated to Geoff Tracy, a local renowned environmentalist who died in 2004.

Yungaburra has access to the southern arm of Lake Tinaroo which is popular for fishing, canoeing, sailing, swimming, water-skiing and camping. The other main places to get to Tinaroo are Kairi and the township of Tinaroo.

The Curtain Fig Tree, which is just out of Yungaburra, is a giant rainforest fig tree with roots hanging down, giving it the appearance of curtains. There is a short boardwalk around the tree.

Lake Barrine and Lake Eacham are crater lakes, formed from volcanoes. Lake Eacham is popular for swimming and Lake Barrine has a teahouse and gift shop as well as cruises around the lake however is unsuitable for swimming due to the cruise boats. Both lakes have walking tracks around them. Lake Barrine's track is 6 kilometres (3.7 mi) and Lake Eacham's is 3 kilometres (1.9 mi).

== Notable people ==
Notable people from or who have lived in Yungaburra include:

- George Alfred Duffy (1887–1941), Member of the Queensland Legislative Assembly for Eacham
- Jim Petrich, businessman, grazing industry leadership, and Cape York economic development
- Edward Stratten Williams (1921–1999), judge of the Supreme Court of Queensland

== See also ==
- Curtain Fig National Park
- Yungaburra National Park
