= Residence, 4 Oak Street, Yungaburra =

House in Queensland

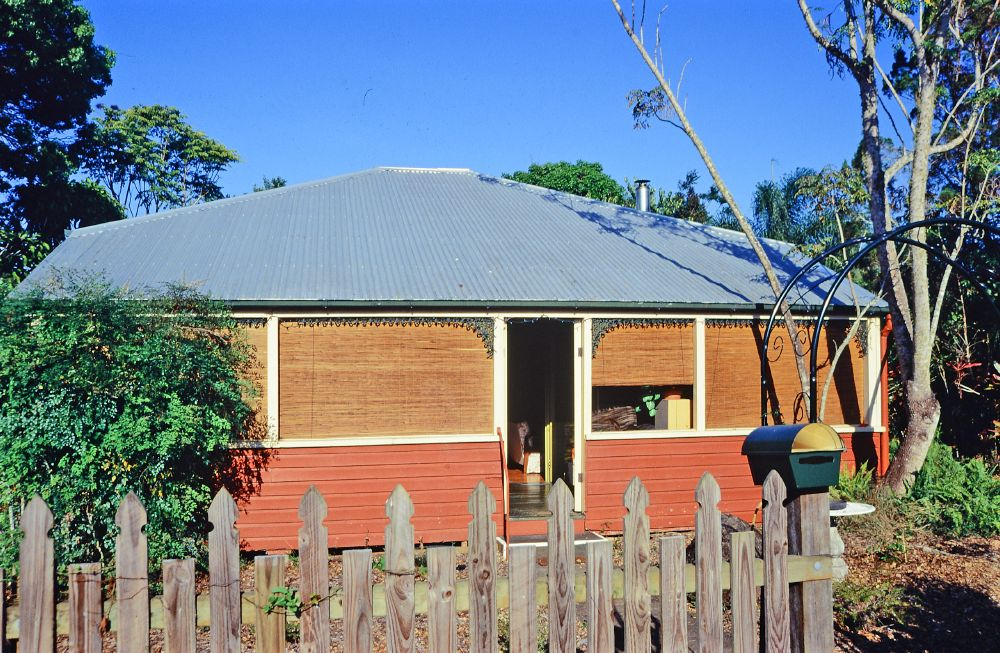
- Residence, 4 Oak Street, 2001

- Location within Queensland Location within Australia
- 17.2677°S 145.5815°E
- Location: 4 Oak Street, Yungaburra, Tablelands Region, Queensland, Australia

History
- Design period: 1919–1930s (interwar period)
- Built: c. 1910

Queensland Heritage Register
- Official name: Residence
- Type: state heritage (built)
- Designated: 21 August 1992
- Reference no.: 600487
- Significant components: shed – storage, residential accommodation – main house

Residence, 4 Oak Street, Yungaburra is a heritage-listed detached house at 4 Oak Street, Yungaburra, Tablelands Region, Queensland, Australia. It was built c. 1929. It was added to the Queensland Heritage Register on 21 August 1992.
