= Billy Madrid's House =

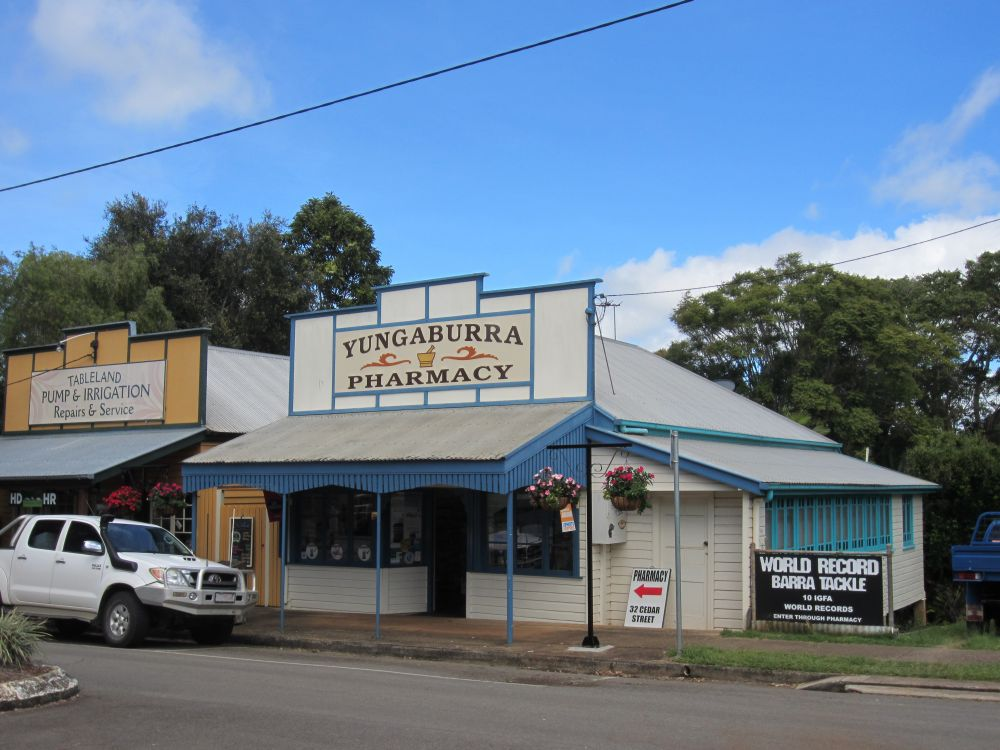
- Bill Madrid's House, 2015

- Location within Queensland Location within Australia
- 17.2709°S 145.5826°E
- Location: 32 Cedar Street, Yungaburra, Tablelands Region, Queensland, Australia

History
- Design period: 1919–1930s (interwar period)
- Built: c. 1925

Queensland Heritage Register
- Official name: Special Glass Co. Shop, Billy Madrid's house, T.A.B. Agency, Tailor's shop
- Type: state heritage (built)
- Designated: 21 October 1992
- Reference no.: 600478
- Significant period: 1920s (fabric) c. 1925–1955, 1990s–ongoing (historical use)
- Significant components: shed/s

Billy Madrid's House is a heritage-listed shop at 32 Cedar Street, Yungaburra, Tablelands Region, Queensland, Australia. It was built c. 1925. It is also known as Special Glass Company Shop, T.A.B. Agency, and Tailor's shop. It was added to the Queensland Heritage Register on 21 October 1992.

== History ==
The former Billy Madrid's House is one of a two adjacent timber shops which are believed to have been built about 1925, probably in anticipation of the increase in trade experienced in Yungaburra following the connection of the town with Cairns by the Gillies Highway in 1926.

The first Europeans on the Atherton Tablelands were engaged in timbergetting and mining, but the rich soil and cool climate were thought particularly suitable for the development of agriculture. In 1885 a Village Settlement scheme was introduced which offered settlers 40-acre farm blocks with home sites clustered as a village. In 1888 a village settlement was laid out at Allumbah Pocket, later to become Yungaburra. At the same time the Tablelands railway from the port of Cairns to the Tableland was begun, although it took far longer to reach its objective than originally envisaged. The first farms at Allumbah were taken up in 1891, though the scheme proved unsuccessful. The railway reached Mareeba in 1895 and Atherton in 1903, greatly improving access to the area. Following new Land Acts in the early 1900s to encourage closer settlement, which had more practical requirements, more people took up land around Allumbah. The land on which the shop was later built, and which was to become the commercial heart of Yungaburra, was part of an Agricultural Farm selected by George O'Donnell in 1899. In 1900 the land was sold to George Wedderburn and subdivided into numerous small blocks in 1910, Ned Lisha, a storekeeper, purchasing Lot 16. The Railway Commissioner acquired six acres and the position of the new Yungaburra railway station caused a geographic shift in focus from the original settlement, which was located towards the north west of the new commercial centre. Buildings were constructed or relocated near the railway. In 1912 Archibald Hendren bought lot 16 and took out a mortgage for £1750 on it, but then sold it to Albert Soffe Williams.

His father, Henry S. Williams, had arrived in Australia in the 1860s and worked in a number of occupations before taking up land at Scrubby Creek on the Tablelands. After losing his dairy cattle to tick in 1895, Williams turned to business and ran a store and butchery at Scrubby Creek and the Carriers Arms hotel at Carrington. He then acquired land in the original Allumbah settlement in 1898 and established a store. He was killed in an accident in 1905, but the family business was continued by his sons under the name of "Estate H.S. Williams". In 1907 they established a shanty hotel in Allumbah to serve packers and the navvies constructing the railway inching its way towards the town. In 1910, the railway line reached the settlement, which had been renamed Yungaburra to avoid confusion with another similarly named town. The railway link triggered a period of rapid development with the construction of a sawmill, a store and a large hotel for the Williams family opposite the railway station, and a number of shops and houses. In 1918, a new title to lot 16 was issued in the name of Estate H.S. Williams Limited.

In 1926, the Gillies Highway between Yungaburra and Gordonvale was opened, providing the first trafficable road to the Tablelands. Yungaburra became a gateway to the natural attractions of the area and a blossoming tourist trade to the nearby lakes created a second period of development. The shop is believed to have been constructed around 1925, probably in conjunction with the adjacent shop, also on lot 16 and was first occupied by a tailor.

In June 1954, the land was subdivided into 2 blocks so that each shop was on a separate title. In January 1955, William Madrid, a long-term employee of Williams' Lake Eacham Hotel, acquired lot 1 containing this building via a seller's mortgage to Maud Kehoe (born Williams) and her daughters in law, owners of the hotel. The Madrids occupied the shop as a residence with access through a door into an addition at the right hand side from which Mrs Madrid ran a hairdressing business. The shed at rear of the shop was constructed in 1967. Billy Madrid died in 1987 and in 1995 the shop was purchased by the current owners and underwent considerable repair including replacement of the roof. The current shopfront windows were installed to facilitate use as a shop. The Madrid family could not remember the building ever having had shopfront windows and as a tailor's premises, residence and later as a TAB agency, it may not have needed them.

In 2016, the property is occupied by a combined pharmacy and fishing tackle shop.

== Description ==
The former Billy Madrid's House is a single storey timber building, rectangular in form, with its short axis towards the street. The building is level with the street at the front and has concrete and timber stumps of increasing height towards the back as the ground falls away to the rear of the block. The shop has a stepped parapet and a gable and hipped roof clad in corrugated metal. Timber posts support a metal awning to the street. The shopfront has a central recessed entry flanked by display windows. There are large timber framed shop windows with multiple panes facing the street. The shop interior is simple and has timber walls and floors.

There is a skillion-roofed extension along the western side. This is constructed of timber and has a row of timber framed casement windows running for most of its length. A door to the street beside the shop window provides access to it. To the rear of the block is a large shed with a low-pitched gabled roof. It is clad in corrugated iron and set on a concrete slab. The concrete is marked "Bill Lena 28.10.67".

== Heritage listing ==
The former Billy Madrid's House was listed on the Queensland Heritage Register on 21 October 1992 having satisfied the following criteria.

The place is important in demonstrating the evolution or pattern of Queensland's history.

As an early commercial building in Yungaburra, the shop marks the emergence of the town as a gateway to the Tablelands following the arrival of the railway in 1910 and the commencement of a road link with the coast in 1926. This facilitated the growth of agriculture and dairying on the Tablelands and heralded the development of tourism in the area.

The place is important in demonstrating the principal characteristics of a particular class of cultural places.

The shop is an example of the type of simple timber commercial building that served many new settlements in the early 20th century.

The place is important because of its aesthetic significance.

In its form, scale and detail it makes a substantial contribution to the built character of Yungaburra.

The place has a special association with the life or work of a particular person, group or organisation of importance in Queensland's history.

As a building constructed as part of the Williams Estate, the shop has an association with the Williams family who made a major contribution to the commercial development of Yungaburra.
