= Tablelands Folk Festival =

Coordinates: 17°16′08″S 145°34′58″E

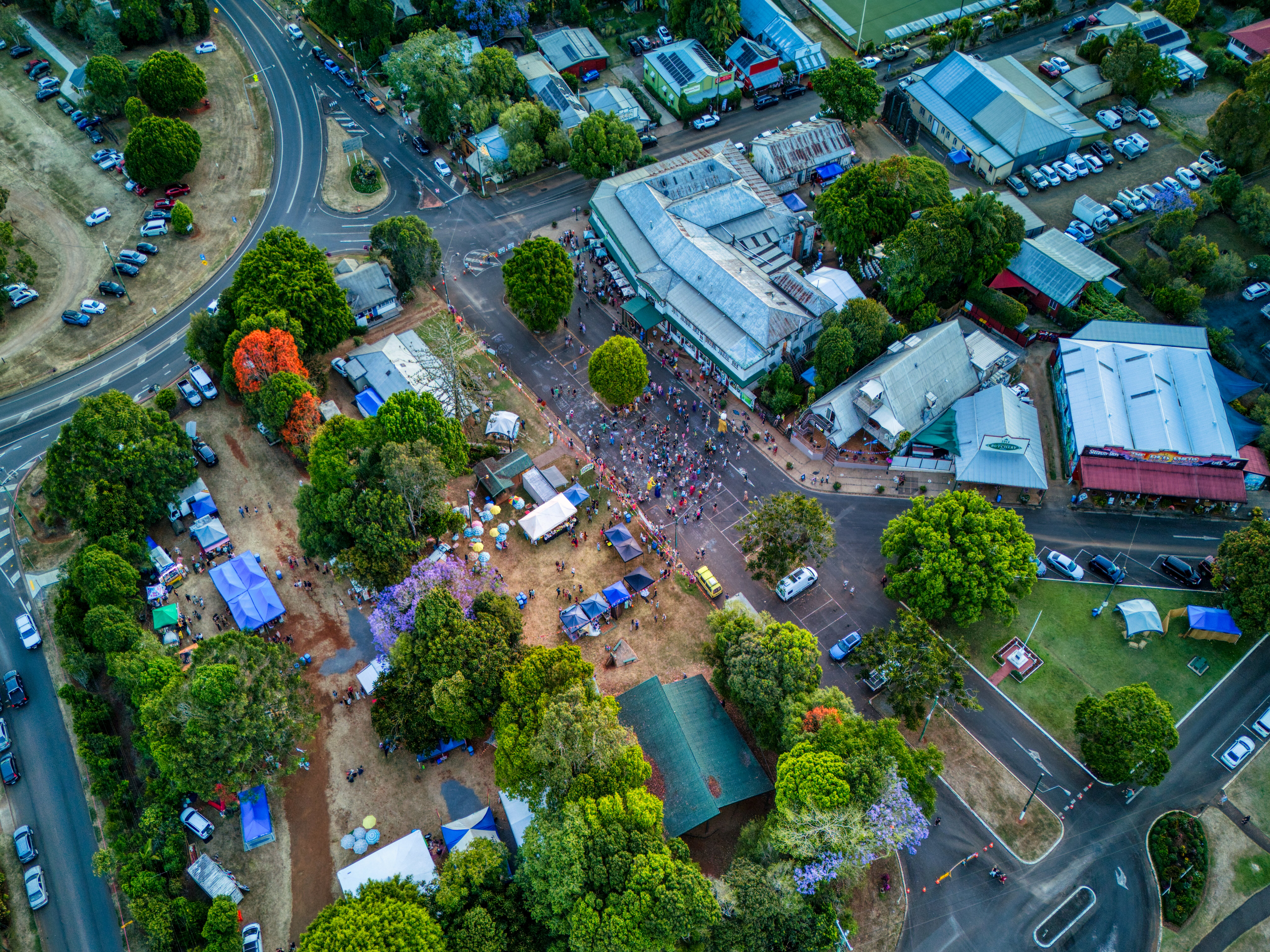
Tablelands Folk Festival, Yungaburra, 2024

The Tablelands Folk Festival, the sometime 'Yungaburra Folk Festival', is a music festival held in the village of Yungaburra, in north Queensland, Australia. The first ever "Festival of the Tableland", was held in Herberton on 8 May and 9 May 1981. It then moved to Yungaburra in 1982, where it has been held ever since. Various individuals and groups – including locals, the Cairns Folk Club and the Townsville Folk Club – ran the Festival for the next 11 years. Since 1994, the Festival has been organised by a committee of North Queenslanders.

The festival celebrates world-wide folk traditions through music, storytelling, circus, dance, and crafts, and features musicians, dancers, circus and fire artists, comedians and festival performers. Yungaburra is surrounded by World Heritage rainforests, lakes, waterfalls and Queensland's tallest mountain, Mount Bartle Frere.

== Festival Name Change ==
From 2010, the festival will be called: Tablelands Folk Festival. This development means the festival celebrates its 30th anniversary in 2010 with the first Folk Festival held on the Tablelands in 1981 at Herberton.

The Festival was called the Tablelands Folk Festival (TFF) for 21 years, the name was then changed to Yungaburra Folk Festival (YFF) for 8 years. The membership voted to return to the former name in February 2010.

The members of TFF Assn. Inc. have always been the organising team behind the Yungaburra Folk Festival. The TFF Members' post-festival analysis and plenary session of November 2007 led to an awareness of the need to plan for the longer term, within the TFF Objects and Mission Statement.

This development allows for future events at locations around the Tablelands region, and provides an avenue to umbrella periodic events, showcase performances, bush dances or other festivals. Confusion amongst the public was apparent in 2009, with the Yungaburra Folk Festival presenting the Thursday night anniversary concert at Herberton. The change of name will alleviate such issues.
