= The Pinnacles (Atherton Tableland) =

Volcanic mounds on the Atherton Tableland

The Pinnacles (Atherton Tableland) Seven Sisters
- Cinder cones
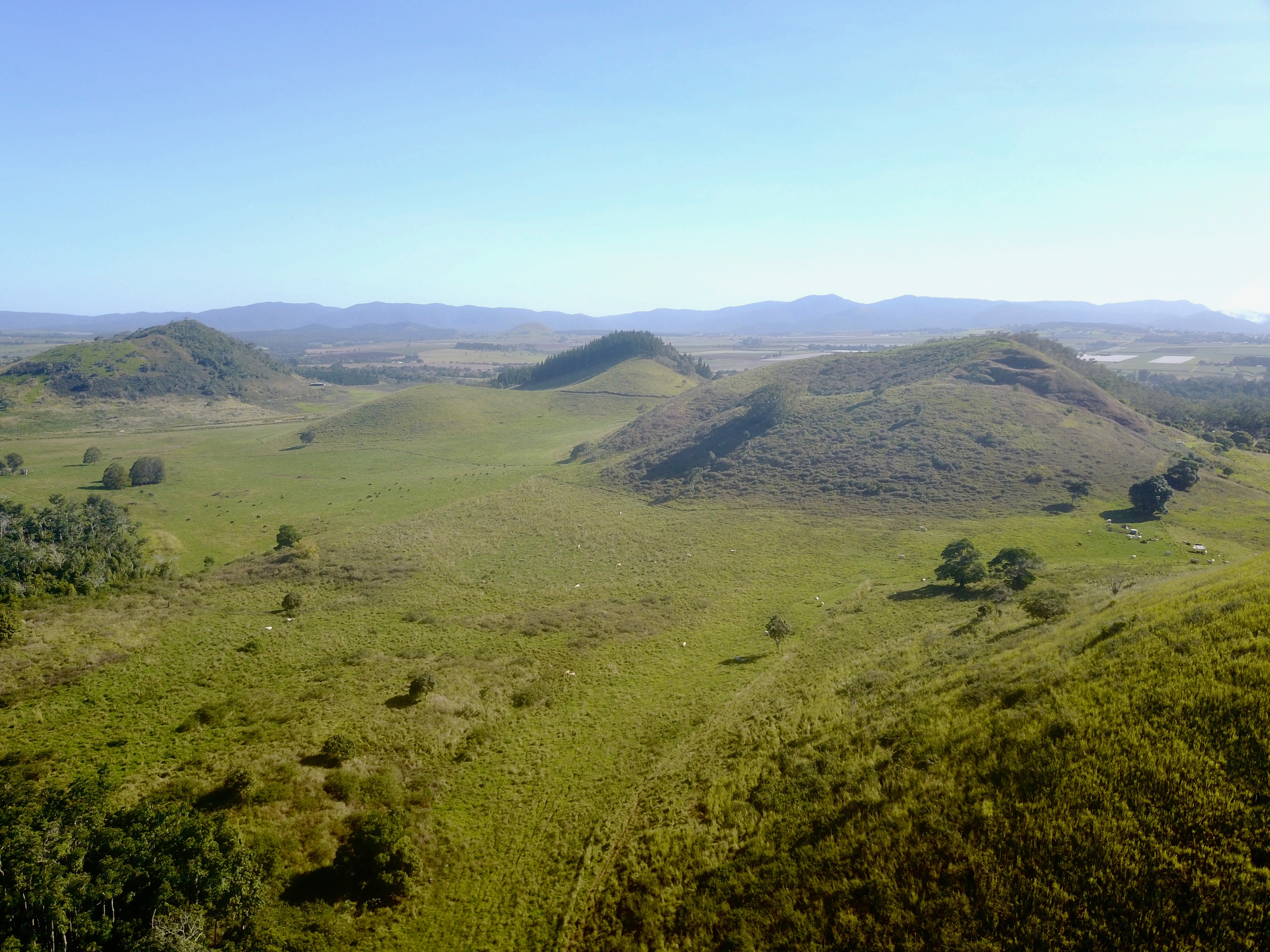
- Aerial view of The Pinnacles, Atherton Tableland, looking to the southwest

- Location within Queensland
- Coordinates: 17°16′00″S 145°33′00″E

The Pinnacles (also known as the Seven Sisters) are a series of seven volcanic cinder cones on the Atherton Tableland, near Yungaburra, Queensland, Australia. They were formed more than 350,000 years ago.

The vents have an overall southwest-northeast alignment, which suggests that the ascending magma utilised a pre-existing fracture within the Earth's crust. Several of the craters are breached to the southeast, possibly due to the prevailing southeast winds blowing ash and scoria to the northwest and so building the cones more to that side. Parts of the rocky basalt flows are still densely forested and can be seen surrounding the Curtain Fig Tree.

== See also ==
- Lake Barrine
- Lake Eacham (Yidyam)
- Lake Tinaroo
- Mount Hypipamee Crater
