= Bank of New South Wales building, Yungaburra =

Bank of New South Wales Building, Yungaburra
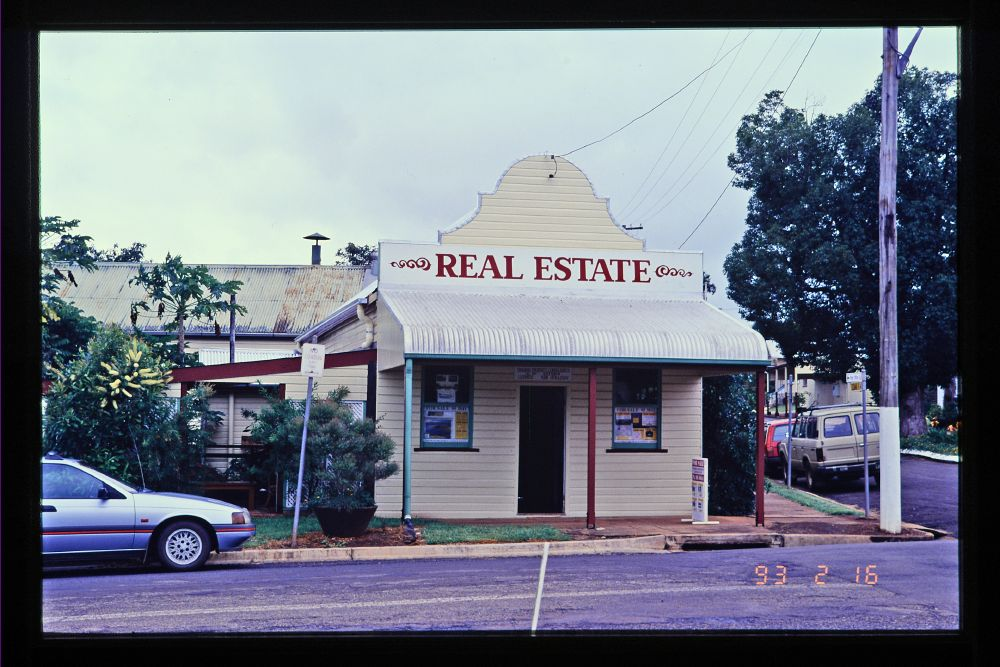
- Bank of New South Wales Building, 1993

- Location within Queensland Location within Australia
- 17.2711°S 145.5828°E
- Location: 27 Atherton Road, Yungaburra, Tablelands Region, Queensland, Australia

History
- Design period: 1900–1914 (early 20th century)
- Built: c. 1914

Queensland Heritage Register
- Official name: 27 Atherton Road, Yungaburra, Bank of New South Wales
- Type: state heritage (built)
- Designated: 21 October 1992
- Reference no.: 600468
- Significant period: 1910s (fabric) c. 1914–1967 (historical use)

Bank of New South Wales is a heritage-listed former bank building at 27 Atherton Road, Yungaburra, Tablelands Region, Queensland, Australia. It was built c. 1914. It was added to the Queensland Heritage Register on 21 October 1992.

== History ==
The former Bank of New South Wales is a single storeyed timber building erected c. 1914 for local timber merchant Arthur Herbert Belson on the corner of Atherton Road and Cedar Street. For over fifty years, it housed the local branch of the Bank of New South Wales.

Yungaburra, previously known as Allumbah (meaning red cedar) Pocket, was surveyed in 1886 by Surveyor Rankin as part of a government village settlement scheme. In 1910, the Cairns to Millaa Millaa railway reached the town, which was renamed to avoid confusion with another similarly named town. In 1926, the Gillies Highway between Cairns and Gordonvale was opened. Fuelled by the resulting tourist trade to the nearby lakes, the town experienced a second period of development.

In 1914, the building which was sited opposite the new Yungaburra railway station, was leased to the Bank of New South Wales. Previously the Bank had occupied temporary premises in the town. In 1921, the property was purchased by the Bank. Photographs at this time show the building to be single skinned. According to local folklore, the bank was part of a New Year's Eve prank, in which the railway gates were removed, taken across the road, and left on the awning of the bank. This was regarded as a feat of strength on the part of the young people of the town.

In 1965, the Yungaburra branch was converted to an agency attached to the Atherton branch of the Bank. In 1967, the agency was closed and the property sold by the Bank of New South Wales in the following year. It was acquired by the present owners in 1988.

== Description ==
This single-storeyed timber building with a corrugated iron gable roof is located on the corner of Atherton Road and Cedar Street in the centre of Yungaburra. Originally an exposed framed, single skin building, it has been clad in chamferboard.

The street frontage to Atherton Road to the east has a reconstructed curved corrugated iron awning with a shaped gable above. The building is divided into two tenancies, with the Atherton Road end having a central entry from the awning and the rear tenancy accessed via a timber deck off Cedar Street.

The building has principally sash windows, with some later casements. A lean-to bathroom has been added to the southwest. The building has been recently refurbished, with new timber floors and some new windows. The rear of the site is grassed.

== Heritage listing ==
The former Bank of New South Wales Building was listed on the Queensland Heritage Register on 21 October 1992 having satisfied the following criteria.

The place is important in demonstrating the evolution or pattern of Queensland's history.

The building is important in demonstrating the pattern of Queensland's history, in particular the development of Yungaburra and the Atherton Tableland.

The place is important because of its aesthetic significance.

It exhibits a range of aesthetic characteristics valued by the local community, in particular its contribution, through scale, form and materials, to the Yungaburra townscape.
