= St Marks Anglican Church, Yungaburra =

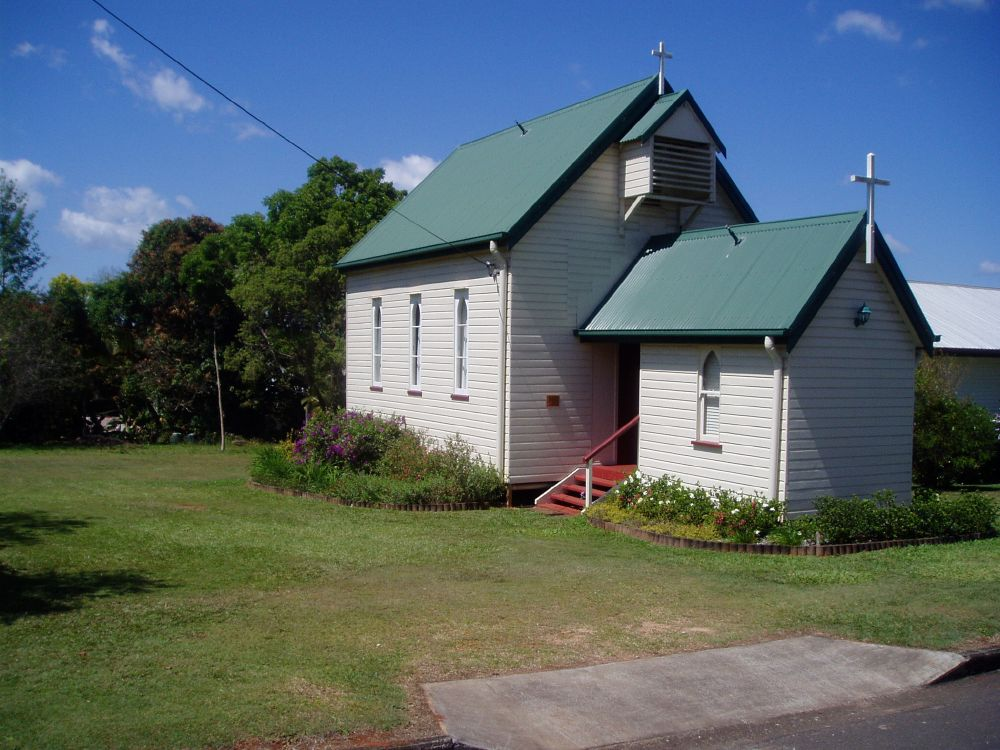
- St Marks Anglican Church, 2003

- Location within Queensland Location within Australia
- 17.2684°S 145.5822°E
- Location: 7 Eacham Road, Yungaburra, Tablelands Region, Queensland, Australia

History
- Design period: 1900–1914 (early 20th century)
- Built: 1912

Queensland Heritage Register
- Official name: St Marks Anglican Church, St Marks Church of England
- Type: state heritage (built)
- Designated: 21 October 1992
- Reference no.: 600484
- Significant period: 1912 (fabric)
- Significant components: furniture/fittings

St Marks Anglican Church is a heritage-listed church at 7 Eacham Road, Yungaburra, Tablelands Region, Queensland, Australia. It was built in 1912. It is also known as St Marks Church of England. It was added to the Queensland Heritage Register on 21 October 1992.

== History ==
St Mark's Church was built in 1912 to serve Anglicans in the newly developing township of Yungaburra and the surrounding district.

The first Europeans on the Atherton Tablelands were engaged in timbergetting and mining, but the rich volcanic soil and cool climate was thought particularly suitable for agriculture. In 1888 the government surveyor marked out a village settlement at Allumbah Pocket, later to be named Yungaburra. The Village Settlement scheme, introduced in 1885, offered 40 acre farm blocks plus home sites clustered as a village. Around the same time as the Tablelands railway from the port of Cairns to the Tableland was begun, although it took far longer to reach its objective than originally envisaged. The first farms at Allumbah were taken up in 1891 and the settlers grew vegetables, maize and kept dairy cows. However, without proximity to markets and reliable transport, the scheme was not successful. The Closer Settlement Act 1906 provided for groups of authorised people to take up land prior to it being thrown open for general settlement and many miners came from Charters Towers which was by then in decline. Some people settled as part of groups and some individually. A small town developed to service the area and in 1910, the railway line linking Cairns with the Tablelands reached Allumbah, which was then renamed Yungaburra to avoid confusion with another similarly named town. The Post Office Directory for this year lists almost all residents as "selectors." A period of rapid development began with the construction of a saw mill, a hotel and a number of shops and houses near the Yungaburra railway station. In 1911, Eacham Shire was formed.

The first Anglican services in Yungaburra were held in William's hotel hall by members of the Brotherhood of St Barnabas (also known as the Bush Brothers). The Brotherhood was established in 1902 by the Reverend Aneurin Vaughan-Williams, Rector of Herberton. Originally consisting only of Vaughan-Williams and one other priest, it was modelled on the Brotherhood of St Andrew founded in central Queensland a few years earlier. It was intended to address the problem of providing pastoral care to a large and sparsely settled area and the Brotherhood initially visited mainly mining camps. The Brothers travelled where they were needed and remained unmarried during the two years of their term of service. They gained considerable respect for their work and in 1908, George Frodsham, Bishop of North Queensland, gave the movement impetus by recruiting in England.

The first service at St Mark's church was conducted on 5 December 1912 and the first baptism on 16 March 1913, but the church was not dedicated until 7 November 1913. In 1918 a vestry was added at the front of the church.

In 1926, the Gillies Highway between Yungaburra and Gordonvale was opened, providing the first trafficable road from the coast to the Tablelands. Yungaburra became a gateway to the natural attractions of the area and a blossoming tourist trade to the nearby lakes created a second period of development. Tourism has remained a major industry in the area.

St Mark's does not have a resident priest, but is served as part of a parish which is centred on Atherton, where a married rector replaced the Brothers in 1951, and also covers Herberton and Malanda. A self- help program was commenced by the congregation in July 1998 that raised funds to replace the roof and carry out conservation work in 2000–2001.

== Description ==
St Mark's is a small single-storeyed timber building set on low, square section metal posts. It has a steeply pitched gabled roof clad in corrugated iron. To the rear of the church is a 3 sided apse and placed centrally at the front is a lower and narrower gabled roof covering a small vestry which is linked to the church by an entrance porch. This is entered by timber stairs on the left hand side. A probable matching entrance on the opposite side is now closed. Above this, under the eaves of the church, is a louvred belfry.

Timber double doors lead from the porch into the church, which is lit by plain lancet windows, as is the vestry. The interior is simple and austere and has a coved ceiling of stained timber boards which follow the shape of the apse. The walls are painted and there is a timber floor. The original pews with flame-shaped ends have been recently refinished.

== Heritage listing ==
St Marks Anglican Church was listed on the Queensland Heritage Register on 21 October 1992 having satisfied the following criteria.

The place is important in demonstrating the evolution or pattern of Queensland's history.

St Mark's Church, as a modestly scaled and finished church built in a new farming settlement, illustrates the development of Yungaburra and of the Anglican Church in Queensland. Constructed by community endeavour and served by the Brotherhood of St Barnabas for some years, it illustrates the way in which the Church endeavoured to reach small and isolated communities which could not support an incumbent.

The place is important in demonstrating the principal characteristics of a particular class of cultural places.

St Mark's church is a good and intact example of the type of simple timber chapel which served many new settlements as their first church.

The place is important because of its aesthetic significance.

In its form, scale and detail it makes a substantial contribution to the built character of Yungaburra.

The place has a strong or special association with a particular community or cultural group for social, cultural or spiritual reasons.

The church has a strong connection with the Anglican community in Yungaburra, having served the village and surrounding farms since the early years of the 20th century. It also provides a testimony to the work of the Brotherhood of St Barnabas in providing pastoral care to the developing Tablelands.
