= Yungaburra Community Centre =

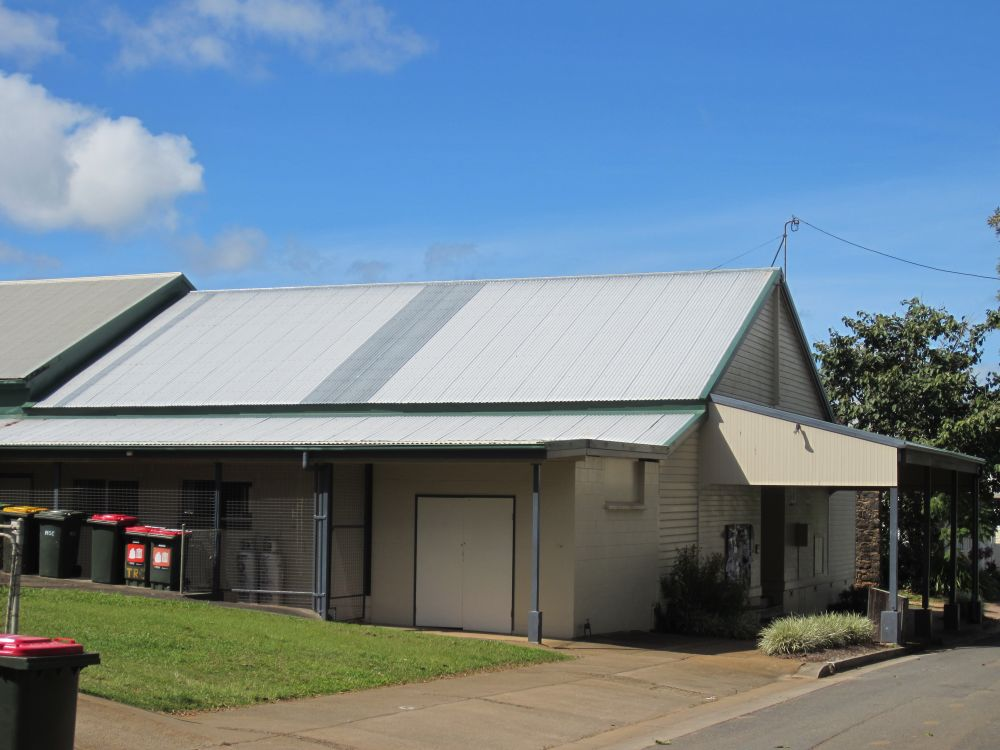
- Community Centre, 2015

- Location within Queensland Location within Australia
- 17.2702°S 145.5823°E
- Location: 19 Cedar Street, Yungaburra, Tablelands Region, Queensland, Australia

History
- Design period: 1900–1914 (early 20th century)
- Built: 1910–c. 1926

Queensland Heritage Register
- Official name: Community Centre, Tivoli picture theatre, Williams Estate Hall, Yungaburra Hall
- Type: state heritage (built)
- Designated: 21 October 1992
- Reference no.: 600479
- Significant period: 1910, c. 1926 (fabric); 1910–1957, 1928–1969 (historical); 1910–ongoing (social)
- Significant components: kitchen/kitchen house, toilet block/earth closet/water closet, stage/sound shell, wall/s

Yungaburra Community Centre is a heritage-listed community hall at 19 Cedar Street, Yungaburra, Tablelands Region, Queensland, Australia. It was built from 1910 to c. 1926. It is also known as Tivoli picture theatre, Williams Estate Hall, and Yungaburra Hall. It was added to the Queensland Heritage Register on 21 October 1992.

== History ==
The earliest section of the building was constructed in 1910 as a hall for the Lake Eacham Hotel at Yungaburra and was originally situated beside the hotel. It was moved to its present site to the rear of the hotel when this was extended c. 1926 and has served as a venue for a variety of social events and as a cinema.

The first Europeans on the Atherton Tablelands were engaged in timbergetting and mining, but the rich soil and cool climate were thought particularly suitable for the development of agriculture. In 1885 a Village Settlement scheme was introduced which offered settlers 40-acre farm blocks with home sites clustered as a village. At the same time the Tablelands railway from the port of Cairns to the Tableland was begun, although it took far longer to reach its objective than originally envisaged. In 1888 a village settlement was laid out at Allumbah and the first farms were taken up in 1891, though the scheme proved unsuccessful. The railway reached Mareeba in 1895 and Atherton in 1903, greatly improving access to the area. Following new Land Acts in the early 1900s more people took up land around Allumbah and a small commercial centre developed to serve them.

The land on which the hotel and hall were built, and which was to become the commercial heart of Yungaburra, was part of an Agricultural Farm selected by George O'Donnell in 1899. In 1900 the land was sold to George Wedderburn and subdivided into numerous small blocks from 1910 onwards. This was the year in which the railway reached the settlement, renamed Yungaburra to avoid confusion with a similarly named town. The Railway Commissioner had acquired six acres of Wedderburn's land and the position of the new Yungaburra railway station caused a geographic shift in focus from the original settlement that was located north west of the new commercial centre. Buildings were constructed or relocated near the railway and 2 blocks close to the station were purchased by AS and FC Williams for a new hotel.

Henry S. Williams had arrived in Australia in the 1860s and worked in a number of occupations before taking up land at Scrubby Creek on the Tablelands. After losing his dairy cattle to tick in 1895, Williams turned to business and ran a store and butchery at Scrubby Creek and the Carriers Arms hotel at Carrington. He then acquired land in the original Allumbah settlement in 1898 and established a store. He was killed in an accident in 1905, but the family business was continued by his sons under the name of "Estate H.S. Williams". In 1907 they established a shanty hotel in Allumbah to serve packers and the navvies constructing the railway inching its way towards the town. The railway link triggered a period of rapid development with the construction of a sawmill, the hotel and a number of shops and houses. The hall was built as an adjunct to the hotel and was used for dances, although it also served for a variety of other uses including religious services and the first meeting of the Eacham Shire Council on 22 February 1911. It was then known as the Williams Estate Hall. The Williams family's interest in this area grew as they acquired further land over the next few years and built shops and a motor dealership and garage on it.

In 1926, the Gillies Highway between Yungaburra and Gordonvale was opened, providing the first trafficable road to the Tablelands. It improved access to the area for tourists and in anticipation of this, the Lake Eacham Hotel was extended significantly along the main road and the hall was then moved to land at the rear of the hotel, purchased for the purpose. The developing tourist trade to the nearby lakes created a second period of development with many tourists staying at the Lake Eacham Hotel. In the 1920s Yungaburra was one of a number of small towns on the railway line serviced by travelling projectionists, or "picture show men" who showed silent films in the hall. These included Ted Stoltz and the Gilders, father and son. Films were shown at the hall for many years and from 1928 it was the venue for the Tivoli picture theatre, although it was also used for other functions.

A wall built of local volcanic stone is located across a narrow laneway from the hall and is the only remaining wall of a building used to accommodate staff from the hotel. The insurance company is said to have objected to its closeness to the hall and the wall had to be constructed as a fire safety precaution.

The hall was considerably extended after it was moved and the join between the old and new sections can still be seen. Side aisles were added and the original side walls were removed. The ceiling and walls were lined internally in the 1950s. In 1957 Alfred King and Alice Jones (Mrs King) bought the hall. In 1964 Mr King died and Mrs King continued to run the hall as the Tivoli until 1969. By the time it was purchased in July 1971 by the Eacham Shire Council, it had fallen into disrepair. Renovation was undertaken by the Yungaburra and District Progress Association and continued over many years. Works undertaken included the replacement of the floorboards and the building of a concrete block extension at the side. In the 1980s a concrete toilet block was built beside it. The hall now has a new roof, which remains unlined over the stage area. The kitchen has been upgraded and a modern freestanding bar has been constructed in the corner to the right hand side of the entrance. In 1993 the title to the hall passed to the Yungaburra and District Progress Association. The hall is still used for such events as dances and weddings, largely by people from surrounding towns.

== Description ==
The community hall is a timber single-storey building set on stumps. It is rectangular in plan and its long axis is set at right angles to Cedar Street. The roof is gabled and clad with corrugated iron and has a raised section towards the rear over the stage. There is an awning to the street supported by timber posts. The entry is central and approached by concrete steps. There is a concrete block addition with a low-pitched skillion roof to the western side.

Inside, the building comprises a large rectangular space with side aisles. To the right of the entrance is a large modern bar and a kitchen is located to the left. There is a stage at the rear of the hall with small dressing rooms at each side. The wings and backdrop are decorated with modern paintings of trees and a view of Lake Barrine. The stage has storage lockers along the front.

A freestanding toilet block has been added on the western side.

A large freestanding wall constructed of volcanic rock is on the southeast boundary. It can be seen that it was once a wall of a building that has since been removed.

== Heritage listing ==
Community Centre was listed on the Queensland Heritage Register on 21 October 1992 having satisfied the following criteria.

The place is important in demonstrating the evolution or pattern of Queensland's history.

The Community Centre, as the venue for a wide variety of events from the first meeting of the Eacham Shire Council, to church services and public entertainments, is important in demonstrating the development of Yungaburra. As an entertainment facility linked to a hotel that catered largely for tourists, it is also important in illustrating the development of the early tourist industry in the region.

The place is important because of its aesthetic significance.

As a public building within a group of structures of similar age, scale and materials, the hall makes an important contribution to the built character of Yungaburra.

The place has a strong or special association with a particular community or cultural group for social, cultural or spiritual reasons.

As the venue for a wide variety of social events, since the earliest years of the town's development, the hall has an important association with the community of Yungaburra and the surrounding area.

The place has a special association with the life or work of a particular person, group or organisation of importance in Queensland's history.

As a building constructed as part of the Williams Estate, the hall has an important association with the Williams family who made a major contribution to the commercial development of Yungaburra. It also has associations with early projectionists in the area and with the local community.
