= Minbun =

- Suburb
- Interactive map of Minbun
- Coordinates: 17.4869°S 145.5488°E
- Country: Australia
- State: Queensland
- LGA: Tablelands Region
- Location: 19.5 km (12.1 mi) S of Malanda; 33.4 km (20.8 mi) SSE of Atherton; 90.2 km (56.0 mi) SSW of Cairns; 1,666 km (1,035 mi) NNW of Brisbane

Government
  - State electorate: Hill
  - Federal division: Kennedy

Area
  - Total: 34.5 km^{2} (13.3 sq mi)

Population
  - Total: 60 (2021 census)
  - Density: 1.74/km^{2} (4.5/sq mi)
- Time zone: UTC+10:00 (AEST)
- Postcode: 4886
Suburbs around Minbun
Tarzali	Tarzali	Tarzali
Upper Barron	Minbun	Moregatta
Evelyn	Evelyn	Moregatta

Minbun is a rural locality in the Tablelands Region, Queensland, Australia. In the 2021 census, Minbun had a population of 60 people.

== Geography ==
Minbun railway station is an abandoned railway station (17.4742°S 145.5825°E) on the now-closed Millaa Millaa branch of the Tablelands railway line.

The Millaa Millaa–Malanda Road runs through the northeast corner.

The western part of the locality is within the Herberton Range National Park. The land use in the rest of the locality is predominantly grazing on native vegetation.

== History ==
The locality takes its name from the Minbun railway station name, which was assigned on 23 July 1920 by the Queensland Railways Department. Some references to the Name Minburn also exist which may be an anglicisation of the Aboriginal name. It is an Aboriginal word meaning brown possum.

There was also a sawmill run by the Kenny Brothers in the 1920s until sometime later, as well as a pig farm and quarry.

Nash Road State School opened on 1 September 1922 under teacher Minnie Kathleine Smith. In May 1925, it was renamed Minbun State School. It closed on 31 December 1974 due to low enrolment numbers. It was located on the north-eastern corner or Nash Road and Millaa Millaa - Malanda Road (17.47854°S 145.58027°E). The Minbun Community Centre Association bought the school buildings. The school teacher's residence was relocated to be used as a teacher's residence in Malanda.

Currently the primary school located near the corner of Nash Road is now being used as a private residence.

The railway line between Kairi railway station and Millaa Millaa railway station (including Minbun railway station) closed in 1964 and most of the track has long since been removed, but numerous cuttings and track paths are still visible locally.

== Demographics ==
In the 2016 census, Minbun had a population of 75 people.

In the 2021 census, Minbun had a population of 60 people.

== Education ==
There are no schools in Minbun. The nearest government primary school is Millaa Millaa State School in Millaa Millaa to the south-east. The nearest government secondary school is Malanda State High School in Malanda to the north.
