= Maalan, Queensland =

Maalan
- Suburb
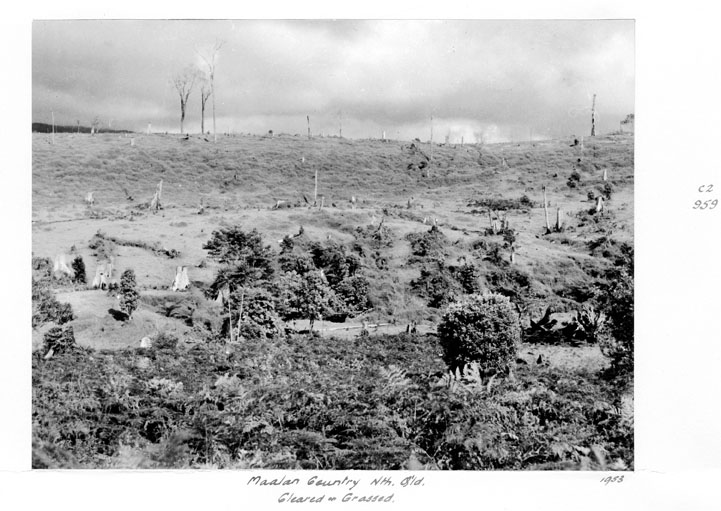
- Cleared land, Maalan, 1953

- Interactive map of Maalan
- Coordinates: 17.6077°S 145.5916°E
- Country: Australia
- State: Queensland
- LGA: Tablelands Region
- Location: 16.7 km (10.4 mi) S of Millaa Millaa; 17.9 km (11.1 mi) E of Ravenshoe; 58.1 km (36.1 mi) SSE of Atherton; 115 km (71 mi) SSW of Cairns; 1,768 km (1,099 mi) NNW of Brisbane

Government
  - State electorate: Hill
  - Federal division: Kennedy

Area
  - Total: 24.2 km^{2} (9.3 sq mi)

Population
  - Total: 26 (2021 census)
  - Density: 1.074/km^{2} (2.78/sq mi)
- Time zone: UTC+10:00 (AEST)
- Postcode: 4886
Suburbs around Maalan
Beatrice	Beatrice	Middlebrook
Ravenshoe	Maalan	Palmerston
Koombooloomba	Koombooloomba	Koombooloomba

Maalan is a rural locality in the Tablelands Region, Queensland, Australia. In the 2021 census, Maalan had a population of 26 people.

== Geography ==
The land use is predominantly dairy farming which occurs in the valley areas (elevation approximately 900–1000 metres above sea level). In the west of the locality is the Cardwell Range with peaks to 1170 metres; part of this land is within the Tully Falls National Park. In the north is the Maalan National Park.

Maalan Road is the main route through the locality.

== History ==
In 1950, the Millaa Millaa branch of the Queensland Dairymen's Association proposing opening up the land in Maalan for farming. The Minister for Lands responded that the land had valuable cabinet timbers which would be sold and removed before opening up the land for sale. In June 1952, the Surveyor General of Queensland, John Percival Harvey, inspected the area. In November 1952, the Queensland Government proposed releasing 6,300 acres (2,500 ha) of land in Maalan.

In April 1953, 36 blocks each of approximately 240 acres were sold to intending dairy farmers. In September 1953, the selectors were busy clearing the land with a number of them already living on their blocks. In October 1953, the Maalan settlers met to negotiate a route for the supply of their milk and cream to the factory at Millaa Millaa. In November 1953, a bush fire brigade was formed at Maalan. In April 1954, the Maalan settlers were praised for their efforts in pioneering this new district. In November 1954, plans to commence dairying in the district were delayed by a plague of grasshoppers which ate the newly established dairy pastures.

== Demographics ==
In the 2016 census, Maalan had a population of 26 people.

In the 2021 census, Maalan had a population of 26 people.

== Education ==
There are no schools in Maalan. The nearest government primary schools are Millaa Millaa State School in Millaa Millaa to the north and Ravenshoe State School in neighbouring Ravenshoe to the west. The nearest government secondary school is Ravenshoe State School (to Year 12).
