= Evelyn Scrub War Memorial =

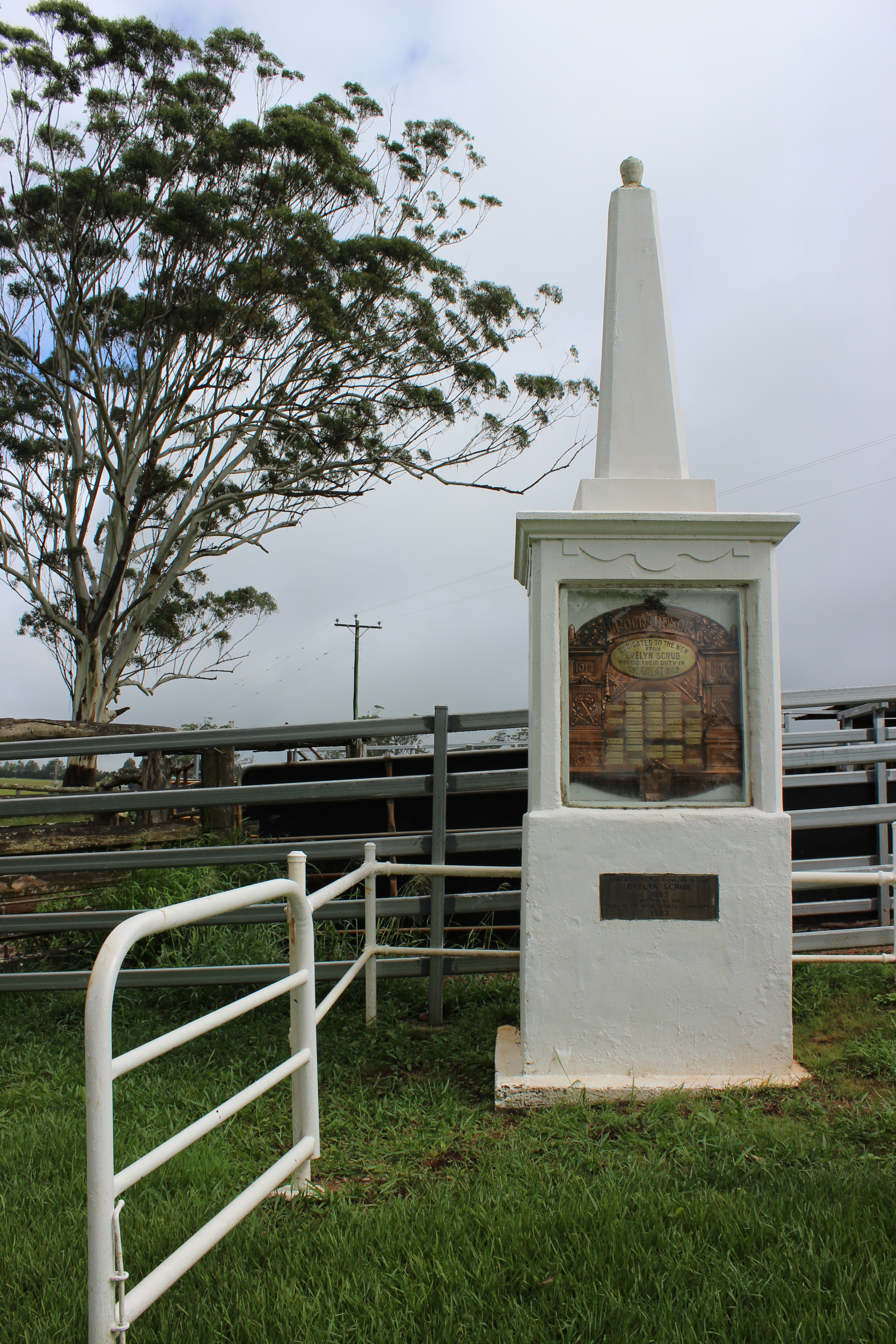
- Evelyn Scrub War Memorial, 2017

- Location within Queensland Location within Australia
- 17.5015°S 145.454°E
- Location: Jonsson Road, Evelyn, Tablelands Region, Queensland, Australia

History
- Design period: 1914–1919 (World War I)
- Built: c. 1919

Queensland Heritage Register
- Official name: Evelyn Scrub War Memorial
- Type: state heritage (built)
- Designated: 28 February 2003
- Reference no.: 602138
- Significant period: 1910s (fabric)
- Significant components: plaque, fence/wall – perimeter, flagpole/flagstaff, memorial – obelisk

Evelyn Scrub War Memorial is a heritage-listed memorial at Jonsson Road, Evelyn, Tablelands Region, Queensland, Australia. It was built c. 1919. It was added to the Queensland Heritage Register on 28 February 2003.

== History ==
The Evelyn Scrub War Memorial was erected after the First World War (1914–18) on land set aside for the purpose by Edward Daniel, c. 1919. It lists the names of all the men from the Evelyn district who had served in the war. Forty-one names are recorded on the memorial.

In 1882 land on the Evelyn Tableland was surveyed into blocks between 160 and 640 acres (65 and 259 ha). Selections were taken up as dairy and agricultural farms. Evelyn township was established on the edge of the rainforest "scrub" in the 1890s as a commercial centre for the Evelyn Tableland farming district. Evelyn Scrub State School was established in 1895. The town had two timber mills, a town hall where congregations for the Salvation Army, Presbyterians and Methodists were held, shops including a general store and butchers shop and some small houses. The railway connecting Ravenshoe with Cairns was completed in 1910 and a horse drawn timber tramway named the Evelyn Scrub Tramline Co was built from Evelyn to connect with the railway line at Turulka about 10 kilometres (6.2 mi) away and operated until 1921. The railway was used to transport timber from the sawmills to the port of Cairns. In 1918 a wide variety of crops were grown in the region, including English and sweet potato, maize, bananas, pineapples, grapes, oranges, apples, strawberries, peaches, plums, lemons, pawpaw and honey.

Following the outbreak of war in Europe in 1914, approximately 90% of the young men from the Evelyn Scrub eventually enlisted for overseas service. Some never returned, and of those who did, very few went back on the land. Community send-offs were held for the volunteers of the Evelyn district at the Pioneer Hotel in Tumoulin. On their return the soldiers were accorded a public welcome.

Australia, and Queensland in particular, had few civic monuments before the First World War. The memorials erected in its wake became our first national monuments, recording the devastating impact of the war on a young nation. Australia lost 60,000 from a population of about 4 million, representing one in five of those who served. No previous or subsequent war has made such an impact on the nation.

Memorials became a spontaneous and highly visible expression of national grief. To those who erected them, they were as sacred as the grave sites, substitute graves for the Australians whose bodies lay in battlefield cemeteries in Europe and the Middle East. British policy decreed that the Empire war dead were to be buried where they fell. The word "cenotaph", commonly applied to war memorials at the time, literally means "empty tomb".

The Evelyn Tablelands was severely affected by the prolonged drought of 1915. It was the worst drought on record and cattle were sent away to the newly opened pastures of Millaa Millaa. In 1918 a cyclone again devastated the area, causing extensive damage to crops through flooding and heavy rains. Another drought in 1923 contributed to the economic decline of the Evelyn Tableland. The depression of the early 1930s had a major impact on the towns of the Atherton Tablelands. The three sawmills that had operated on Evelyn Tableland, between them producing £7,705 worth of timber in 1917, were dismantled and removed. Shops and houses from the township were also moved as people sought greater opportunities elsewhere. The school was closed in 1946.

The Evelyn War Memorial is now all that now remains of the town. It serves as a reminder of those who served in far away battles and is also an illustration of the once bustling farming and timber getting community in an area that is now sparsely populated. A dawn service is held at the Memorial each ANZAC Day in commemoration of those who served.

== Description ==
The area of the old township of Evelyn is comprised today of grassy paddocks and tall eucalyptus trees, and is used as grazing land for cattle. Timber cattle yards are constructed immediately behind the memorial.

The Memorial stands on private property on the Jonsson Road, off the Tumoulin to Ravenshoe Road in the southern Atherton Tablelands.

The Memorial is in the form of a substantial pedestal supporting a narrow pointed obelisk topped with a spherical object. The entire monument is concrete. Forty-one names and fates of the men from Evelyn Scrub who served in the Great War are attached to a brass plaque secured to one side of the pedestal behind a glass screen. Of particular interest is the inclusion of the name of an aboriginal person (designated as such) listed among those who died in service. A second plaque is fixed below the first, dedicated to the pioneers of the Evelyn Scrub by the Evelyn Social and Sports Club in 1983.

A single flagstaff stands five metres from the memorial on the southern side. There are no associated gardens or plantings remaining at the Memorial.

== Heritage listing ==
Evelyn Scrub War Memorial was listed on the Queensland Heritage Register on 28 February 2003 having satisfied the following criteria.

The place is important in demonstrating the evolution or pattern of Queensland's history.

Evelyn Scrub War Memorial, erected c. 1919, is significant historically as a record of community and district participation in the First World War and as an embodiment of the prevailing sentiments and attitudes at the time. As the last standing structure at what was once the town of Evelyn it illustrates the growth and decline of farming communities in the evolution of the history of the Atherton Tablelands.

The place has a strong or special association with a particular community or cultural group for social, cultural or spiritual reasons.

As a focus for ANZAC Day ceremonies it is highly valued by the community for its spiritual, symbolic, cultural and social associations.

== See also ==
- List of tramways in Queensland
