= Moregatta, Queensland =

Moregatta
- Suburb
- Interactive map of Moregatta
- Coordinates: 17.4913°S 145.5819°E
- Country: Australia
- State: Queensland
- LGA: Tablelands Region
- Location: 18.6 km (11.6 mi) S of Malanda; 36.0 km (22.4 mi) SSE of Atherton; 64.4 km (40.0 mi) W of Innisfail; 93.0 km (57.8 mi) SSW of Cairns; 1,816 km (1,128 mi) NNW of Brisbane

Government
  - State electorate: Hill
  - Federal division: Kennedy

Area
  - Total: 18.2 km^{2} (7.0 sq mi)

Population
  - Total: 62 (2021 census)
  - Density: 3.41/km^{2} (8.82/sq mi)
- Time zone: UTC+10:00 (AEST)
- Postcode: 4886
Suburbs around Moregatta
Minbun	Minbun	Tarzali
Minbun	Moregatta	Millaa Millaa
Evelyn	Millaa Millaa	Millaa Millaa

Moregatta is a rural locality in the Tablelands Region, Queensland, Australia. In the 2021 census, Moregatta had a population of 62 people.

== Geography ==
The south-western part of the locality is part of the Herberton Range National Park. The land use in the rest of the locality is grazing, predominantly dairy cattle.

The Millaa Millaa–Malanda Road runs through from south (Millaa Millaa) to north (Minbun).

== History ==
The locality takes its name from its railway station, which was named 23 July 1920 by the Queensland Railways Department, reportedly being an Aboriginal word, meaning level ground.

The locality was served by Moregatta railway station (17.4897°S 145.5922°E) on the now-closed Millaa Millaa branch of the Tablelands railway line.

Moregatta Provisional School opened on 11 April 1927. In 1930, it became Moregatta State School. In 1935, a new building was constructed for Moregatta State School. The school closed on 7 May 1948. It was at 323 Moregatta Road (17.48438°S 145.59856°E).

== Demographics ==
In the 2016 census, Moregatta had a population of 9 people.

In the 2021 census, Moregatta had a population of 62 people.

== Education ==
There are no schools in Moregatta. The nearest government primary school is Millaa Milla State School in neighbouring Millaa Millaa to the south-east. The nearest government secondary school is Malanda State High School in Malanda to the north.
