= Kureen =

- Suburb
- Interactive map of Kureen
- Coordinates: 17.3366°S 145.5866°E
- Country: Australia
- State: Queensland
- LGA: Tablelands Region
- Location: 2.8 km (1.7 mi) N of Malanda; 18.1 km (11.2 mi) SE of Atherton; 73.2 km (45.5 mi) SW of Cairns; 1,693 km (1,052 mi) NNW of Brisbane

Government
  - State electorate: Hill
  - Federal division: Kennedy

Area
  - Total: 9.6 km^{2} (3.7 sq mi)

Population
  - Total: 158 (2021 census)
  - Density: 16.46/km^{2} (42.6/sq mi)
- Time zone: UTC+10:00 (AEST)
- Postcode: 4885
Suburbs around Kureen
| Peeramon | Peeramon | Peeramon |
| Upper Barron | Kureen | Peeramon |
| Upper Barron | Malanda | Malanda |

Kureen is a rural locality in the Tablelands Region, Queensland, Australia. In the 2021 census, Kureen had a population of 158 people.

== Geography ==
The Johnstone River forms the south-eastern boundary of the locality, while the Malanda - Atherton Road forms the south-west boundary of the locality.

The Millaa Milla branch of the Tablelands railway line enters the locality from the north-east (Peeramon), passes through the Kureen railway station (17.3345°S 145.5962°E) in the centre of the locality and then exits to the south (Malanda). That branch line is now closed and the station dismantled.

The land use is a mixture of grazing on native vegetation, crop growing, and rural residential housing.

== History ==
The locality takes its name from the Kureen railway station, which was assigned by the Queensland Railways Department on 25 April 1910, and is an Aboriginal word, meaning little fissure or crack.

Kureen State School opened on 5 February 1912 and closed in 1958. It was on the eastern side of Peeramon Road (approx 17.3323°S 145.5944°E).

== Demographics ==
In the 2016 census, Kureen had a population of 122 people.

In the 2021 census, Kureen had a population of 158 people.

== Education ==
There are no schools in Kureen. The nearest government primary and secondary schools are Malanda State School and Malanda State High School, both in neighbouring Malanda to the south.

== Facilities ==
Despite the name, Malanda Wastewater Treatment Plant is at 228 English Road in Kureen (17.3300°S 145.6071°E).
