= Upper Barron =

- Suburb
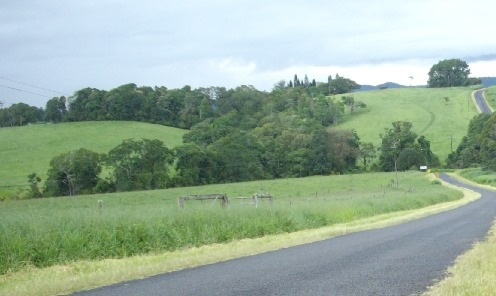
- Belson Road, Upper Barron

- Interactive map of Upper Barron
- Coordinates: 17.3888°S 145.5069°E
- Country: Australia
- State: Queensland
- LGA: Tablelands Region
- Location: 5.8 km (3.6 mi) WSW of Malanda; 19.5 km (12.1 mi) SE of Atherton; 81.2 km (50.5 mi) SW of Cairns; 1,689 km (1,049 mi) NNW of Brisbane

Government
  - State electorate: Hill
  - Federal division: Kennedy

Area
  - Total: 104.4 km^{2} (40.3 sq mi)
- Elevation: 710–1,250 m (2,330–4,100 ft)

Population
  - Total: 503 (2021 census)
  - Density: 4.818/km^{2} (12.479/sq mi)
- Time zone: UTC+10:00 (AEST)
- Postcode: 4883
Suburbs around Upper Barron
Wongabel	East Barron	Peeramon; Kureen
Moomin; Wondecla	Upper Barron	Malanda
Evelyn	Minbun	Jaggan; Tarzali

Upper Barron is a rural locality in the Tablelands Region, Queensland, Australia. In the 2021 census, Upper Barron had a population of 503 people.

== Geography ==
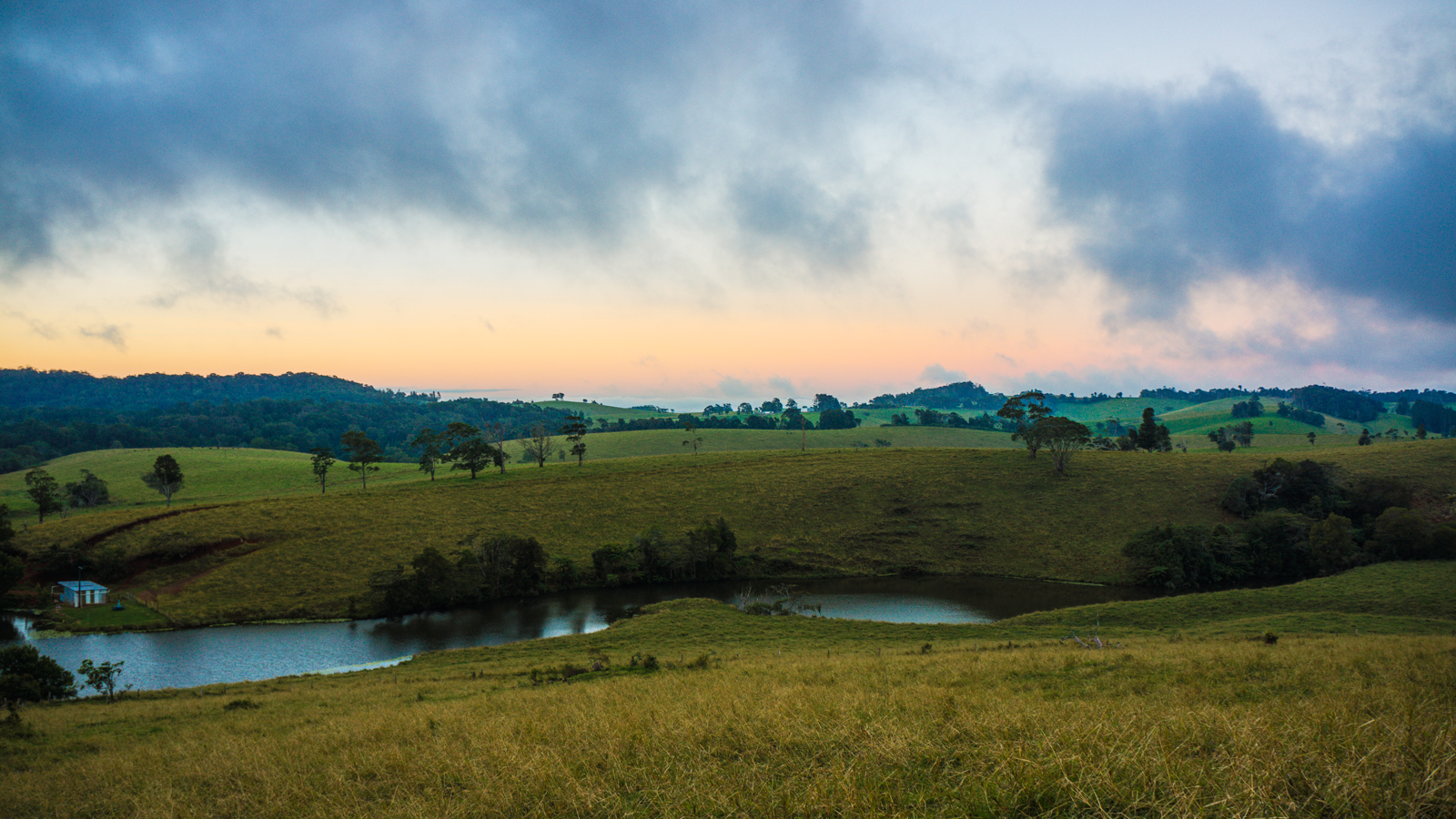
Upper Barron landscape

The western part of the locality is higher and mountainous while the central and eastern parts are lower and flatter. The Barron River rises in the south of the locality and flows in a northerly direction towards Wongabel and East Barron.

Upper Barron has the following mountains and mountain passes (from north to south):

- Mount Weerimba (17.3802°S 145.5208°E) 902 metres (2,959 ft)
- Gum Tree Hill (17.4241°S 145.4915°E) 1,037 metres (3,402 ft)
- Mount Hypipamee (17.4265°S 145.4840°E) 1,030 metres (3,380 ft)
- Longland Gap (17.4639°S 145.4914°E)

All of the western part of the locality is protected, being within one of the Herberton Range National Park, the Herberton Range Conservation Park, or the Mount Hypipamee National Park (17.4255°S 145.4861°E). The predominant land use in the rest of the locality is grazing on native vegetation, except in the north of the locality where there is irrigated crop growing, being mostly sugarcane.

The Kennedy Highway enters the locality from the north-west (Wongabel) and exits to the south-west (Evelyn). The Malanda–Atherton Road runs through the northeastern corner.

== History ==
Upper Barron was previously a locality in both the Shire of Atherton and the Shire of Eacham, both of which were part of the 2008 local government amalgamation which created the Tablelands Region.

Upper Barron State School opened on 31 January 1911. It was mothballed on 31 December 2008 as there were only nine students. It closed on 31 December 2009. It was at 9570 Kennedy Highway (17.3827°S 145.5145°E). The school's website was archived.

Mount Hypipamee National Park (17.4255°S 145.4861°E) was established on 16 January 1982.

== Demographics ==
In the 2016 census, Upper Barron had a population of 451 people.

In the 2021 census, Upper Barron had a population of 503 people.

== Education ==
There are no schools in Upper Barron. The nearest government primary schools are Malanda State School in neighbouring Malanda to the east, Atherton State School in Atherton to the north, and Yungaburra State School in Yungaburra to the north-east. The nearest government secondary schools are Malanda State High School in Malanda and Atherton State High School in Atheron.
