= Maalan National Park =

National park in Australia

- IUCN category II (national park)
- Location within Queensland
- Location: Queensland
- Nearest city: Ravenshoe
- Coordinates: 17°34′5″S 145°33′12″E
- Area: 2,473 ha (9.55 sq mi)
- Established: 2005
- Governing body: Queensland Parks and Wildlife Service

Maalan National Park is a national park in the Tablelands Region of Far North Queensland, Australia. There are two sections to the park. The largest section occupies the western third of Beatrice and the eastern fringe of Ravenshoe on the Atherton Tableland. The smaller section is in the north of Maalan. It belongs to the Wet Tropics of Queensland bioregion. The park was established to protect significant animal and plant communities. The areas were previously known as Dirran State Forest. It is adjacent to Tully Gorge National Park and Mount Fisher Forest Reserve.

Mount Fisher is found within the park. It is Queensland's third highest peak and the most elevated volcano in Northern Australia.

The park provides habitat for the endangered spotted-tailed Quoll, large-eared horseshoe bat and the vulnerable flute-nosed bat. A total of four rare or threatened species have been recorded in the park. It is also home to over 500 native plants.

== See also ==
- Protected areas of Queensland
