= Atherton–Malanda–Millaa Millaa Road =

Road route in Queensland, Australia

Atherton–Malanda–Millaa Millaa Road Malanda–Atherton Road, Millaa Millaa–Malanda Road Queensland

General information
- Type: Rural road
- Length: 39.0 km (24 mi)
- Route number(s): State Route 25

Major junctions
- North end: Kennedy Highway, Atherton
- Malanda–Upper Barron Road; Malanda–Lake Barrine Road; East Evelyn Road; Beatrice Way
- South end: Palmerston Highway, Millaa Millaa

Location(s)
- Major settlements: Malanda

Atherton–Malanda–Millaa Millaa Road is a continuous 39.0-kilometre (24.2 mi) road route in the Tablelands local government area of Queensland, Australia. It has two official names, Malanda–Atherton Road and Millaa Millaa–Malanda Road. The entire route is signed as part of State Route 25. Malanda–Atherton Road is a state-controlled district road (number 645), while Millaa Millaa–Malanda Road is part regional and part district (number 641).

== Route description ==
The road starts at an intersection with the Kennedy Highway in Atherton. It runs east, southeast and east as State Route 25, before entering East Barron. Crossing East Barron it turns south into Upper Barron, where it then turns southeast before passing the exit to Malanda–Upper Barron Road to the southwest. Before entering Malanda the road turns east until it reaches the exit to Malanda–Lake Barrine Road to the east, where it turns south. This intersection is the point where the official name changes to Millaa Millaa–Malanda Road.

From Malanda the road continues south through Jaggan, Tarzali, Minbun and Moregatta to Millaa Millaa, where it passes the exit to East Evelyn Road to the southwest as it turns east. Turning northeast it reaches an intersection with Beatrice Way and Main Street, where it ends. State Route 25 continues northeast as Palmerston Highway.

The road is fully sealed to at least a two lane standard.

Malanda–Atherton Road passes through undulating country, having 670 metres (2,200 ft) with an incline greater than 5%.

Millaa Millaa–Malanda Road passes through hilly country, having 4.3 kilometres (2.7 mi) greater than 5% and 340 metres (1,120 ft) greater than 10%.

== History ==
Atherton was surveyed in 1885. It became the administrative centre for the district, which hosted timber, mining and agricultural industries. Until the railway arrived in 1903 it was a stopping place on the coach road from Mareeba to Herberton.

Malanda was first settled by Europeans in 1907, and after clearance of timber a dairying industry was established. The first Malanda Show was held in 1916.

European settlers took up land at Millaa Millaa from 1910, and established dairy farms from 1916.

== Intersecting state-controlled roads ==
The following state-controlled roads intersect with this road:

- Malanda–Upper Barron Road
- Malanda–Lake Barrine Road
- East Evelyn Road
- Beatrice Way

=== Malanda–Upper Barron Road ===
Malanda–Upper Barron Road
- Location: Malanda–Atherton Road, Malanda to Kennedy Highway, Upper Barron
- Length: 13.5 km (8.4 mi)

Malanda–Upper Barron Road is a state-controlled district road (number 646), rated as a local road of regional significance (LRRS). It runs from Malanda–Atherton Road in Malanda to the Kennedy Highway in Upper Barron, a distance of 13.5 kilometres (8.4 mi). This road has no major intersections.

=== Malanda–Lake Barrine Road ===
Malanda–Lake Barrine Road
- Location: Malanda–Atherton Road and Millaa Millaa–Malanda Road, Malanda to Gillies Range Road, Yungaburra
- Length: 12.1 km (7.5 mi)

Malanda–Lake Barrine Road is a state-controlled district road (number 643), rated as a local road of regional significance (LRRS). It runs from the intersection of Malanda–Atherton Road and Millaa Millaa–Malanda Road in Malanda to Gillies Range Road in Yungaburra, a distance of 12.1 kilometres (7.5 mi). This road has no major intersections.

=== East Evelyn Road ===
East Evelyn Road
- Location: Millaa Millaa–Malanda Road, Millaa Millaa to Kennedy Highway, Evelyn
- Length: 10.7 km (6.6 mi)
- Route number: 24

East Evelyn Road is a state-controlled regional road (number 6404). It is signed as State Route 24. It runs from Millaa Millaa–Malanda Road in Millaa Millaa to the Kennedy Highway in Evelyn, a distance of 10.7 kilometres (6.6 mi). This road has no major intersections.

=== Beatrice Way ===
Beatrice Way
- Location: Millaa Millaa–Malanda Road and Palmerston Highway, Millaa Millaa to Kennedy Highway, Ravenshoe
- Length: 23.8 km (14.8 mi)

Beatrice Way is a state-controlled district road (number 6701), rated as a local road of regional significance (LRRS). It runs from the intersection of Millaa Millaa-Malanda Road and Palmerston Highway in Millaa Millaa to the Kennedy Highway in Ravenshoe, a distance of 23.8 kilometres (14.8 mi). This road has no major intersections.

== Major intersections ==
All distances are from Google Maps. The entire road is within the Tablelands local government area.

Location	km	mi	Destinations	Notes
Atherton	0	0.0	Kennedy Highway – north – Atherton, Tolga, Mareeba – south – Evelyn, Ravenshoe	Northern end of Malanda–Atherton Road. Road continues east as State Route 25.
Malanda	14.0	8.7	Malanda–Upper Barron Road – southwest – Upper Barron, Kennedy Highway	Road continues southeast.
Malanda	16.3	10.1	Malanda–Lake Barrine Road – east, then northeast and north – Yungaburra, Gillies Range Road	Road continues south as Millaa Millaa–Malanda Road.
Millaa Millaa	35.7	22.2	East Evelyn Road – southwest – Evelyn, Kennedy Highway	Road continues southeast.
Millaa Millaa	39.0	24.2	Beatrice Way – southwest – Beatrice, Ravenshoe, Kennedy Highway – Main Street – northeast – Millaa Millaa	Southern end of Millaa Millaa–Malanda Road. State Route 25 continues northeast as Palmerston Highway.
1.000 mi = 1.609 km; 1.000 km = 0.621 mi: Route transition

== See also ==
- List of numbered roads in Queensland
