= Beatrice, Queensland =

Beatrice
- Suburb
- Interactive map of Beatrice
- Coordinates: 17.5622°S 145.5844°E
- Country: Australia
- State: Queensland
- LGA: Tablelands Region
- Location: 28.2 km (17.5 mi) S of Malanda; 46.9 km (29.1 mi) SSE of Atherton; 63.4 km (39.4 mi) W of Innisfail; 103 km (64 mi) SW of Cairns; 1,674 km (1,040 mi) NNW of Brisbane

Government
  - State electorate: Hill
  - Federal division: Kennedy

Area
  - Total: 48.2 km^{2} (18.6 sq mi)

Population
  - Total: 126 (2021 census)
  - Density: 2.614/km^{2} (6.77/sq mi)
- Time zone: UTC+10:00 (AEST)
- Postcode: 4886
Suburbs around Beatrice
Evelyn	Millaa Millaa	Millaa Millaa
Evelyn	Beatrice	Middlebrook
Ravenshoe	Ravenshoe	Maalan

Beatrice is a rural locality in the Tablelands Region, Queensland, Australia. In the 2021 census, Beatrice had a population of 126 people.

== Geography ==
The road Beatrice Way enters from the south (Ravenshoe) and then forms part of the southern and eastern boundaries of the locality, then heads north through the locality, before exiting to Millaa Millaa.

Mount Fisher is a mountain in the far west of the locality (17.5563°S 145.5464°E), rising to 1,385 metres (4,544 ft) above sea level.

Beatrice River rises to the south-west of Mount Fisher and exits to the east of the locality (Middlebrook). It ultimately becomes a tributary of the Johnstone River in Wooroonooran.

Waribinda Falls is a waterfall (17.555°S 145.5694°E) on an unnamed creek to the east of Mount Fisher. It is believed to be an Indigenous name where Wari refers to the Wari people who once lived in that area and Binda means waterfall.

The west of the locality is within Maalan National Park. Apart from this protected area, the land use is predominantly grazing on native vegetation.

== History ==
The locality presumably takes its name from the Beatrice River which flows through the locality which in turn was named in November 1882 by explorer and prospector Christie Palmerston after a Melbourne friend.

Approval was given to erect a school at Beatrice River in March 1921. Beatrice River State School opened on 14 November 1921. It closed in 1946. It was at 73 Pheasant Road (17.54276°S 145.60641°E).

== Demographics ==
In the 2016 census, Beatrice had a population of 99 people.

In the 2021 census, Beatrice had a population of 126 people.

== Education ==
There are no schools in Beatrice. The nearest government primary schools are Millaa Millaa State School in neighbouring Millaa Millaa to the north and Ravenshoe State School in neighbouring Ravenshoe to the south-west. The nearest government secondary schools are Ravenshoe State School (to Year 12) in Ravenshoe and Malanda State High School (to Year 12) in Malanda to the north.
