= Tarzali =

- Town
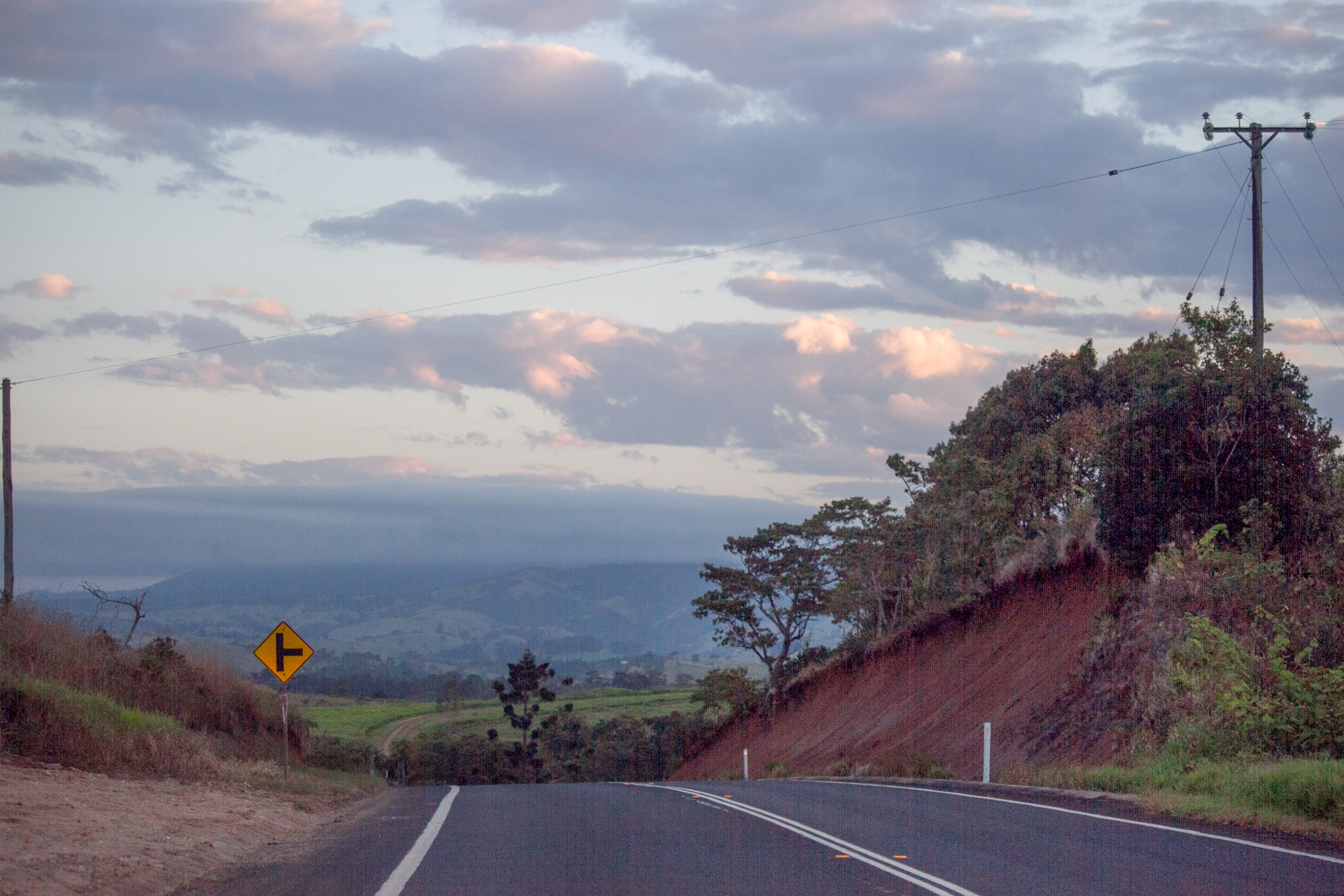
- Looking south along Malanda Millaa Milla Road south of the town of Tarzali, 2013

- Interactive map of Tarzali
- Coordinates: 17.4252°S 145.6036°E
- Country: Australia
- State: Queensland
- LGA: Tablelands Region
- Location: 9.7 km (6.0 mi) S of Malanda; 28.5 km (17.7 mi) SE of Atherton; 84.3 km (52.4 mi) SSE of Cairns; 1,671 km (1,038 mi) NNW of Brisbane

Government
  - State electorate: Hill
  - Federal division: Kennedy

Area
  - Total: 77.3 km^{2} (29.8 sq mi)

Population
  - Total: 431 (2021 census)
  - Density: 5.576/km^{2} (14.441/sq mi)
- Time zone: UTC+10:00 (AEST)
- Postcode: 4885
Localities around Tarzali
Upper Barron	Jaggan	Glen Allyn
Upper Barron	Tarzali	Wooroonooran
Minbun	Moregatta	Millaa Millaa

Tarzali is a rural town and locality in the Tablelands Region, Queensland, Australia. In the 2021 census, the locality of Tarzali had a population of 431 people.

== Geography ==
The locality is on the Atherton Tableland. It is bounded to the east by the Johnstone River, to the south-east and south by Dirran Creek, and to the north-west by Seamark Road. The town is located in the centre of the locality. The Millaa Millaa–Malanda Road enters the locality from the north (Jaggan), passes through the town, and exits to the south-west (Minbun).

The terrain is elevated and hilly with one named peak, Bartletts Hill (17.4300°S 145.6155°E) which rises to 837 metres (2,746 ft) above sea level.

The land use around the town centre is residential. In the rest of the locality, the predominant land use is grazing on native vegetation.

== History ==
The town takes its name from the Tarzali railway station on the Millaa Milla branch of the Tablelands railway line. The name Tarzali is said to be an Aboriginal word meaning water gum, Syzygium gustavioides. The railway station was in use from 1915 to 1964.

The Millaa Millaa branch railway line from Tolga opened to Tarzali on 15 December 1916 with the town being served by Tarzali railway station (17.4264°S 145.6044°E). The line was opened through to Millaa Millaa on 19 December 1921. The line has now closed and the Tarzali railway station has been dismantled.

In April 1914, a tent school was approved for Dirran (the name of the parish) on the land of Mr William's selection until a state school could be constructed. Dirran State School opened on 3 May 1915. On 21 October 1918, it was renamed Tarzali State School. It closed on 31 December 1967. The school was at Millaa Millaa Malanda Road (17.4280°S 145.6032°E).

== Demographics ==
In the 2016 census, the locality of Tarzali had a population of 398 people.

In the 2021 census, the locality of Tarzali had a population of 431 people.

== Education ==
There are no schools in Tarzali. The nearest government primary schools are Malanda State School in Malanda to the north and Millaa Millaa State School in neighbouring Millaa Millaa to the south. The nearest government secondary school is Malanda State High School in Malanda to the north.
