= Mungalli =

- Suburb
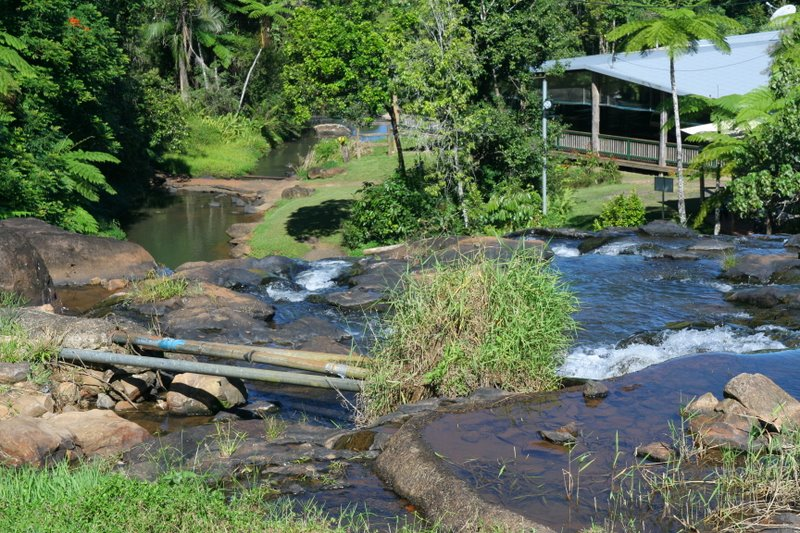
- Mungalli Falls, 2008

- Interactive map of Mungalli
- Coordinates: 17.5455°S 145.6883°E
- Country: Australia
- State: Queensland
- LGA: Tablelands Region
- Location: 12.0 km (7.5 mi) SE of Millaa Millaa; 35.6 km (22.1 mi) SSE of Malanda; 54.6 km (33.9 mi) SE of Atherton; 131 km (81 mi) SSW of Cairns; 1,660 km (1,030 mi) NNW of Brisbane

Government
  - State electorate: Hill
  - Federal division: Kennedy

Area
  - Total: 18.8 km^{2} (7.3 sq mi)

Population
  - Total: 40 (2021 census)
  - Density: 2.13/km^{2} (5.5/sq mi)
- Time zone: UTC+10:00 (AEST)
- Postcode: 4886
Suburbs around Mungalli
Millaa Millaa	Ellinjaa	Wooroonooran
Middlebrook	Mungalli	Wooroonooran
Middlebrook	Wooroonooran	Wooroonooran

Mungalli is a rural locality in the Tablelands Region, Queensland, Australia. In the 2021 census, Mungalli had a population of 40 people.

== Geography ==
The Beatrice River forms the south-eastern boundary of the locality.

Campbells Hill is in the west of the locality (17.5465°S 145.6669°E), rising to 790 metres (2,590 ft) above sea level.

The Palmerston Highway enters the locality from the south (Wooroonooran) and exits to the north-west (Millaa Millaa / Ellinjaa).

The land use is predominantly grazing on a mixture of native vegetation and planted pastures. Much of the land is undeveloped bushland.

== History ==
Brook's Road State School opened circa 1927 and closed in 1954. It was at 12 Campbell Road (corner of Brooks Road, 17.5359°S 145.6725°E).

== Demographics ==
In the 2016 census, Mungalli had a population of 44 people.

In the 2021 census, Mungalli had a population of 40 people.

== Education ==
There are no schools in Mungalli. The nearest government primary school is Millaa Millaa State School in neighbouring Millaa Millaa to the west. The nearest government secondary school is Malanda State High School in Malanda to the north-west. There is a Catholic primary school in Ravenshoe.

== Economy ==
Established in 2000, Mungalli Creek Dairy is an organic dairy farm and one of only two certified biodynamic dairy farms in Australia. In 2021, it opened an expanded milk processing facility with the assistance of Queensland Government funding. It is at 254 Brooks Road (17.54154°S 145.68708°E). Visitors are welcome and there is a cafe in the former farmhouse.

== Attractions ==
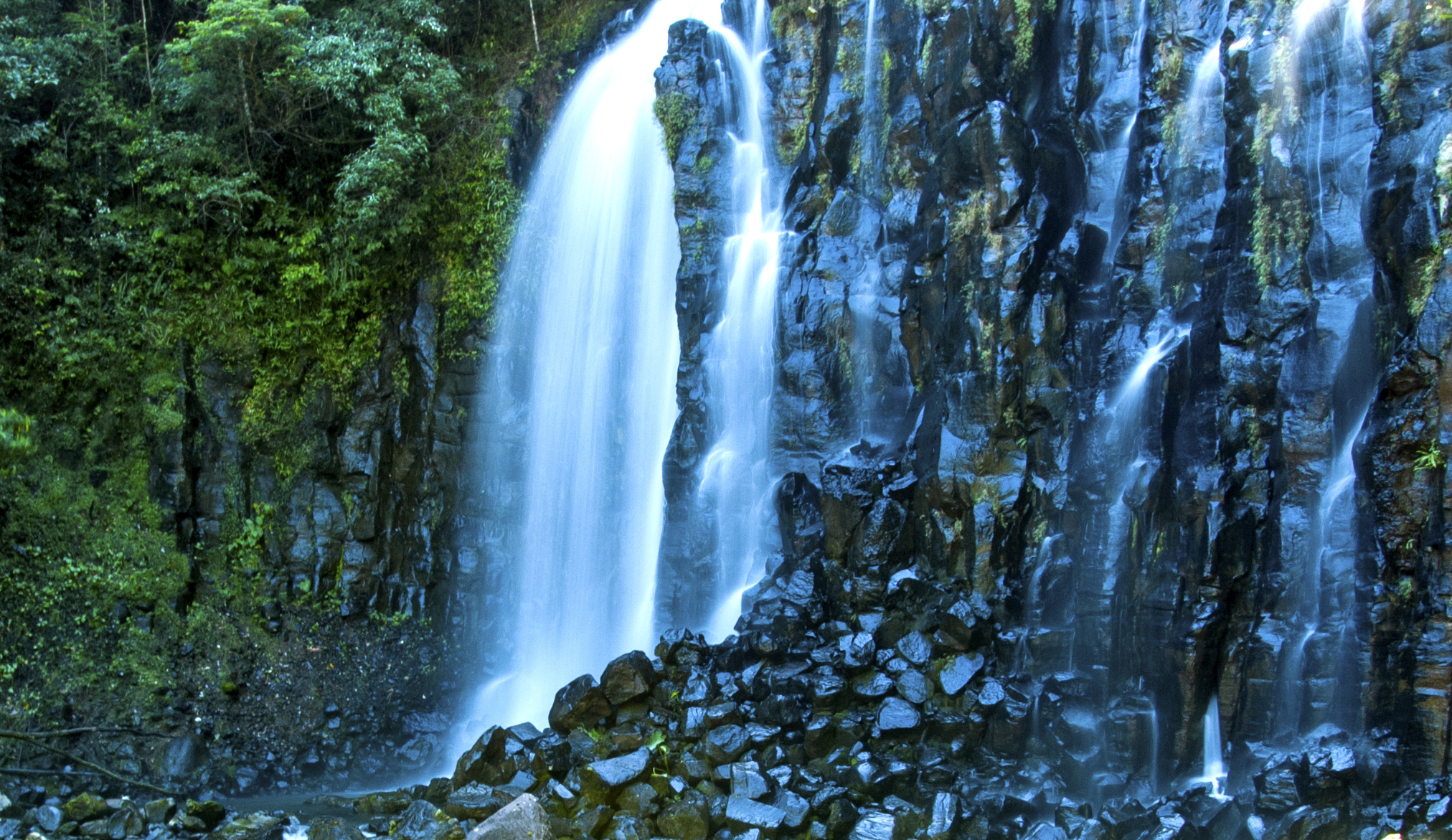
Mungalli Falls, 2014

Mungalli Falls is a waterfall in the south-east of the locality at 296 Junction Road (17.55085°S 145.69790°E). There is a platypus viewing area near the falls.
