= Ellinjaa, Queensland =

Ellinjaa
- Suburb
- Interactive map of Ellinjaa
- Coordinates: 17.5077°S 145.6616°E
- Country: Australia
- State: Queensland
- LGA: Tablelands Region
- Location: 5.7 km (3.5 mi) E of Millaa Millaa; 28.4 km (17.6 mi) S of Malanda; 46.7 km (29.0 mi) SSR of Atherton; 103 km (64 mi) SSW of Cairns; 1,643 km (1,021 mi) SSW of Brisbane

Government
  - State electorate: Hill
  - Federal division: Kennedy

Area
  - Total: 24.7 km^{2} (9.5 sq mi)

Population
  - Total: 66 (2021 census)
  - Density: 2.672/km^{2} (6.92/sq mi)
- Time zone: UTC+10:00 (AEST)
- Postcode: 4886
Suburbs around Ellinjaa
Millaa Millaa	Millaa Millaa	Wooroonooran
Millaa Millaa	Ellinjaa	Wooroonooran
Millaa Millaa	Mungalli	Wooroonooran

Ellinjaa is a rural locality in the Tablelands Region, Queensland, Australia. In the 2021 census, Ellinjaa had a population of 66 people.

== Geography ==
The land use is almost entirely grazing, on a mixture of native vegetation and modified pastures.

== History ==
The name of the locality probably derives from nearby Ellinjaa Creek and Ellinjaa Falls.

Brook's Road State School opened circa 1927 and closed in 1954. It was on the east side of the Palmerston Highway at approx 17.5371°S 145.6655°E.

== Demographics ==
In the 2016 census, Ellinjaa had a population of 31 people.

In the 2021 census, Ellinjaa had a population of 66 people.

== Education ==
There are no schools in Ellinjaa. The nearest government primary school is Millaa Millaa State School in neighbouring Millaa Millaa to the west. The nearest government secondary school is Malanda State High School in Malanda to the north.
