= East Barron, Queensland =

East Barron
- Suburb
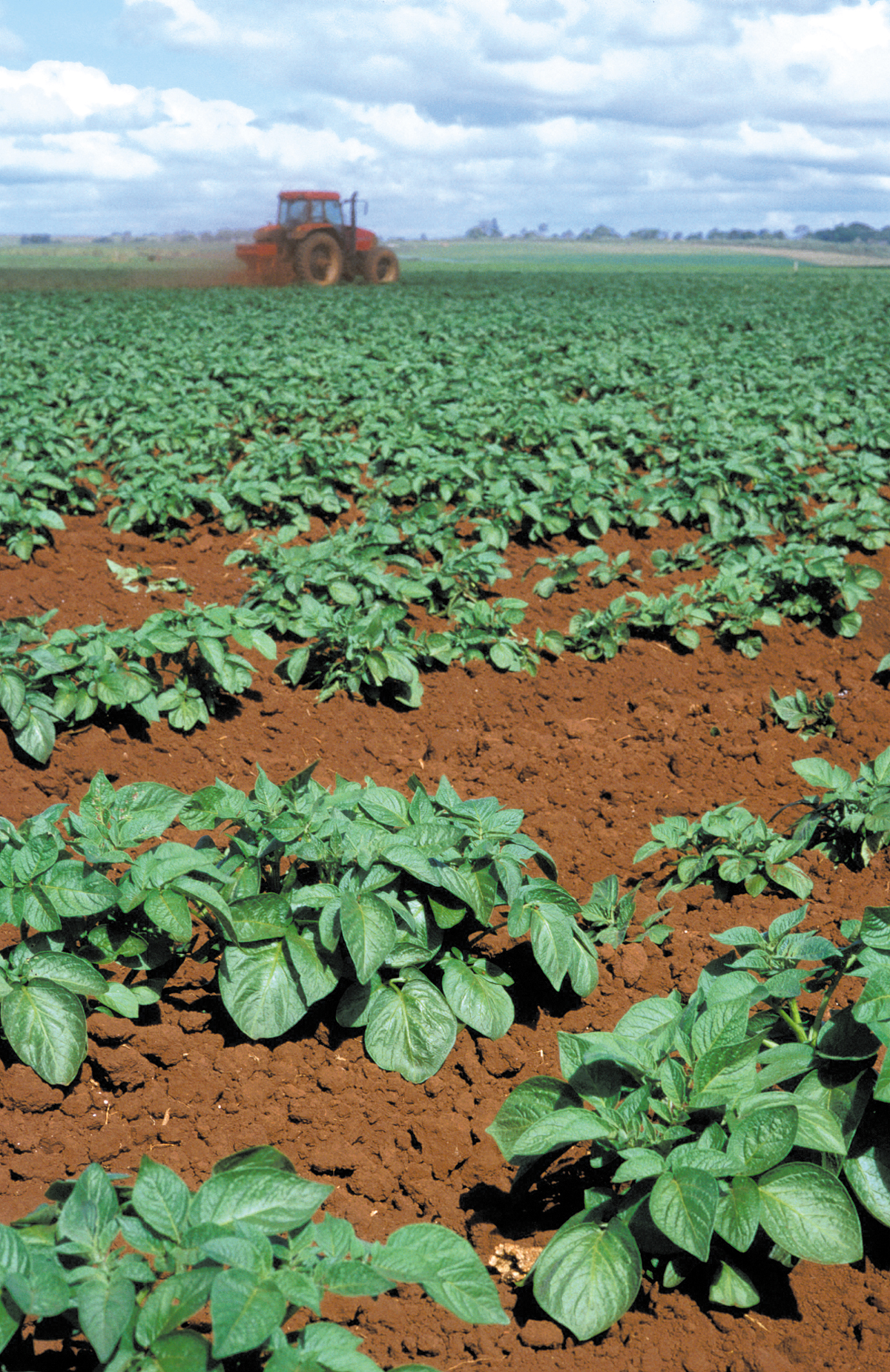
- Potato crop, East Barron area, 1998

- Interactive map of East Barron
- Coordinates: 17.3019°S 145.5441°E
- Country: Australia
- State: Queensland
- LGA: Tablelands Region
- Location: 4.2 km (2.6 mi) W of Yungaburra; 9.2 km (5.7 mi) E of Atherton; 70.7 km (43.9 mi) SW of Cairns; 1,703 km (1,058 mi) NNW of Brisbane

Government
  - State electorate: Hill
  - Federal division: Kennedy

Area
  - Total: 40.0 km^{2} (15.4 sq mi)

Population
  - Total: 278 (2021 census)
  - Density: 6.950/km^{2} (18.00/sq mi)
- Time zone: UTC+10:00 (AEST)
- Postcode: 4883
Suburbs around East Barron
Kairi	Lake Tinaroo	Yungaburra
Atherton	East Barron	Peeramon
Wongabel	Upper Barron	Upper Barron

East Barron is a rural locality in the Tablelands Region, Queensland, Australia. In the 2021 census, East Barron had a population of 278 people.

== Geography ==
The Barron River forms most of the western boundary of the locality flowing into Lake Tinaroo (created by the Tinaroo Dam) which then forms the northern boundary of the locality. Peterson Creek, also flowing into Lake Tinaroo, forms the north-east boundary of the locality, while Gwynne Creek forms the south-western boundary of the locality, before crossing the locality to become a tributary of the Barron River.

The elevation ranges from 680 metres (2,230 ft) in the north of the locality near Lake Tinaroo to 800 metres (2,600 ft) in the south of the locality. There is small chain of hills known as The Pinnacles in the north of the locality with heights up to 790 to 810 metres (2,590 to 2,660 ft).

The Curtin Fig National Park and (despite the name) the Yungaburra National Park are in the east of the locality. Apart from these protected areas, the land is used for grazing on native vegetation and growing a variety of crops including sugarcane.

In the north of the locality, the Gilles Range Road enters the locality from the north-east (Yungaburra) and exits to the west (Atherton). Further south, the Malanda–Atherton Road enters the locality from the south-east (Upper Barron) and exits to the west (Atherton).

== History ==
East Barron State School opened on 28 April 1915 and closed in 1964. It was at 331 East Barron Road (17.32364°S 145.53029°E).

== Demographics ==
In the 2016 census, East Barron had a population of 234 people.

In the 2021 census, East Barron had a population of 278 people.

== Heritage listings ==
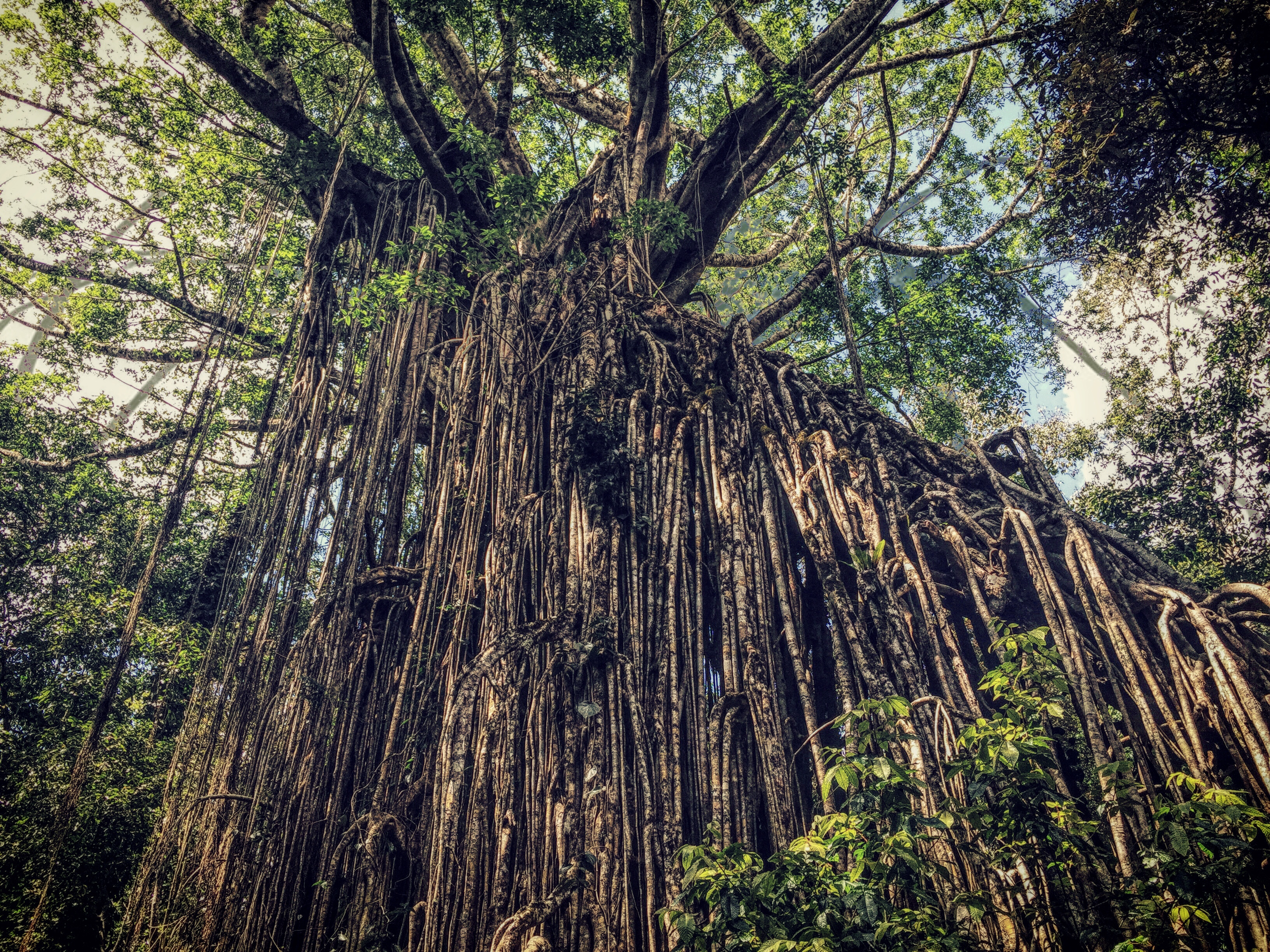
Curtain fig tree, 2015

East Barron has a number of heritage-listed sites, including:

- Curtain Fig Tree, Curtain Fig Tree Road

== Education ==
There are no schools in East Barron. The nearest government primary schools are Yungaburra State School in neighbouring Yungaburra to the east and Malanda State School in Malanda to the south-east. The nearest government secondary schools are Atherton State High School in Atherton to the west and Malanda State High School in Malanda to the south-east.

== Attractions ==
The Curtain Fig Tree is a very large example of a strangler fig and is estimated to be over 500 years old (17.2858°S 145.5735°E).
