= Cressbrook Cemetery =

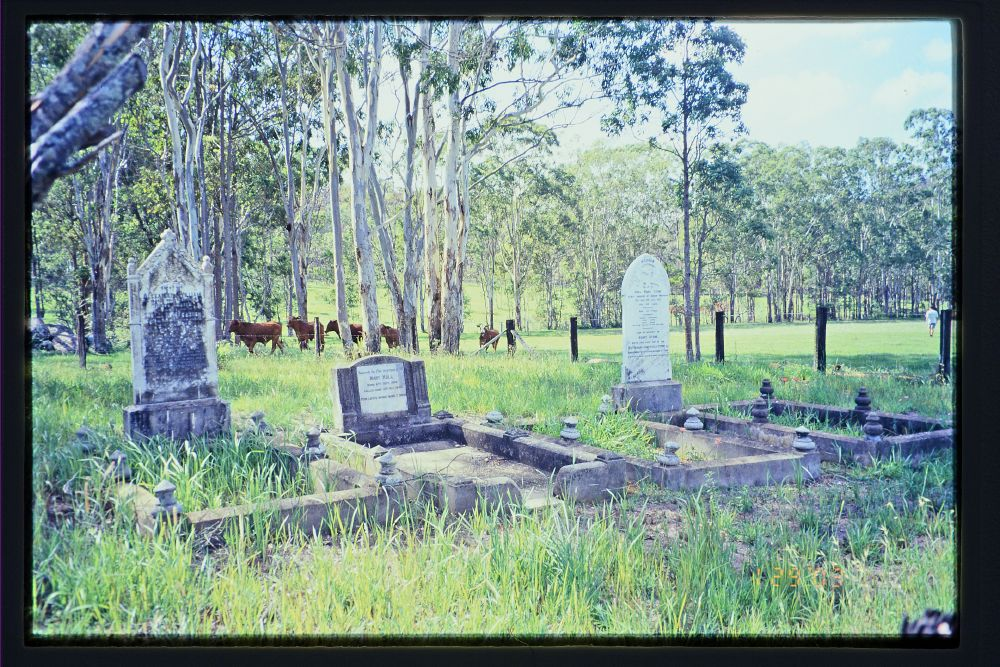
- Cressbrook Cemetery, 2003

- Location within Queensland Location within Australia
- 17.4997°S 145.4501°E
- Location: off Jonsson Road, Evelyn, Tablelands Region, Queensland, Australia

History
- Design period: 1900–1914 (early 20th century)
- Built: 1913–1940

Site notes
- Architect: Melrose & Fenwick

Queensland Heritage Register
- Official name: Cressbrook Cemetery, Cressbrook Cemetery-Evelyn
- Type: state heritage (built)
- Designated: 17 June 2003
- Reference no.: 601900
- Significant period: 1913–1940 (fabric); 1913–1992 (historical use of cemetery)
- Significant components: fence/wall – perimeter, burial/grave, headstone, trees/plantings

Cressbrook Cemetery is a heritage-listed cemetery off Jonsson Road, Evelyn, Tablelands Region, Queensland, Australia. It was designed by Melrose & Fenwick and built from 1913 to 1940. It is also known as Cressbrook Cemetery-Evelyn. It was added to the Queensland Heritage Register on 17 June 2003.

== Heritage listing ==
Cressbrook Cemetery was listed on the Queensland Heritage Register on 17 June 2003 having satisfied the following criteria.

The place is important in demonstrating the evolution or pattern of Queensland's history.

Cressbrook Cemetery is a small private cemetery containing the headstones of four early Herbert River settlers. It is important in demonstrating the evolution or pattern of Queensland's history, in particular the development and decline of rural properties.

The place is important in demonstrating the principal characteristics of a particular class of cultural places.

The cemetery demonstrates the principal characteristics of rural homestead cemeteries, where members of extended families were buried in small private cemeteries on the property. Two of the graves in the Cressbrook Cemetery are marked with typically elaborate marble headstones, made by stonemasons in regional centres, and imported into the district.

The place has a special association with the life or work of a particular person, group or organisation of importance in Queensland's history.

The place has a special association with Queensland's history because it is the burial place of important pioneers of North Queensland. Explorer and pioneer Henry Stone surveyed blocks on the headwaters of the Burdekin River in 1859. He was the first manager of the Valley of Lagoons and first settler of the Upper Herbert, establishing the Vale of Herbert Station in 1865. Anna Stone and Mary Hull were also important early pioneers of the Upper and Lower Herbert districts, arriving as children at the Valley of Lagoons in 1868.
