= Millaa Millaa Falls =

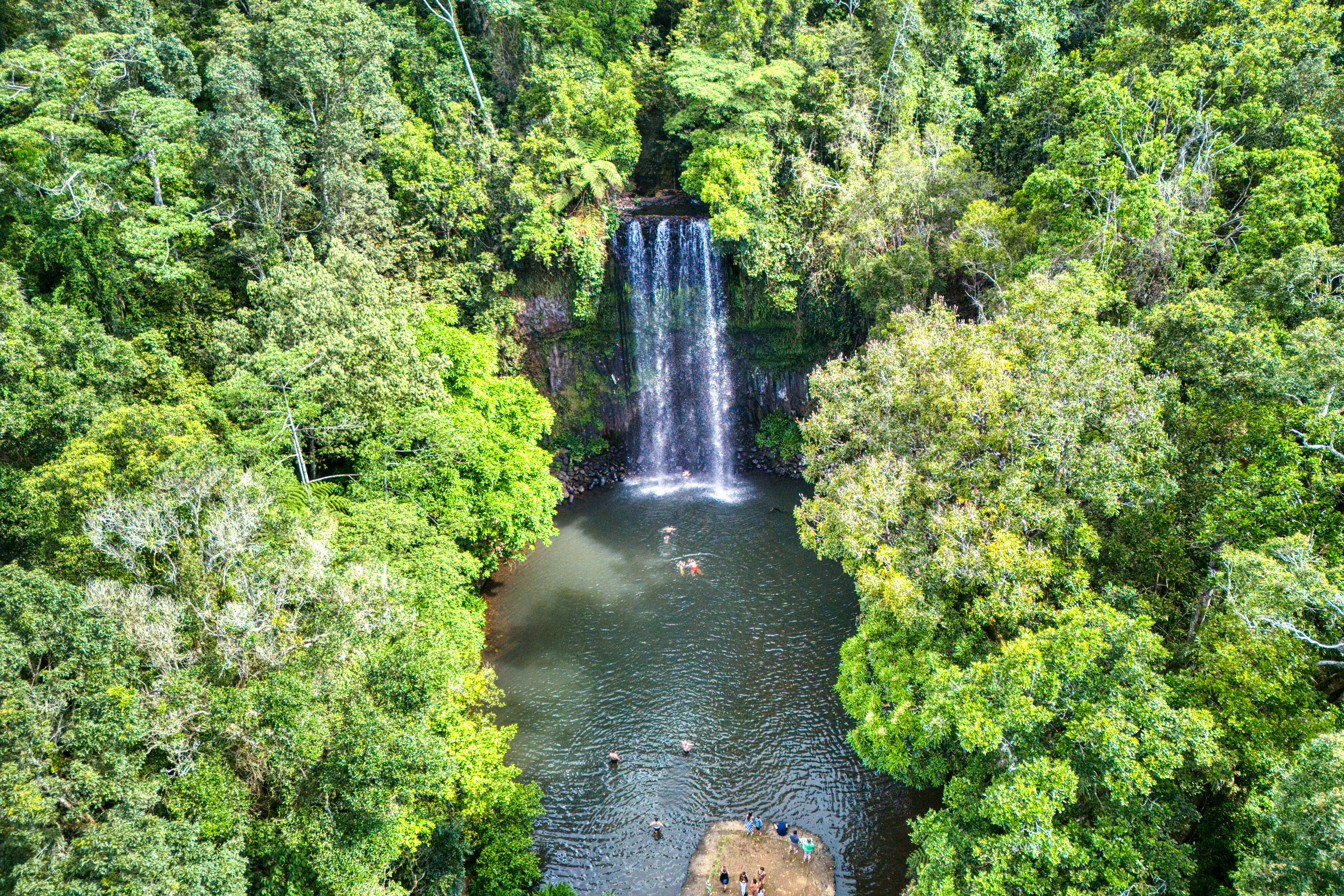
- Millaa Millaa Falls in October 2023

- Location within Queensland
- Location: Far North Queensland, Australia
- Coordinates: 17°29′44″S 145°36′36″E
- Type: Plunge
- Total height: 18.3 metres (60 ft)
- Number of drops: 1
- Watercourse: Theresa Creek

Millaa Millaa Falls
- Location within Queensland
- 17.4963°S 145.6106°E
- Location: Theresa Creek Road, Millaa Millaa, Tablelands Region, Queensland, Australia

Queensland Heritage Register
- Official name: Millaa Millaa Falls
- Type: state heritage (landscape, built)
- Designated: 5 December 2005
- Reference no.: 602449
- Significant period: 1950s (fabric); 1880s, 1909, 1920s (historical) & 1950s onwards (social)
- Significant components: toilet block/earth closet/water closet, memorial – rock/stone/boulder, quarry, waterfall / water feature

Millaa Millaa Falls is a heritage-listed plunge waterfall at Theresa Creek Road, Millaa Millaa, Tablelands Region, Queensland, Australia. It was added to the Queensland Heritage Register on 5 December 2005.

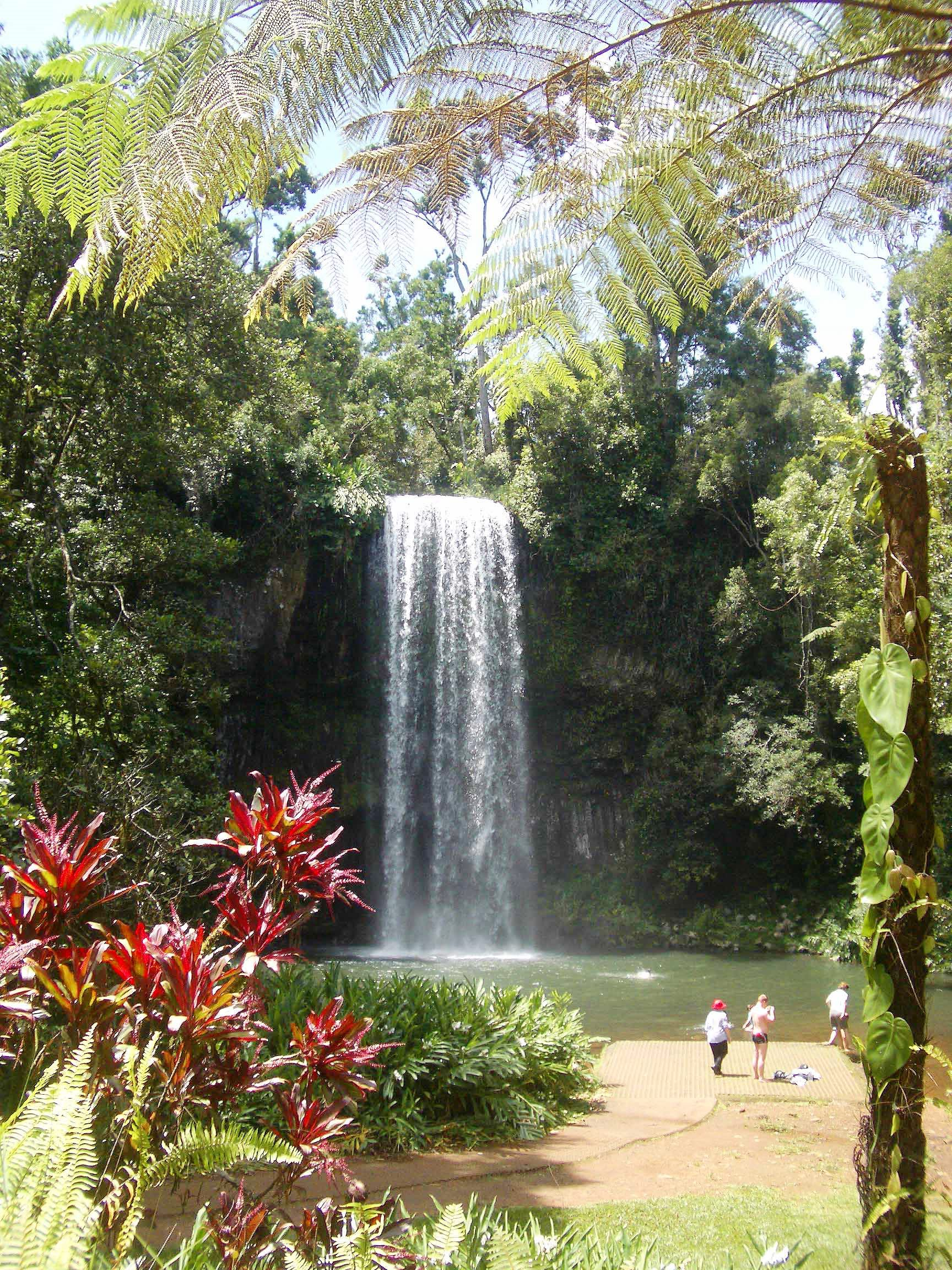
Milla Milla Falls

The falls are adjacent to the town of Millaa Millaa on the Atherton Tableland. 'Millaa Millaa' is a MaMu Aboriginal phrase referring to the rainforest vine Elaeagnus Triflora whose fruit appears from May to February. A popular destination of international tour operators, the falls are 18.3 metres (60 ft) high with a pool suitable for swimming at their base. The Millaa Millaa Falls are accessed by sealed road off the Palmerston Highway about 5 minutes from the township of Millaa Millaa.

== History ==
The Millaa Millaa Falls were discovered by Europeans during exploration of overland routes to connect the Herberton mining fields with Queensland coastal ports. The falls are named after the nearby township of Millaa Millaa. The name "Millaa Millaa" is derived from a phonetic adaptation of the Aboriginal word "Malay Malay", which in the language of the local Mamu Aboriginal people refers to the rainforest vine (Elaeagnus triflora), which fruit was a seasonal food source. This plant occurs throughout the surrounding area and is commonly known as the Millaa Millaa Vine. This is contrary to the popular belief that the name Millaa Millaa means either "water fall", "many waterfalls" or "plenty water", but does demonstrate how important the falls are in the regional psyche.

In 1882 tracks were blazed through the rainforest close to the falls by both Sub Inspector Alexander Douglas (May 1882) and Christie Palmerston (October to December 1882). Palmerston also mapped an improved track through the area during 1884–1885, which subsequently became known as the Palmerston track. The popular belief that Palmerston camped at and named Millaa Millaa falls, which is in part commemorated by a monument at the site, cannot be substantiated from the historical record.

A clearing at the Millaa Millaa Falls was used as a rest stop for the early horse and mule pack teams that traversed the Palmerston track when travelling to and from the Herberton mining field. This clearing was also used as a base for land surveyors working in the area in 1909 and as a camp for workers constructing the railway line between Malanda and the Millaa Millaa township in the 1920s.

Also during the 1920s a quarry was established next to the Millaa Millaa Falls to supply a nearby crushing plant with stone, which was used to produce road-making materials. Blasting and excavation work at the quarry threatened to damage or destroy the falls, but due to the efforts of the Millaa Millaa Progress Association it was protected, and by the mid-1920s had become a popular stop for tours of the Atherton Tablelands. Conversely, the quarry, which was abandoned in 1927, was also partly responsible for the latter popularity and preservation of the falls because of the access that it provided to the site.

In the late 1950s access to a popular swimming hole known as "Rawson's Pool" which was located on private property downstream from the falls was stopped and the focus then shifted to Millaa Millaa Falls. The access road to the quarry was upgraded and extended down to near the base of the falls and a small car park constructed. Also at this time, public facilities were added to the site including toilets, shelter shed, and barbeques. Further safety and interpretive improvements were carried out in 2002. In 2003, the quarry was converted into a car park and a walking track and steps created which lead down to the falls viewing area. In 2005 a biological toilet facility, shelter shed and interpretive bus shelters were built. Millaa Millaa Falls is now part of what is known within the tourism industry as the "waterfall circuit" near Millaa Millaa township, which also includes the Zillie and Elinjaa Falls.

The Millaa Millaa Falls is an icon within the tourism industry, not only within North Queensland but also nationally and internationally. A 2008 search of the internet revealed at least 917 tour sites advertising the falls, with 276 containing photographs. The falls has also featured in numerous movies, documentaries and television commercials; advertising everything from Indian lotto to Swedish Timotei shampoo. The place is also used for a range of community events.

== Description ==
The Millaa Millaa Falls are approximately 18.3 metres (60 ft) in height and are formed from volcanic basalt which has weathered to create distinctive vertical striations (pipe formations) in the surface of the rock and which gives the falls its pleasing textural backdrop. There is a large pool below the falls that is surrounded by rainforest, except for a grassed viewing area facing the falls and a concrete block pad on the waters edge.

A set of concrete steps leads from the lower bus park down to the viewing area. The bus park is separated from the viewing area by a low post and rail fence. A c. 1950 timber-framed weatherboard toilet block is located on the north-eastern side of the falls and remains in use. A biological toilet facility has been constructed on the northern side of the bus park (2005). A shelter shed and interpretive bus shelters have also been erected on the north-western end of the bus park (2005). A track with steps runs from the 1950s toilet block and terminates at the upper car park.

There is a stone monument on the fence line, erected in 1982, at the western end of the lower bus park with a bronze plaque attached that commemorates the explorer Christie Palmerston.

The Millaa Millaa Scenic Reserve also may contain other sites of heritage significance that have not been formally identified at this time. These include the original clearing near the falls and its associated campsite; railway objects located near the western boundary of the reserve adjacent to the Irwin Track; and blazed trees associated with survey and logging tracks within the reserve.

== Cultural references ==
Video filmed here include:

- XXXX Gold Beer advert "Jacko's Retreat"
- Herbal Essence commercial "Rainforest – Waterfall" for its Rainforest Deep Nourishment and Shine shampoo product

== Heritage listing ==
Millaa Millaa Falls was listed on the Queensland Heritage Register on 5 December 2005 having satisfied the following criteria.

The place is important in demonstrating the evolution or pattern of Queensland's history.

Millaa Millaa Falls is important in demonstrating the evolution or pattern of Queensland's history due to its close association with the tracks, surveying, railways, roads and tourism, which aided the development and settlement of the Atherton Tableland region. At various times the immediate area around the falls was used as a rest stop for the early horse and mule pack teams that travelled along the Palmerston track on their way to and from the Herberton mining field; used as a depot for the first land surveyors working in the area; a camp for workers on the Millaa Millaa railway, and as a quarry for road materials.

The place is important because of its aesthetic significance.

Millaa Millaa Falls is also a place of importance because of its aesthetic significance, which lies in both its natural beauty and picturesque qualities, and because of its iconic representation, both nationally and internationally. Images of the falls are one of the most recognised natural features from the Atherton Tablelands and are used by local council and Australian tourism operators to promote the region. The natural and visual integrity of the falls has changed little over time, which is evidenced by the numerous historical images, although the site access, public facilities, and viewing environs have been modified.

The place has a strong or special association with a particular community or cultural group for social, cultural or spiritual reasons.

Because of Millaa Millaa Falls importance to the far north Queensland tourism industry and its historical utilization as a picnic and swimming venue, it has since the 1950s developed a strong social and cultural association with people of the region. Millaa Millaa Falls is also culturally important to the regional Mamu Aboriginal people, as it was a seasonal food source and camping area at the time of first European settlement of the area. The falls were also the first natural landmark to be associated with the area, even before the establishment of the Millaa Millaa Township.

== See also ==
- List of waterfalls
- List of waterfalls in Australia
