= Palmerston, Queensland =

Palmerston
- Suburb
- Interactive map of Palmerston
- Coordinates: 17.6097°S 145.7494°E
- Country: Australia
- State: Queensland
- LGAs: Tablelands Region; Cassowary Coast Region
- Location: 55.0 km (34.2 mi) SsE of Atherton; 74.1 km (46.0 mi) W of Innisfail; 110 km (68 mi) SSW of Cairns; 1,792 km (1,113 mi) NNW of Brisbane

Government
  - State electorate: Hill
  - Federal division: Kennedy

Area
  - Total: 94.8 km^{2} (36.6 sq mi)

Population
  - Total: 0 (2021 census)
  - Density: 0.000/km^{2} (0.000/sq mi)
- Time zone: UTC+10:00 (AEST)
- Postcode: 4860
Suburbs around Palmerston
Middlebrook	Wooroonooran	Wooroonooran
Maalan	Palmerston	East Palmerston
Koombooloomba	Gulngai	Mamu

Palmerston is a rural locality split between the Tablelands Region and the Cassowary Coast Region, Queensland, Australia. In the 2021 census, Palmerston had "no people or a very low population".

== Geography ==
Mount Father Clancy is in the north-west of the locality (17.5878°S 145.6343°E) rising to 1,087 metres (3,566 ft) above sea level.

The locality is entirely within the Wooroonooran National Park, part of the Wet Tropics World Heritage Area .

The South Johnstone River rises in the west of the locality, flows south-west, where it forms part of the southern boundary of the locality and then exits to the south-east (Gulngai).

== History ==
The locality is believed to be named after explorer Christie Palmerston.

== Demographics ==
In the 2016 census, Palmerston had "no people or a very low population".

In the 2021 census, Palmerston had "no people or a very low population".

== Attractions ==
The Palmerston section of the national park is known for its dense rainforest with over 500 species of trees with opportunities to see many animals including brightly coloured butterflies. The park offers a number of facilities for visitors including camping grounds, tracks for walking and cycling, swimming holes, and picnic areas.
