= Jaggan, Queensland =

Jaggan
- Town
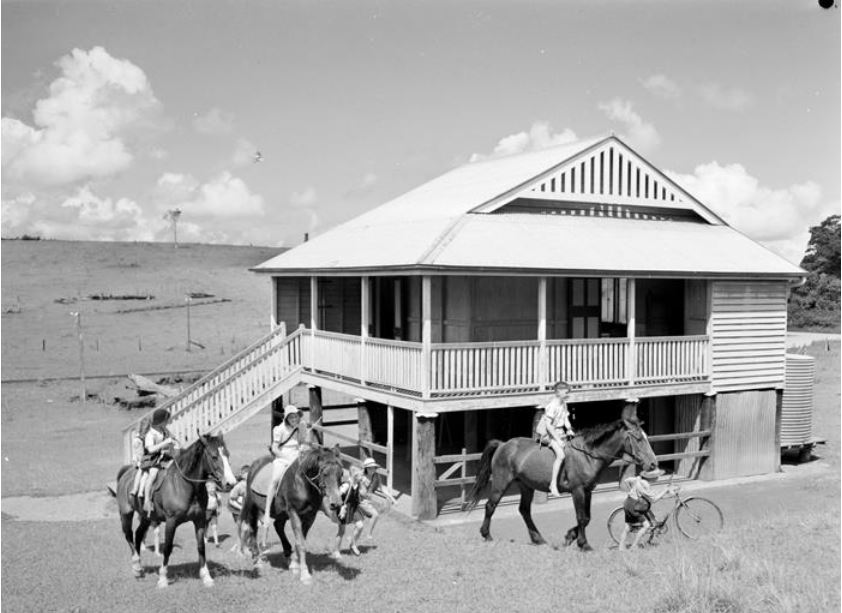
- Jaggan State School, 1947

- Interactive map of Jaggan
- Coordinates: 17.3941°S 145.5991°E
- Country: Australia
- State: Queensland
- LGA: Tablelands Region
- Location: 6.3 km (3.9 mi) S of Malanda; 25.2 km (15.7 mi) SE of Atherton; 80.5 km (50.0 mi) SW of Cairns; 1,684 km (1,046 mi) NNW of Brisbane

Government
  - State electorate: Hill
  - Federal division: Kennedy

Area
  - Total: 32.2 km^{2} (12.4 sq mi)

Population
  - Total: 217 (2021 census)
  - Density: 6.739/km^{2} (17.45/sq mi)
- Time zone: UTC+10:00 (AEST)
- Postcode: 4885
Localities around Jaggan
Upper Barron	Malanda	Glen Allyn
Upper Barron	Jaggan	Glen Allyn
Tarzali	Tarzali	Glen Allyn

Jaggan is a rural town and locality in the Tablelands Region, Queensland, Australia. In the 2021 census, the locality of Jaggan had a population of 217 people.

== Geography ==
The town of Jaggan is located on the north-western boundary of the locality.

The Millaa Millaa–Malanda Road enters the locality from the north (Malanda), passes immediately north and west of the town of Jaggan forming part of the north-western boundary of the locality, and exits to the south (Tarzali).

Apart from the town, the land use is predominantly grazing on native vegetation with some crop growing in the north-east of the locality.

== History ==
The area was originally called Bunjara Burra. The town takes its present name from the Jaggan railway station, which in turn was named by the Queensland Railways Department on 31 August 1915. Jaggan is an Aboriginal word meaning thick scrub with lawyer vines.

The town was surveyed in October 1916.

In June 1917, about 3 acres (1.2 ha) were reserved for a school, with Jaggan State School opening on 2 April 1918. In May 1922, there were complaints that there were 31 students enrolled with facilities only for 25 students. In August 1924, the Queensland Government committed to constructing a new school building at a cost of £640. The old school building was removed in 1925. Jagan State School closed in 1965.

== Demographics ==
In the 2016 census, the locality of Jaggan had a population of 188 people.

In the 2021 census, the locality of Jaggan had a population of 217 people.

== Education ==
There are no schools in Jaggan. The nearest government primary and secondary schools are Malanda State School and Malanda State High School, both in neighbouring Malanda to the north.
