= Middlebrook, Queensland =

Middlebrook
- Suburb
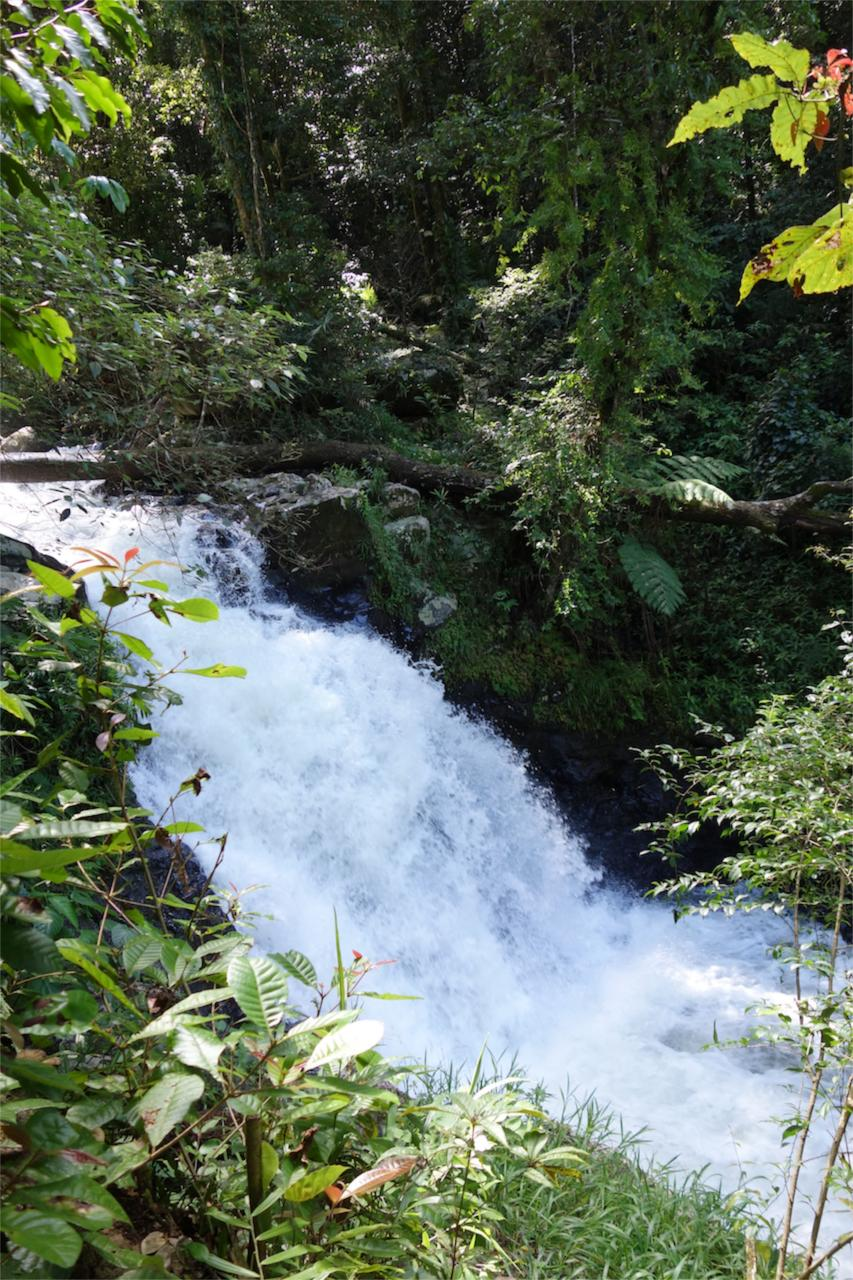
- Souita Falls, 2013

- Interactive map of Middlebrook
- Coordinates: 17.5677°S 145.6391°E
- Country: Australia
- State: Queensland
- LGA: Tablelands Region
- Location: 25.1 km (15.6 mi) ENE of Ravenshoe; 54.3 km (33.7 mi) SSE of Atherton; 70.6 km (43.9 mi) W of Innisfail; 110 km (68 mi) SW of Cairns; 1,682 km (1,045 mi) NNW of Brisbane

Government
  - State electorate: Hill
  - Federal division: Kennedy

Area
  - Total: 22.5 km^{2} (8.7 sq mi)

Population
  - Total: 62 (2021 census)
  - Density: 2.756/km^{2} (7.14/sq mi)
- Time zone: UTC+10:00 (AEST)
- Postcode: 4886
Suburbs around Middlebrook
Beatrice	Millaa Millaa	Mungalli
Beatrice	Middlebrook	Mungalli
Maalan	Palmerston	Wooroonooran

Middlebrook is a rural locality in the Tablelands Region, Queensland, Australia. In the 2021 census, Middlebrook had a population of 62 people.

== Geography ==
Middlebrook is on the Atherton Tableland with elevations ranging from 520 to 1,020 metres (1,710 to 3,350 ft).

The locality is bounded to the west by the road Beatrice Way (a segment of the old Palmerston Highway) and to the north and east by the Beatrice River.

The creek Middle Brook rises in neighbouring Beatrice to the west and flows through Middlebrook from the west to the south-east, exiting to Wooroonooran where it becomes a tributary of the Beatrice River and ultimately the Johnstone River, flowing into the Coral Sea.

The north, east and south-west of the locality are the higher more mountainous areas and are undeveloped land. The west, centre, and south of the locality are low-lying flatter where the land use is grazing on native vegetation.

== History ==
In 1922, local people requested a school in Middlebrook, claiming there were 25 children in the district. However, it was not until January 1935 that a site was chosen and approval was given to erect a school building capable of accommodating 40 students. It was also necessary to extend Middlebrook Road and build a bridge over a creek to make the school accessible. Middlebrook Road State School (also known as Middlebook State School) opened on 2 September 1935 with Charles Mathew Connolly as the first head teacher. It closed circa 14 December 1945. The school building was relocated to Millaa Millaa State School and a bus service was provided to transport the students to Millaa Millaa to attend school each day. The school was located on the eastern corner of Middlebrook Road and Barter Road (approx 17.56298°S 145.64042°E).

== Demographics ==
In the 2016 census, Middlebrook had a population of 55 people.

In the 2021 census, Middlebrook had a population of 62 people.

== Education ==
There are no schools in Middlebrook. The nearest government primary school is Millaa Millaa State School in neighbouring Millaa Millaa to the north. The nearest government secondary school is Ravenshoe State School in Ravenshoe to south-west.

== Attractions ==
There are two waterfalls on Middle Brook:

- Papina Falls (also called Pepina Falls) off Beatrice Way (17.57°S 145.6091°E)
- Souita Falls off Barter Road (17.5652°S 145.6436°E)
