= Evelyn, Queensland =

Evelyn
- Suburb
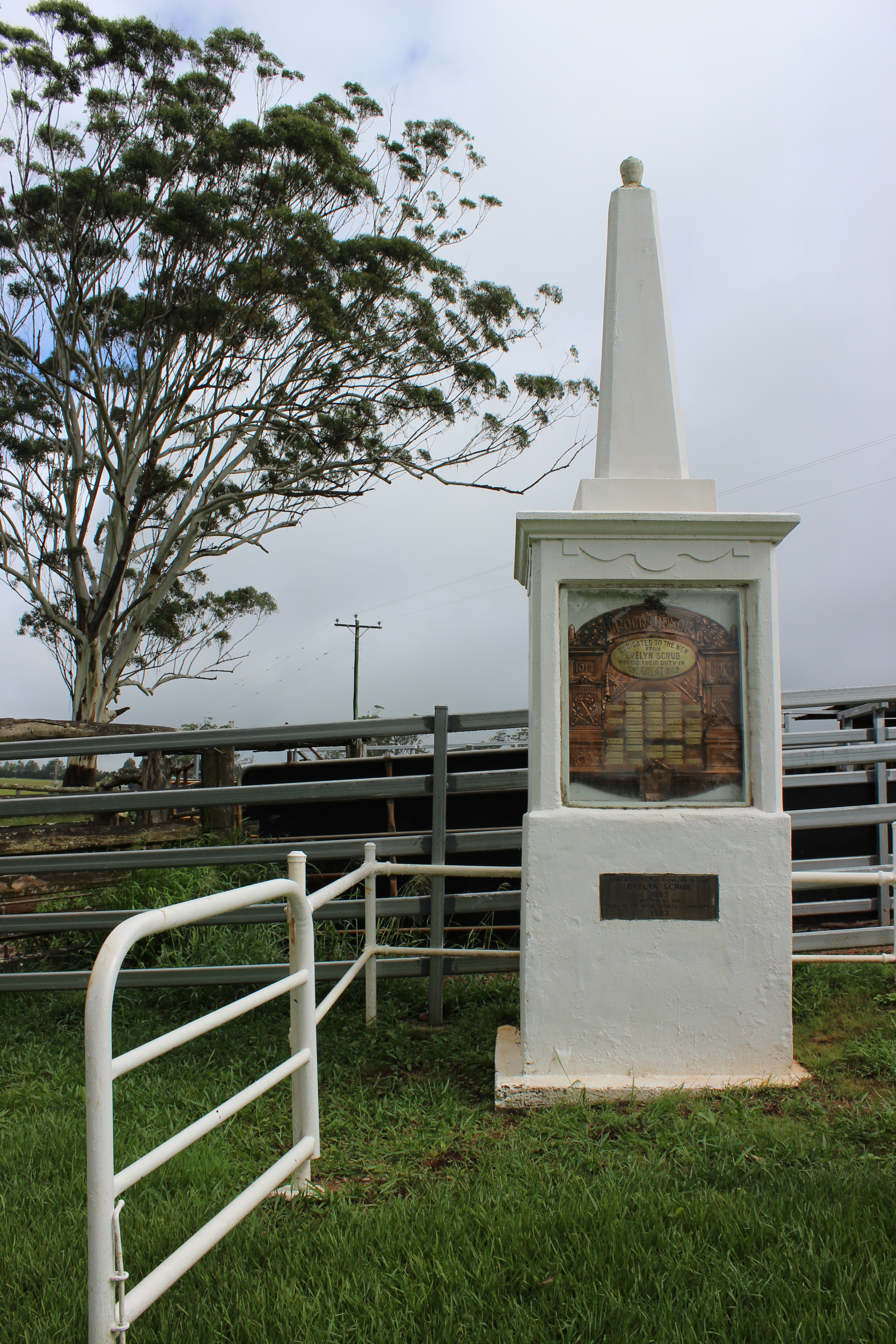
- Evelyn Scrub War Memorial, 2017

- Interactive map of Evelyn
- Coordinates: 17.5097°S 145.4891°E
- Country: Australia
- State: Queensland
- LGA: Tablelands Region
- Location: 15.6 km (9.7 mi) NNE of Ravenshoe; 37.1 km (23.1 mi) S of Atherton; 105 km (65 mi) SW of Cairns; 322 km (200 mi) NNW of Townsville; 1,680 km (1,040 mi) NNW of Brisbane

Government
  - State electorate: Hill
  - Federal division: Kennedy

Area
  - Total: 78.6 km^{2} (30.3 sq mi)

Population
  - Total: 209 (2021 census)
  - Density: 2.659/km^{2} (6.887/sq mi)
- Time zone: UTC+10:00 (AEST)
- Postcode: 4888
Suburbs around Evelyn
Wondecla	Upper Barron	Minbun
Kaban	Evelyn	Moregatta; Millaa Millaa
Tumoulin	Ravenshoe	Beatrice

Evelyn is a rural locality in the Tablelands Region, Queensland, Australia. In the 2021 census, Evelyn had a population of 209 people.

== Geography ==
The Kennedy Highway enters the locality from the north (Upper Barron) and exits to the south (Ravenshoe).

Longlands Gap–Herberton Road starts from the Kennedy Highway on the north-western boundary of the locality and proceeds north-west through Wondecla.

== History ==
The name Evelyn is taken from the name of an early pastoral run, which was named by Francis Horace Stubley (a Member of the Queensland Legislative Assembly in the Electoral district of Kennedy 1878-83), after his wife.

Evelyn Scrub Provisional School opened on 31 March 1896 with 15 students under head teacher Alice Margaret Sheehan. On 1 January 1909, it became Evelyn Scrub State School. The school closed temporarily from 1918 to 1919. It closed permanently on 19 August 1946. It was near Mill Creek on Jonsson Road (approx 17.50116°S 145.45370°E).

Geraldton Road State School opened in 1916. It closed in 1960. It was at 45 Geraldton Road (17.50658°S 145.50540°E).

== Demographics ==
In the 2011 census, Evelyn had a population of 330 people.

In the 2016 census, Evelyn had a population of 241 people.

In the 2021 census, Evelyn had a population of 209 people.

== Heritage listings ==
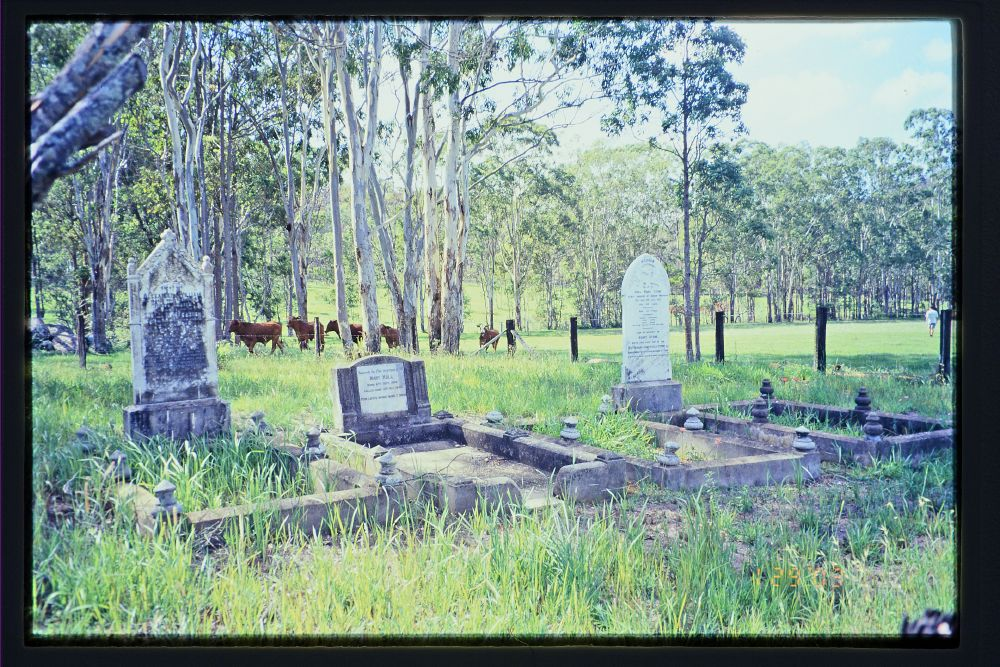
Cressbrook Cemetery, 2003

Evelyn has a number of heritage-listed sites, including:

- Evelyn Scrub War Memorial, Jonsson Road
- Cressbrook Cemetery, off Jonsson Road

== Education ==
There are no schools in Evelyn. The nearest government primary schools are Millaa Millaa State School in neighbouring Millaa Millaa to the east, Ravenshoe State School in neighbouring Ravenshoe to the south, and Herberton State School in Herberton to the north-west. The nearest government secondary schools are Ravenshoe State School (to Year 12), Herberton State School (to Year 10), and Malanda State High School (to Year 12) in Malanda to the north-east.

== Attractions ==
The highest point on a road in Queensland is on Tumoulin Road at an elevation of 1,162 metres (3,812 ft) above sea level; it is marked with a road sign (17.48004°S 145.47841°E).

== See also ==
- List of tramways in Queensland
