= Herberton Range National Park =

National park in Queensland, Australia

Herberton Range Park
- IUCN category II (national park)
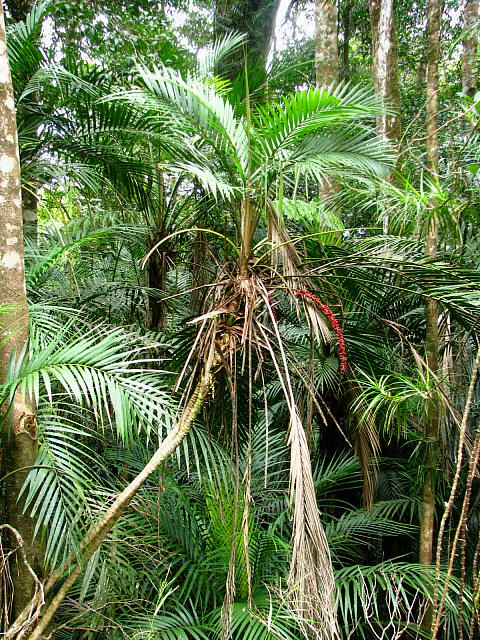
- Fruit-bearing Laccoxpadix australasica in the Herberton Range

- Location within Queensland
- Location: Queensland
- Nearest city: Herberton
- Coordinates: 17°21′55″S 145°28′5″E
- Area: 6,536 ha (25.24 sq mi)
- Established: 28 November 2008
- Governing body: Queensland Parks and Wildlife Service
- Website: Official website

Herberton Range National Park is a national park on the Atherton Tableland in north Queensland, Australia. It is located in the drainage basins of the Barron, Herbert and North Johnstone rivers. The park is located in the Tablelands Region.

Herberton Range National Park was declared from 28 November 2008, splitting from Herberton Range State Forest. The national park has a total area of 6,536 ha (16,150 acres).

Herberton Range National Park contains endangered wet sclerophyll forest, rainforest and open forest. The national park contains the summit of Mount Baldy. The national park has a temperate climate.
