= Millaa Millaa, Queensland =

Millaa Millaa
- Town
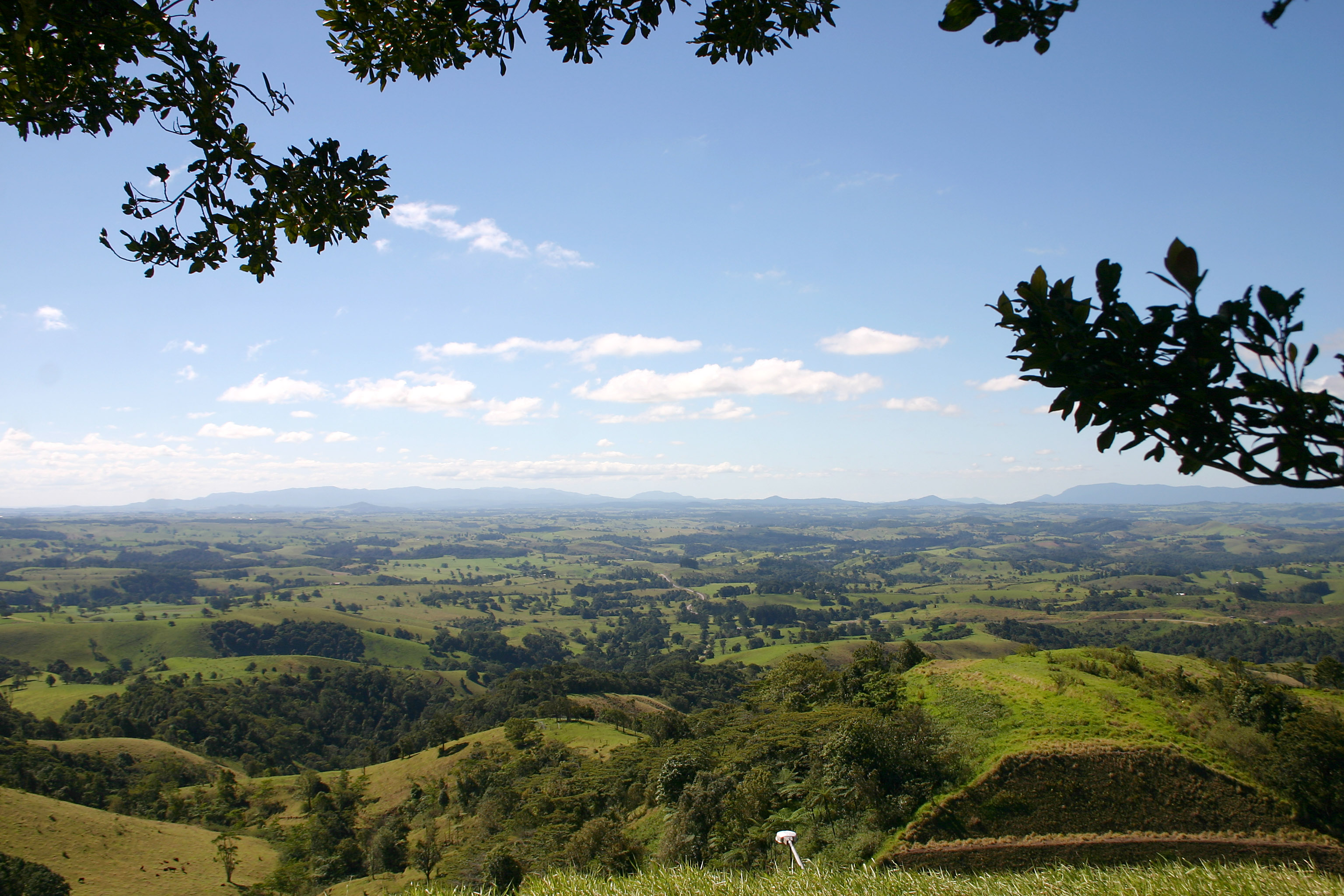
- The Millaa Millaa lookout (also called Gentle Annie lookout) presents 180-degree views from the northwest to the southeast of the Atherton Tableland

- Interactive map of Millaa Millaa
- Coordinates: 17.5111°S 145.6116°E
- Country: Australia
- State: Queensland
- LGA: Tablelands Region
- Location: 23.9 km (14.9 mi) S of Malanda; 26.2 km (16.3 mi) NE of Ravenshoe; 41.5 km (25.8 mi) SE of Atherton; 98.3 km (61.1 mi) SW of Cairns; 1,657 km (1,030 mi) NNW of Brisbane

Government
  - State electorate: Hill
  - Federal division: Kennedy

Area
  - Total: 61.5 km^{2} (23.7 sq mi)

Population
  - Total: 523 (2021 census)
  - Density: 8.504/km^{2} (22.03/sq mi)
- Time zone: UTC+10:00 (AEST)
- Postcode: 4886
Localities around Millaa Millaa
Moregatta	Tarzali	Wooroonooran
Evelyn	Millaa Millaa	Ellinjaa
Beatrice	Middlebrook	Mungalli

Millaa Millaa is a rural town and locality in the Tablelands Region, Queensland, Australia. In the 2021 census, the locality of Millaa Millaa had a population of 523 people.

== Geography ==
Millaa Millaa is on the Atherton Tableland in Far North Queensland, approximately 60 kilometres (37 mi) west of Innisfail, north of Ravenshoe, and south of Malanda.

The Millaa Millaa–Malanda Road exits to the northwest, Palmerston Highway to the southeast, and East Evelyn Road to the west.

== History ==
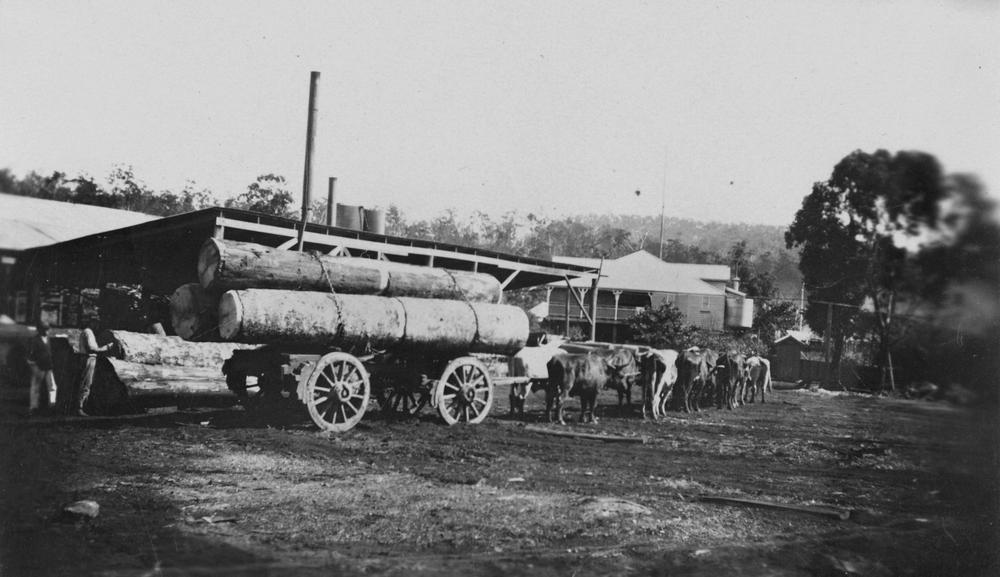
Bullock team, hauling timber, 1925

The name Millaa Millaa is probably a corruption of a Yindinji language term millai millai, probably referring to a fruit-bearing plant Elaeagnus latifolia. It is a vine with a similar habit to Bougainvillea, somewhat sprawling all over the place.

Millaa Millaa State School opened on 7 October 1918. It celebrated its centenary in 2018.

The Post Office opened by 1919 (a receiving office had been open from 1914).

Woolley's Road State School opened on 19 May 1919. In 1923, it was renamed Ellinjaa Road State School. It closed in 1949. It was on the northern corner of Ellinjaa Road and Ellinjar Falls-Theresa Creek Road (approx 17.4808°S 145.6600°E).

Innisfail Road State School (via Millaa Millaa) opened in 1924 and closed circa 1926.

Millaa Millaa butter factory opened on 1 May 1930 by James Kenny, Member of the Queensland Legislative Assembly for Cook.

On Sunday 26 September 1937 St Rita's Catholic Church was officially opened and blessed by Bishop John Heavey.

At the end of 1945, the Middlebrook Road State School in neighbouring Middlebrook closed and its school building was relocated to Millaa Millaa State School and a bus service was provided to transport the students from Middlebrook to Millaa Millaa to attend school each day.

Millaa Millaa Library opened in 2002.

== Heriage listings ==
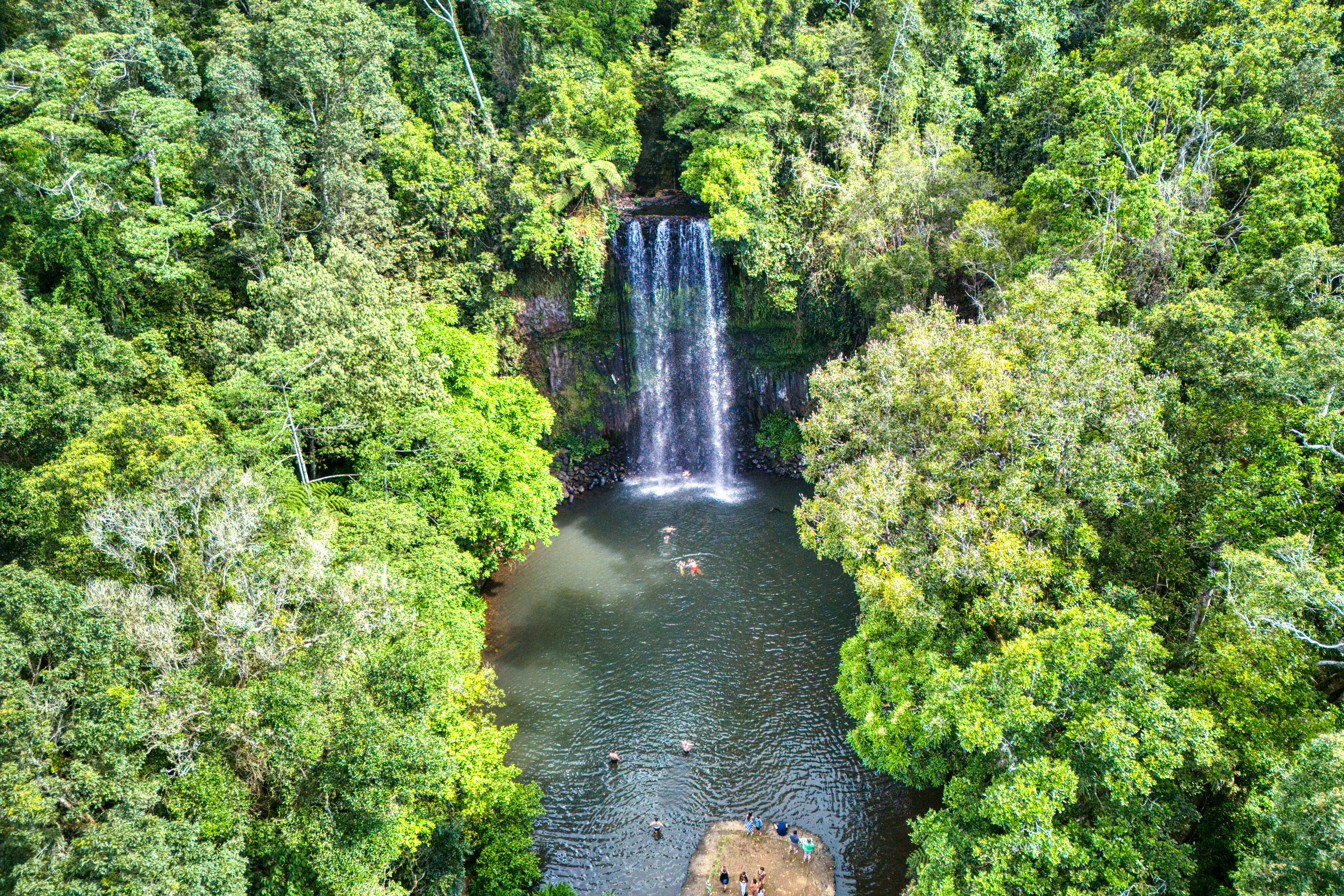
Millaa Millaa Falls

Millaa Millaa Falls is listed on the Queensland Heritage Register.

== Demographics ==
In the 2016 census, the locality of Millaa Millaa had a population of 514 people.

In the 2021 census, the locality of Millaa Millaa had a population of 523 people.

== Education ==
Millaa Millaa State School is a government primary (Prep–6) school for boys and girls at 1 Beech Street on the corner with Palm Avenue (17.5127°S 145.6101°E). In 2017, the school had an enrolment of 75 students with 6 teachers (5 full-time equivalent) and 7 non-teaching staff (5 full-time equivalent). It includes a special education program.

There are no secondary schools in Millaa Millaa. The nearest government secondary schools are Malanda State High School (to Year 12) in Malanda to the north and Ravenshoe State School (to Year 12) in Ravenshoe to the south-west.

== Amenities ==
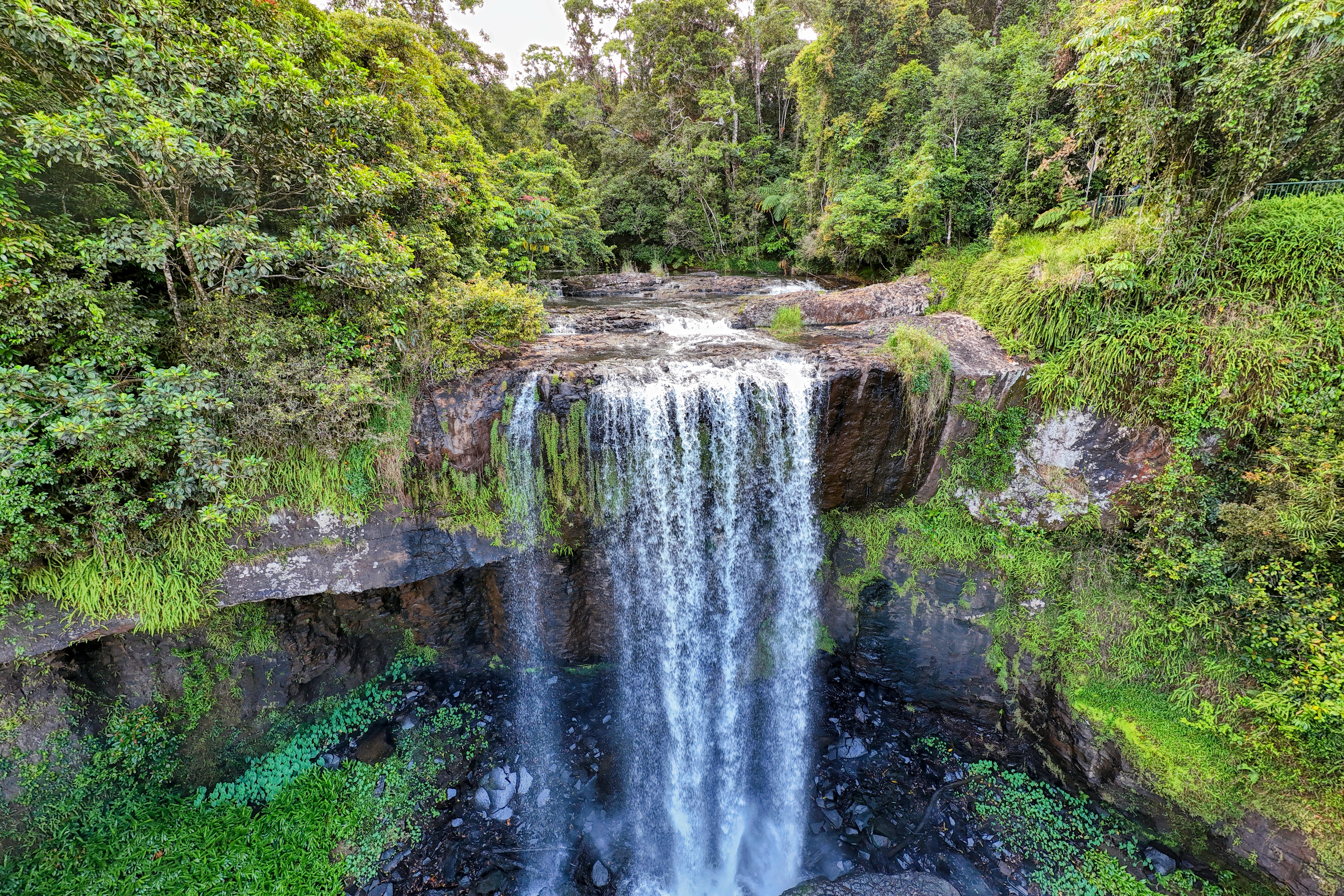
Zillie Falls

Tablelands Regional Council operates Millaa Millaa Library at 10 Main Street (17.5119°S 145.6137°E).

The Millaa Millaa branch of the Queensland Country Women's Association meets at the QCWA Hall at 9 Palm Avenue.

St Rita of Cascia's Catholic Church is at 21 Coral Street (17.5088°S 145.6119°E). It is within the Malanda Parish of the Roman Catholic Diocese of Cairns.

== Attractions ==
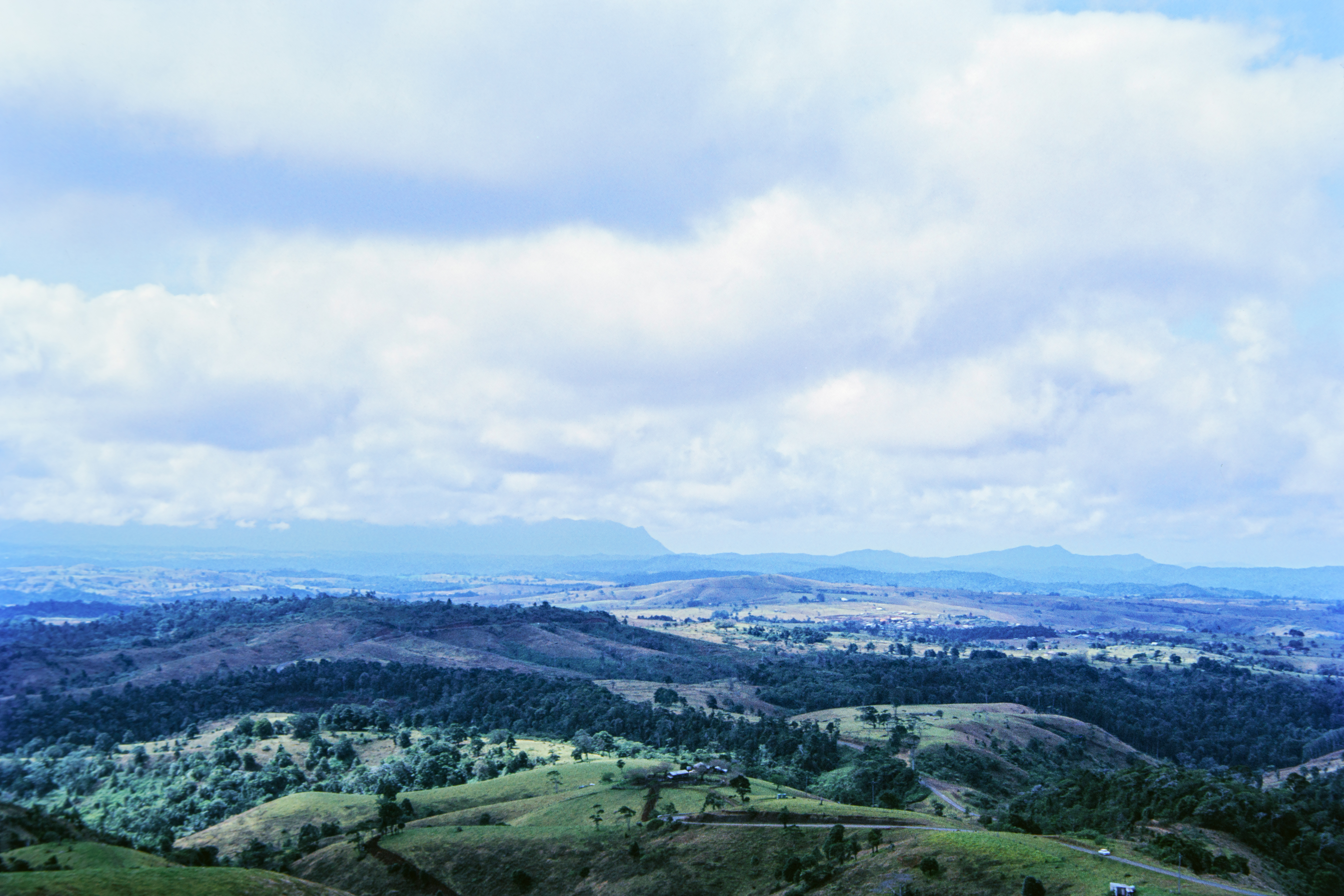
View from the Millaa Milla Lookout, 1956

The locality is known for its waterfalls. The Millaa Millaa Falls are on Millaa Millaa Falls Road, off Theresa Creek Road, 17.4950°S 145.61083°E. The Zillie Falls are at 17.4747°S 145.6567°E. There is a 17-kilometre (11 mi) waterfall circuit drive which visits these waterfalls in addition to other waterfalls in nearby areas.

There is expansive view from the Millaa Millaa Lookout (also known as the Gentle Annie Lookout) on McHugh Lookout Road off East Evelyn Road (17.5201°S 145.5679°E).

== See also ==
- List of reduplicated Australian place names
