= Roads of Strategic Importance in Queensland =

Roads of Strategic Importance in Queensland is a list of roads in Queensland, Australia, that are the subject of one or more road improvement projects under the Roads of Strategic Importance (ROSI) initiative of the Australian Government. The purposes of this document are to:

- List the strategic corridors that are wholly or partly in Queensland, with at least one project in Queensland.
- List all ROSI projects in Queensland, and provide a link to each project description.
- List all roads and associated structures targeted by ROSI projects in Queensland.
- Record the copying of project details to associated Wikipedia articles.
- Indicate projects targeted for "early works" by the Queensland Government.

== Data columns ==
The list is in the form of a table with the following date columns:

- Corridor name
- Project short name
- Road name
- Copied
- Notes

=== Corridor name ===
Corridor names from the source document (reference 1) are listed alphabetically without any division between Northern and Southern Australia corridors. A corridor name, "Non-corridor projects", is below the corridor names.

=== Project short name ===
Where a project short name differs from the project name in the source document it has been derived as follows:

- A road name, if included, has been removed.
- The remaining text has been rearranged.

For example "Flinders Highway (Townsville - Charters Towers) Wide Centre Line Treatment" is changed to "Wide centre line treatment Townsville-Charters Towers".

These project short names are listed alphabetically within each corridor, so there is no relation to the sequence of project names in the source document.

=== Road name ===
Where a road name is in the project name or the project description it has been included in this column. Where there are multiple names only one has been listed in this column. The alphabetic index for the table is based on the road name.

=== Copied ===
If used by participating editors this column indicates that the details of a project have been copied to a related Wikipedia article.

=== Notes ===
In addition to miscellaneous notes this column indicates those projects targeted for "early works" by the Queensland Government, as shown in reference 2.

== Table ==
Corridor name	Project short name	Road name	Copied	Notes	
Cairns to NT border	Corridor upgrade Croydon–Mt Garnet	Gulf Developmental Road	Yes	Early works - 2 packages	
Cairns to NT border	Corridor upgrade Future priorities	Various	Yes	Lead project	↑ (Top)
Cairns to NT border	Culvert replacement	Floraville Road		Early works	
Cairns to NT border	Progressive sealing	Ootann Road	Yes	Not in main ref.	↑ (Top)
Cooktown to Weipa	Cape York community access roads	Various	Yes	Off Peninsula Developmental Road	
Cooktown to Weipa	Corridor upgrade	Peninsula Developmental Road	Yes	Plus other roads	↑ (Top)
Cooktown to Weipa	Corridor upgrade	Peninsula Developmental Road	Yes	Lead project	
Mount Isa to Rockhampton	Corridor upgrade	Capricorn Highway	Yes/Yes	Plus Landsborough Highway	↑ (Top)
Mount Isa to Rockhampton	Yeppoon Road Duplication	Rockhampton–Yeppoon Road	Yes	In planning	↑ (Top)
Tennant Creek to Townsville	Corridor upgrades	Various - Flinders, Kennedy	Yes/Yes	Lead project	
Tennant Creek to Townsville	Overtaking lanes Townsville-Charters Towers	Flinders Highway	Yes	Early works - 2 packages	↑ (Top)
Tennant Creek to Townsville	Pavement strengthening and widening Julia Creek to Cloncurry	Flinders Highway	Yes	Early works	
Tennant Creek to Townsville	Progressive sealing The Lynd-Hughenden	Kennedy Developmental Road	Yes	Early works	↑ (Top)
Tennant Creek to Townsville	Wide centre line treatment Townsville-Charters Towers	Flinders Highway	Yes	Early works - 2 packages	
Toowoomba to Ipswich	Priority section upgrades	Warrego Highway	Yes		↑ (Top)
Toowoomba to Seymour	Priority section upgrades	Various	Yes	Lead project	
Toowoomba to Seymour	Road surface rehabilitation Pittsworth to Millmerran	Gore Highway	Yes		
Townsville to Roma	Corridor upgrade	Various - Carnarvon, Dawson, Gregory, Balonne	Yes/Yes/Yes/Yes	Lead project	
Townsville to Roma	Intersection upgrade Arcadia Valley Road	Carnarvon Highway	Yes	Early works	
Townsville to Roma	Intersection upgrade Castlereagh Highway	Carnarvon Highway	Yes/Yes	Early works	
Townsville to Roma	Intersection upgrade (Emerald); Gregory Highway	Capricorn Highway	Yes/Yes	Early works	
Townsville to Roma	Intersection upgrade Salmon Road	Carnarvon Highway	Yes	Early works	
Townsville to Roma	Orange Hill safety treatments	Carnarvon Highway	Yes	Early works	
Townsville to Roma	Pavement strengthening and widening Banana–Rolleston	Dawson Highway	Yes	Early works	
Townsville to Roma	Pavement strengthening and widening feeder road Charters Towers–The Lynd	Gregory Developmental Road	Yes	Early works	
Townsville to Roma	Progressive sealing and new bridge Springsure–Tambo	Dawson Developmental Road	Yes	Early works - 2 packages	↑ (Top)
Townsville to Roma	Roundstone Creek Bridge Overflow upgrade Banana–Rolleston	Dawson Highway	Yes	Early works	
Townsville to Roma	St George breakdown pad	Balonne Highway	Yes	Early works	↑ (Top)
Non-corridor	Biloela heavy vehicle bypass	Dawson Highway	Yes	Off the highway	
Non-corridor	Emu Swamp Dam supporting infrastructure, Stanthorpe	New England Highway	Yes	Near the highway	↑ (Top)
Non-corridor	Floodways	Glenmoral–Roundstone Road			↑ (Top)
Non-corridor	Gogango Creek bridge	Westwood–Wowan Road			
Non-corridor	Highway upgrade, Cabarlah	New England Highway	Yes		
Non-corridor	Intersection upgrade Gayndah–Mount Perry Road / Wetherton Road	Burnett Highway	Yes		
Non-corridor	Intersection upgrade Winfield Road, Watalgan	Rosedale Road			
Non-corridor	John Petersen Bridge upgrade, Mundubbera	Mundubbera–Durong Road	Yes	New article	↑ (Top)
Non-corridor	Overtaking lanes	Isis Highway	Yes		↑ (Top)
Non-corridor	Road extension	Urraween / Boundary Road		Initially two separate roads	↑ (Top)
Non-corridor	Road upgrade	Bundaberg–Bargara Road	Yes	New article	
Non-corridor	Road upgrade	Proserpine–Shute Harbour Road	Yes	New article	↑ (Top)
Non-corridor	Road upgrade	Torbanlea–Pialba Road	Yes	New article	↑ (Top)
Non-corridor	Road upgrade, Bingegang	Willies Creek–Royles Road			
Non-corridor	Road upgrade, Shoalwater Bay	Stanage Bay Road			
Non-corridor	Street upgrade, Bundaberg	Quay Street (Bundaberg–Bargara Road	Yes	New article	↑ (Top)

== Road with no Wikipedia article ==
The following road, identified as the site of a ROSI project, is a state-controlled road with no Wikipedia article:

- Torbanlea–Pialba Road – District road number 164, rated as a local road of regional significance (LRRS).

The following roads, each identified as the site of a ROSI project, also have no Wikipedia article:

- Arcadia Valley Road, Baffle West (Intersection only)
- Boundary Road, Hervey Bay
- Floraville Road, Burketown
- Glenmoral–Roundstone Road, Roundstone
- Rosedale Road, Watalgan (Intersection only)
- Salmon Road, St George (Intersection only)
- Stanage Bay Road, Shoalwater Bay
- Urraween Road, Hervey Bay
- Westwood–Wowan Road, Gogango
- Wetherton Road, Ginoondan (Intersection only)
- Willies Creek–Royles Road, Bingegang
- Winfield Road, Watalgan (Intersection only)
