= Forty Mile, Queensland =

Forty Mile
- Suburb
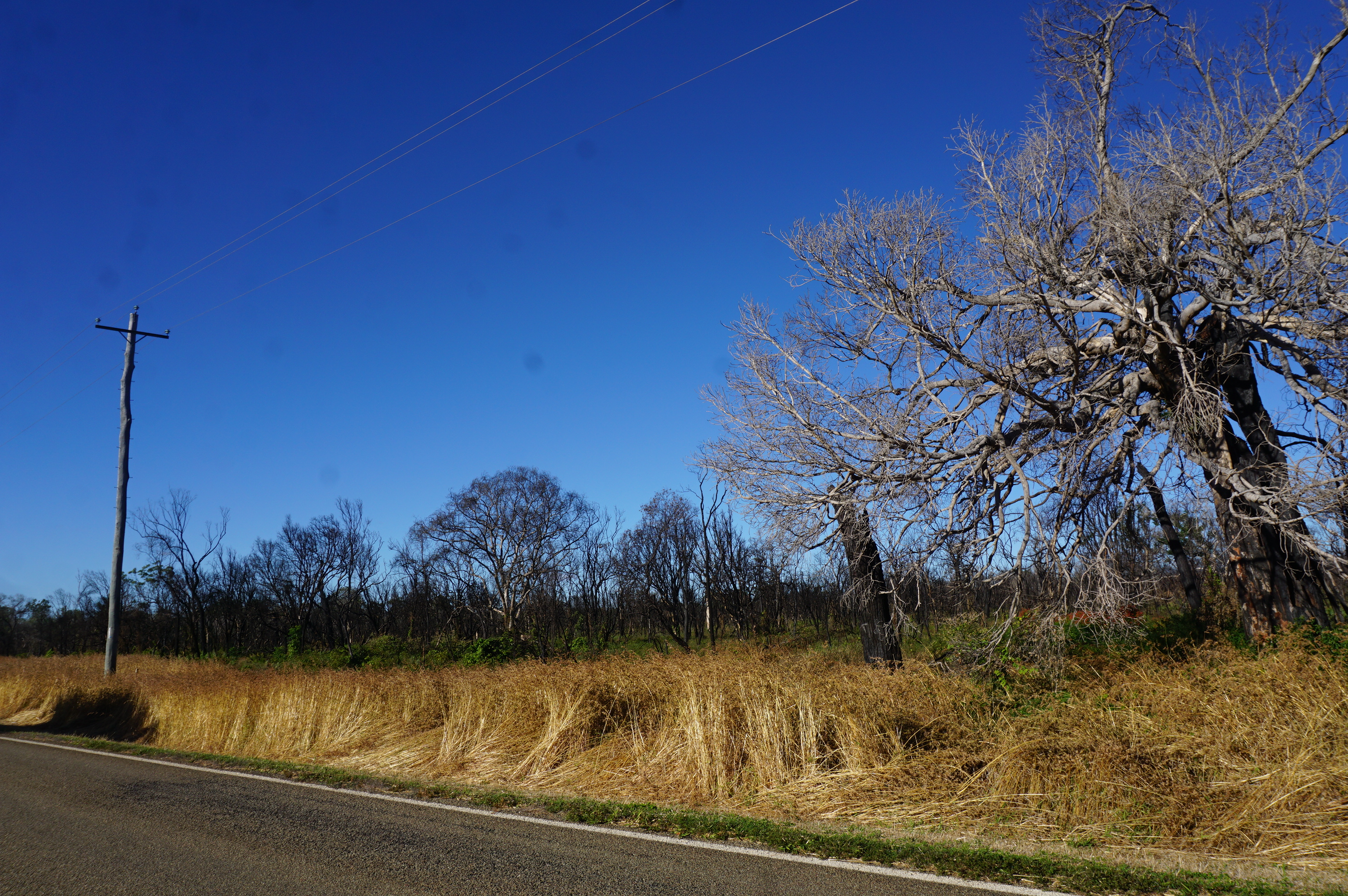
- Forty Mile Scrub National Park, 2020

- Interactive map of Forty Mile
- Coordinates: 17.9852°S 144.7366°E
- Country: Australia
- State: Queensland
- LGA: Shire of Mareeba
- Location: 68.5 km (42.6 mi) SW of Mount Garnet; 164 km (102 mi) SW of Atherton; 198 km (123 mi) SW of Mareeba; 230 km (140 mi) SW of Cairns; 1,677 km (1,042 mi) NNW of Brisbane

Government
  - State electorate: Hill
  - Federal division: Kennedy

Area
  - Total: 912.9 km^{2} (352.5 sq mi)

Population
  - Total: 18 (2021 census)
  - Density: 0.0197/km^{2} (0.0511/sq mi)
- Time zone: UTC+10:00 (AEST)
- Postcode: 4872
Suburbs around Forty Mile
| Barwidgi | Munderra | Gunnawarra |
| Springfield | Forty Mile | Gunnawarra |
| Mount Surprise | Mount Surprise | Minnamoolka |

Forty Mile is a rural locality in the Shire of Mareeba, Queensland, Australia. In the 2021 census, Forty Mile had a population of 18 people.

== Geography ==
The Great Dividing Range loosely forms most of the eastern boundary of the locality, making the locality part of the Gulf of Carpentaria drainage basin, specifically within the catchment of the Mitchell River.

The Lynd River rises in the locality and forms part of the north-west boundary; it is a tributary of the Mitchell River. Two tributaries of the Tate River, the Sandy Tate River and the Rocky Tate River, also rise in the locality.

The Kennedy Highway enters the locality from the east (Gunnawarra) and exits to the south-east (Minnamoolka), where it becomes the Kennedy Developmental Road at the intersection with the Gulf Developmental Road. The Gulf Developmental then enters Forty Mile from the south-east (Minnamoolka) and exits to the south (Mount Surprise).

Ootann Road crosses the northern part of the locality, entering from the north-east (Gunnawarra) and exiting to the north-west (Barwidgi).

Forty Mile has the following mountains (from north to south):

- Dicky Hill (17.8760°S 144.7815°E) 715 metres (2,346 ft)
- Wandoo Hill (17.8867°S 144.7446°E) 694 metres (2,277 ft)
- Mount Mist (18.0053°S 144.6456°E) 670 metres (2,200 ft)
- Lost Pinnacle (18.0385°S 144.8616°E) 790 metres (2,590 ft)

The Forty Mile Scrub National Park is in the south-east corner of the locality, extending into neighbouring Minnammolka. Undara Volcanic National Park is in the southern tip of the locality, extending into neighbouring Mount Surprise and beyond. Apart from these protected areas, the land use is predominantly grazing on native vegetation with some crop growing near the Forty Mile Scrub National Park.

== Demographics ==
In the 2016 census, Forty Mile had a population of 20 people.

In the 2021 census, Forty Mile had a population of 18 people.

== Education ==
There are no schools in Forty Mile. The nearest government primary schools are Mount Surprise State School in neighbouring Mount Surprise to the south-west and Mount Garnet State School in Mount Garnet to the north-east. However, students living near the centre of the locality might be too distant to attend either of these schools. Also, there are no secondary schools nearby. The alternatives are distance education and boarding school.
