= Minnamoolka, Queensland =

Minnamoolka
- Suburb
- Interactive map of Minnamoolka
- Coordinates: 18.2652°S 145.0427°E
- Country: Australia
- State: Queensland
- LGA: Tablelands Region
- Location: 72.0 km (44.7 mi) S of Mount Garnet; 168 km (104 mi) SW of Atherton; 233 km (145 mi) SW of Cairns; 354 km (220 mi) NW of Townsville; 1,619 km (1,006 mi) NNW of Brisbane

Government
  - State electorate: Hill
  - Federal division: Kennedy

Area
  - Total: 2,744.9 km^{2} (1,059.8 sq mi)

Population
  - Total: 27 (2021 census)
  - Density: 0.00984/km^{2} (0.0255/sq mi)
- Time zone: UTC+10:00 (AEST)
- Postcode: 4872
Suburbs around Minnamoolka
Forty Mile	Gunnawarra	Glen Ruth
Mount Surprise	Minnamoolka	Kirrama; Wairuna
Greenvale	Greenvale	Valley Of Lagoons

Minnamoolka is a rural locality in the Tablelands Region, Queensland, Australia. In the 2021 census, Minnamoolka had a population of 27 people.

== Geography ==
The Herbert River forms the north-east boundary of the locality while the Burdekin River forms part of the south-east boundary.

The locality is mountainous being part of the Great Dividing Range. There are numerous named peaks. The ridge of the Great Dividing Range passes through the west of the locality. This creates a watershed. Creeks which rise in the north-east of the locality flow north (Gunnawarra) and contribute eventually to the Herbert River which flows into the Hinchinbrook Channel at Macknade/Lucinda in the Shire of Hinchinbrook. Creeks which rise in the south-west are tributaries of the Burdekin which flows into the Coral Sea at Rita Island in the Shire of Burdekin. Meanwhile, the north-west of the locality contributes to the Mitchell River and the south-west to the Gilbert River, both of which flow into the Gulf of Carpentaria at Kowanyama (Aboriginal Shire of Kowanyama) and Howitt/Yagoonga (Shire of Carpentaria) respectively.

Kirrama National Park is located in the south of the locality. Part of the Forty Mile Scrub National Park is located in the north-west of the locality.

The Kennedy Developmental Road passes through the locality from the north-west (Forty Mile) to south-west (Greenvale).

Much of the land is undeveloped with some grazing on native vegetation.

== Demographics ==
In the 2016 census, Minnamoolka had a population of 38 people.

In the 2021 census, Minnamoolka had a population of 27 people.

== Education ==
There are no schools in Minnamoolka. The nearest government primary schools are Mount Surprise State School in neighbouring Mount Surprise to the west and Mount Garnet State School in Mount Garnet to the north. However, most students in the locality would be too distant to attend these schools. Also, there are no nearby secondary schools. The alternatives are distance education and boarding school.
