= Ootann Road =

Road in Queensland, Australia

Ootann Road Queensland

General information
- Type: Rural road
- Length: 90.5 km (56 mi)
- Route number(s): no shield

Major junctions
- North end: Burke Developmental Road Almaden
- South end: Kennedy Highway Gunnawarra

Ootann Road is a continuous 90.5 kilometres (56.2 mi) road route in the Mareeba and Tablelands local government areas of Queensland, Australia. It is a north-south link between the Burke Developmental Road and the Kennedy Highway, servicing a number of cattle grazing and production areas in northern Queensland. It is also part of the shortest route from the Chillagoe area to Hughenden.

== Route description ==
Ootann Road commences at an intersection with the Burke Developmental Road in Almaden, about 2.5 kilometres (1.6 mi) south-west of the town. It runs generally south through Almaden and Barwidgi, and then turns east through Forty Mile and Gunnawarra, ending at an intersection with the Kennedy Highway in Gunnawarra. This intersection is about 21 kilometres (13 mi) south-west of Mount Garnet.

The road initially follows the Etheridge railway line, passing a side road that leads to Ootann railway station and Ootann airport. It crosses the Sandy Tate River as it enters Barwidgi. It continues to follow the line until it reaches the former Gelaro railway station, where it crosses the line before the railway turns to the west and the road turns south-east, then south. Continuing south it crosses the Rocky Tate River and turns south-east, entering Forty Mile from the west. It then turns east, where it again crosses the Sandy Tate River. The road continues generally east across Forty Mile and Gunnawarra before meeting the Kennedy Highway.

Land use along this road is mainly stock grazing on native vegetation. There are no major intersections on this road.

== Road condition ==
Much of the road remains unsealed, but approximately 7.8 kilometres (4.8 mi) was sealed in 2018–19 under an $5.9 million project funded by the Northern Australia Beef Roads Program.

In November 2021 funding of $7.4 million under the Roads of Strategic Importance program was announced for this road.

=== Roads of Strategic Importance ===
Roads of Strategic Importance (ROSI) is a $5.8 billion initiative of the Australian Government to help connect regional businesses to markets, and to better connect regional communities. It primarily funds road infrastructure in designated strategic corridors. The $7.4 million for Ootann Road is in addition to previously funded projects for the Cairns to Northern Territory Border corridor.

== History ==
Almaden was settled as a mining town prior to 1894, when its first school opened. The railway from Mareeba arrived in 1901 on its way to the mining towns of Chillagoe and Mungana. Several pastoral runs were established in the district.

Valley of Lagoons Station is a pastoral lease about 100 kilometres (62 mi) south of Mount Garnet that was established in 1862. Gunnawarra was originally an outstation of Valley of Lagoons, but became a separate entity in 1865. Over time other pastoral runs were established in the surrounding area.

Early roads were cut from both Almaden and Gunnawarra to provide access for wheeled vehicles to the pastoral runs and other settlements. Over time these tracks were improved and extended to eventually form a through road.

== Modern usage ==
Although not yet fully sealed the road is used extensively by road trains carrying cattle, and by other large trucks conveying heavy goods.
