= Amblymoropsis australica =

Scientific classification
- Kingdom: Animalia
- Phylum: Arthropoda
- Class: Insecta
- Order: Coleoptera
- Suborder: Polyphaga
- Infraorder: Cucujiformia
- Family: Cerambycidae
- Genus: Amblymoropsis
- Species: A. australica

Binomial name
- Amblymoropsis australica (Breuning, 1963)

Species of beetle

Amblymoropsis australica is a species of beetle in the family Cerambycidae. It was described by Stephan von Breuning as being similar to Amblymoropsis papuana. It is smaller than both Amblymoropsis papuana and Amblymoropsis rufa, with a more finely punctured pronotum. It is 6 1/2 mm long and 2mm wide, and is a light red with dense, whitish marbling in the elytron. It was captured by H. Demarz near Mount Garnet, Queensland.
