= Mount Garnet Mine Assay Office =

Mt Garnet Mine Assay Office
- Location within Queensland Location within Australia
- 17.679°S 145.1114°E
- Location: Zinc Road, Mount Garnet, Tablelands Region, Queensland, Australia

History
- Design period: 1870s–1890s (late 19th century)
- Built: 1899–1900

Queensland Heritage Register
- Official name: Mt Garnet Mine Assay Office (former)
- Type: state heritage (built)
- Designated: 21 October 1992
- Reference no.: 600543
- Significant period: 1889–1890 (fabric); 1890–1910s (historical)
- Significant components: furniture/fittings

Mount Garnet Mine Assay Office is a heritage-listed assay office at Zinc Road, Mount Garnet, Tablelands Region, Queensland, Australia. It was built from 1899 to 1900. It was added to the Queensland Heritage Register on 21 October 1992.

== History ==
The former assay office was constructed in 1899 to process ore samples from the Mt Garnet Freehold Copper and Silver Mine.

The copper, silver and zinc lode at Mount Garnet was discovered in 1882 by Albert Vollenweider and Henry Faasch, who, with James McLeod, manager for John Moffat, applied for a selection of 60 acres (24 ha) in October 1882. Moffat bought his first shares from Vollenweider, Faasch and other partners in 1884 and through the 1880s acquired further shares until he had full control. He did not develop the site until the resurgence of copper prices in the 1890s when he opened up the Mount Garnet lodes in late 1896. In May 1898, crushing machinery was delivered to the site from Glen Linedale and Montalbion and a report was prepared to promote the mine to investors. By October 1898 mining leases and town lots at Mount Garnet were being purchased.

On 23 December 1898, the Mt Garnet Freehold Copper and Silver Mining Company was incorporated in Melbourne by Moffat and his associates in that city, though it was not floated until September 1899. A metallurgist and a construction engineer were appointed, assaying equipment was ordered and a brickworks and sawmill were set up in 1898 to supply building materials. The clay for the bricks was obtained from the banks of Return Creek nearby and the bricks made were used for a wide variety of constructions on site, commencing with the furnaces. Work began in 1899 on an assay office to service the mine and it was finished by 1900. Assaying on site was important in order to test ore quality and so provide a guide for the exploitation of the mine and the smelting operations. The assay building was used as a laboratory for determining the level of metal contained within the ore and the level of impurities contained within the metal after smelting. The building constructed for this purpose measured approximately 17.5 by 11 metres (57 by 36 ft) and contained seven rooms, including a furnace room and offices, a room for chemical treatments and a room to house the scales.

Throughout 1899 the company employed about 150 men in sinking and driving shafts to test ore reserves. Six shafts aggregating 440 feet (130 m) were sunk, and nearly 1,200 feet (370 m) of tunnels and drives were completed. By early 1900, an ore lode 96 feet (29 m) wide but of uncertain depth had been found. Assays were encouraging and it was estimated that reserves totalled over 200,000 long tons (200,000 t) of ore averaging between three and twenty-five per cent copper, with fifteen ounces of silver to the ton.

It was decided to install new large smelters, with a 200-long-ton (200 t) daily capacity and powerful mining machinery, and to dam Return Creek to provide adequate water for the treatment plant. Also, multi-tubular boilers, a powerful double cylinder hoisting engine, stone crushers, air compressors, a sawmill and water pumping station were established in association with the mining of the Mount Garnet lode. A railway to serve the mine was also planned.

On 15 January 1901, the first smelter became operational and in that year the smelters treated 35,616 long tons (36,188 t) of ore for copper and silver valued at £163,000. In the following year a total of 43,284 long tons (43,979 t) of ore were treated for 2,057 long tons (2,090 t) of copper and 486,651 ounces (13,796,300 g) of silver valued at £164,267. The mine employed about 1,800 men and Mount Garnet became the second-largest inland town in Queensland.

However, the large sums committed to infrastructure, falling prices and problems with ore quality caused the mine to close as the company admitted it was unable to meet its interest and redemption commitments. The smelter opened again in June 1902, but Willcocks and Overend, the contractors for the railway which opened on 22 February 1902, foreclosed on 1 October 1902. A new company was floated but in 1903 it was found that the main shaft, down 181 feet (55 m), tapped a sizeable body, which proved to be refractory, having high zinc content and thus being uneconomic to treat by conventional means on site. Further, the open-cut section of the mine collapsed. The smelter ceased operation in May 1903 and the smelters were dismantled and removed. Willcocks and Overend operated the railway privately to help recoup their costs and the New Chillagoe Railway and Mines Ltd worked the mine on tribute from the beginning of 1904, although much of the machinery was removed to the OK mine the same year. Attempts were made to reopen the mine in 1906 and again in 1915, when the mine remained open for a couple of years. In 1914 the Queensland Government purchased the railway.

The assay office was then used for many years to accommodate pastoral workers from Mount Lucey station, although it was unused when purchased in the late 1980s and renovated. It has been adapted as a residence and although the fume cupboard and sample table are still present, alterations include the replacement of the sample furnaces with a fireplace and conversion of the scale room to a bathroom and the chemical treatment room to a kitchen. The furnace area is now a living room and the offices in this section are bedrooms. It is the only building surviving from the Mount Garnet mine on site.

== Description ==
The assay office is located approximately 500 metres (1,600 ft) south-west of the outskirts of Mount Garnet and approximately 500 metres (1,600 ft) south of the Kennedy Highway, to which it is linked by a track. Mount Garnet is located approximately 100 kilometres (62 mi) by road west of Cairns.

The assay office is a single-storeyed brick and sheet iron clad building on brick foundations. It comprises two sections; that to the west is constructed of brick and contains a living area and bedrooms. Sash windows and doorways have curved heads featuring a double row of bricks. The building has a gabled roof clad in corrugated iron and a verandah extends along the northern wall shaded by a curved metal awning supported on timber posts. A deep awning shelters the windows to the western side.

This brick construction is joined on the eastern side by a section that has walls clad in sheet metal and a gabled roof set at right angles to that of the brick building. This area retains a timber floor and has a ventilated fume cabinet used in the testing of ore and metal samples. It now contains and bathroom and kitchen. The building is well lit with sash windows in both sections.

The area around the building has been cultivated as irrigated ornamental gardens. Some metal artefacts from the mine remain in the grounds.

The site may contain remains of slag heaps.

== Heritage listing ==
The former Mount Garnet Mine Assay Office was listed on the Queensland Heritage Register on 21 October 1992 having satisfied the following criteria.

The place is important in demonstrating the evolution or pattern of Queensland's history.

The former assay office is the only building surviving from the Mount Garnet copper and silver mine and smelter operation built on this site in the 1890s. It is important in demonstrating the development of the mining industry in North Queensland, and the establishment of the township of Mount Garnet. The mine, a development of John Moffat, who was an important figure in the mining industry in the north, was only briefly in production. Its demise due to overcapitalisation of an unproven ore body and falling ore prices illustrates the speculative nature of much mining activity in Queensland in this era.

The place demonstrates rare, uncommon or endangered aspects of Queensland's cultural heritage.

The former Mount Garnet Mine assay office is a rare surviving example of this type of facility situated close to the site of the mine and smelter. Although assay offices were a common and important feature of mining infrastructure, the majority in Queensland have not survived. The building is externally intact and has retained some features of its original use, although it has been adapted as a dwelling.
