= Coconut laurel =

Coconut laurel can refer to:

- Cryptocarya cocosoides
- Cryptocarya cunninghamii
