= Nettle Creek Tin Dredge =

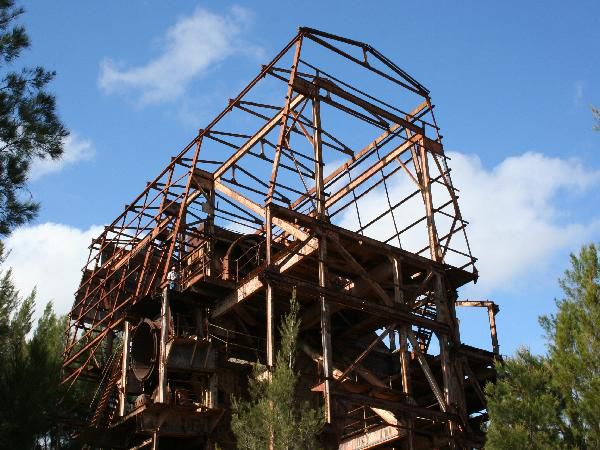
- Nettle Creek Tin Dredge, 2009

- Location within Queensland Location within Australia
- 17.7156°S 145.2415°E
- Location: Nettle Creek, Innot Hot Springs, Tablelands Region, Queensland, Australia

History
- Design period: 1940s–1960s (post-World War II)
- Built: 1957

Queensland Heritage Register
- Official name: Nettle Creek Tin Dredge, Barrytown 2 Dredge, Barrytown Gold Dredge, Battle Creek Tin Dredge
- Type: state heritage (built)
- Designated: 22 September 1995
- Reference no.: 601534
- Significant period: c. 1937, 1954–1957 (fabric); 1957–1992 (historical)
- Significant components: pontoon, machinery/plant/equipment – mining/mineral processing, crane / gantry

Nettle Creek Tin Dredge is a heritage-listed dredge at Nettle Creek, Innot Hot Springs, Tablelands Region, Queensland, Australia. It was built in 1957. It is also known as Barrytown 2 Dredge, Barrytown Gold Dredge, and Battle Creek Tin Dredge. It was added to the Queensland Heritage Register on 22 September 1995.

== History ==
The Alluvial Gold Co Ltd purchased the Battle Creek and Nettle Creek alluvial dredging leases from The Broken Hill Proprietary Co Ltd in August 1949. The leases were situated between Ravenshoe and Mount Garnet, North Queensland, and comprised tin bearing deposits which followed the courses of Battle and Nettle Creeks with both areas crossing the Kennedy Highway between Ravenshoe and Mount Garnet. The Nettle Creek area was divided into two sections, the upper section was shallow and crossed by several granite bars, but was rich in tin.

Alluvial cassiterite (SnO_{2} tin oxide) has been mined in the Mount Garnet area since 1881. In the area, the four creeks (Smiths, Return, Battle and Nettle Creeks) have provided the majority of the concentrates. Bucket line dredging was begun on Return Creek by Tableland Tin Dredging Co Ltd in the early to mid 1930s, and on Battle Creek by Ravenshoe Tin Dredging Co Ltd in 1957.

The Nettle Creek Tin Dredge was originally designed by FW Payne & Sons, England, and built c.1937 (according to photographs of the dredge under construction) in New Zealand by the Oak Ridge Co Ltd for Gold Mines Of New Zealand Co Ltd. The dredge was named the FW Payne and was operated as a gold dredge for Barrytown Gold Dredging Co Ltd in Barrytown, located on the West Coast of the South Island. All the original equipment was British, including the two surviving Richardson electric motors and bucket drive cog wheels, and a Vaughan 15 long tons (15 t) gantry crane. The dredge originally had approximately sixty 12 cubic feet (0.34 m^{3}) buckets, and the Richardson RGP motors were supplied by cable with power from a land-based generator plant.

Alluvial Gold Co Ltd had the FW Payne dismantled in New Zealand, and the Ravenshoe Tin Dredging Co Ltd, which was established in 1953, purchased the dredge which arrived in Queensland in 1954. The dredge was landed in Cairns, railed to Mt. Garnet where a new pontoon was constructed at Battle Creek and it was rebuilt. The dredge was considerably modified by the Alluvial Mining Equipment Co Ltd to make it suitable to dredge the above leases, as conditions of the lease to rehabilitate the tailings required a by-pass conveyor to be installed. The dredge was required to excavate a 20 feet (6.1 m) depth of overburden which by-passed the treatment plant and was deposited over the tailings at the stern, and to dig 40 feet (12 m) below water level into the ore bearing sand and gravel.

The re-erection of the dredge was completed on the Battle Creek area in November 1957 and commenced working upstream, until 1962 when it worked south across the highway. The dredge as modified was considered a most successful unit, having given good running time with reasonable maintenance, considering the most difficult and hard dredging conditions it has passed through. The dredge operated 7 days per week, 24 hours per day with a staff of 70 working 4 shifts.

The dredging of Battle Creek finished in February 1965, and the dredge was dismantled and a new pontoon was constructed on Nettle Creek north of the highway. From 1965 to 1992 the dredge worked down Nettle Creek, across the highway, to its present location. It had completed the original area by 1976, after which time the dredge worked the lower reaches of Nettle Creek.

The development of the bucket line dredge began in 1877 in the gold fields along the Clutha River in Otago, New Zealand. The second stage of dredge development is credited to the Californian gold fields, and higher capacity units were engineered. From gold the use of bucket line dredges spread to tin mining in Malaysia and Indonesia. The first reported unit in this area was off Phuket, Thailand in 1907.

Bucket line dredges are more capable of handling boulders and timber than other forms of dredges such as suction cutters. A dredge may be designed to handle the particular conditions of the area to be mined, including the presence of boulders, timber, gravel, sands, hard bands and clays.

== Occurrence of Tin ==
Ore Tin ore occurs naturally as brown or black grains of free cassiterite (SnO_{2}) and it is frequently found with the gravel in ancient or present creek beds where it was deposited by the alluvial action of running water after weathering from the original lode. Cassiterite contains almost 80% tin and after concentration is dried, bagged and shipped to smelters where it is cast into metal ingots. Its main use is for coating metal cans, but it is also an important constituent of alloys and solder.

Because of the low concentration of cassiterite in an alluvial deposit, large quantities of material must be handled in recovering it. The alluvial deposits generally occur at relatively shallow depths and it is possible, by test boring, to ascertain fairly accurately the extent of the area to be mined and the amount of tin ore likely to be recovered. Where sufficient water is available the most economical method of mining the deposit is by dredging.

=== Operation of a Bucket Line Dredge ===
A mining dredge comprises a mechanical excavator and a screening, washing and concentrating plant, all mounted on a pontoon. The dredge performs four functions:

- Excavates the alluvial material
- Screens the material into two or more sizes, usually with a revolving screen
- Treats the fines to recover their metallic or heavy components, usually on tables or jigs
- Deposits the fines from the treatment plant and the coarse rejects from the screen to the rear of the dredge

The dredge floats in an artificial pond often supplied with water from an outside source. It digs at the bow and deposits washed tailings at the stern, thus carrying the pond with it as it advances. The digging end comprises an endless chain of cast manganese steel buckets carried on a fabricated steel ladder at an angle of approximately 45 degrees when operating at maximum depth. The ladder carries a circular tumbler at its lower end and a series of rollers on its upper side to support the loaded buckets. The top, or driving, tumbler is normally hexagonal in shape and is driven by electric motors mounted on either side of the ladder. The size of a dredge is designated by the capacity of its individual bucket which can be up to 20 cubic feet but, in the case of the Nettle Creek dredge is 12 cubic feet.

As the buckets pass over the top tumbler they discharge into a hopper from where a chute directs the dredged material into a revolving (or trommel) screen. Here it is washed by high pressure water jets, the fine ore-bearing material passing through the perforations (normally about 10 millimetres (0.39 in) in size) and proceeding to the treatment plant and the oversize material continuing over the screen. The undersize from the screen is passed to ore concentrating and recovery equipment, consisting at Nettle Creek of a series of pulsating jigs. The concentrate is removed for further treatment while the tailings are discharged down a sluice at the stern of the dredge.

The oversize from the trommel screen is passed to a conveyor mounted on a moveable arm at the stern of the dredge (normally called a stacker) and deposited behind the dredge. Traditionally, it is not rehabilitated but at Nettle Creek it is a requirement that the tailings be levelled and covered with topsoil, thereby restoring the dredged area to near its original state. This is accomplished by digging the topsoil ahead of the normal cut and passing it direct to the stacker on a by-pass conveyor for deposition on top of the tailings. The area is subsequently levelled by a bulldozer ready for normal agricultural use.

== Description ==
The Nettle Creek Tin Dredge is located in Nettle Creek, 14 kilometres (8.7 mi) east of Mount Garnet and 6 kilometres (3.7 mi) south of Innot Hot Springs. Permission is needed from Woodleigh Station to access a track, south from the Kennedy Highway along the west bank of Nettle Creek.

The dredge is 47 metres (154 ft) long, 23 metres (75 ft) wide and 20 metres (66 ft) high above the pontoon deck, which in 1.9 metres (6 ft 3 in) deep. The dredge consists of a steel structure with three main levels supported by a pontoon located beached within the dredge pond. Most of the corrugated iron cladding has been removed, except for half a wall on the upper level.

All of the electrics have been removed, and only four jigs of the original eleven remain. A Vaughan gantry crane is located on the top level and two Richardson engines are on the base level. All of the buckets have been removed.

The dredge is located at its final point of operation in a pond contained by a partly breached earth dam. The course of Nettle Creek to the north is evidence of the dredge's operation and comprises a wide swathe of sandy, unrehabilitated watercourse largely devoid of trees or scrub.

== Heritage listing ==
Nettle Creek Tin Dredge was listed on the Queensland Heritage Register on 22 September 1995 having satisfied the following criteria.

The place is important in demonstrating the evolution or pattern of Queensland's history.

The Mt Garnet area is one of the earliest locations associated with tin mining in Far North Queensland, which gave significant impetus to the economic development of the region.

The place is important in demonstrating the principal characteristics of a particular class of cultural places.

As a relic, the Nettle Creek Tin Dredge still demonstrates bucket line dredging, a once common mining process, which was employed to extract tin ore from alluvial deposits. The Nettle Creek Tin Dredge and dredge pond are the most complete evidence of this form of tin mining in Queensland. The dredge is a good example of the adaptability of some items of mining equipment, in this case from dredging gold in New Zealand to tin in Far North Queensland. The site provides tangible evidence of the often mercurial nature of an industry susceptible to fluctuations in base metal prices.
