= Millstream, Queensland =

Millstream
- Suburb
- Interactive map of Millstream
- Coordinates: 17.6261°S 145.3811°E
- Country: Australia
- State: Queensland
- LGA: Tablelands Region
- Location: 10.5 km (6.5 mi) WSW of Ravenshoe; 61 km (38 mi) SSW of Atherton; 126 km (78 mi) SSW of Cairns; 343 km (213 mi) NNW of Townsville; 1,690 km (1,050 mi) NNW of Brisbane

Government
  - State electorate: Hill
  - Federal division: Kennedy

Area
  - Total: 195.6 km^{2} (75.5 sq mi)

Population
  - Total: 981 (2021 census)
  - Density: 5.015/km^{2} (12.990/sq mi)
- Time zone: UTC+10:00 (AEST)
- Postcode: 4888
Suburbs around Millstream
Silver Valley	Kaban	Tumoulin
Silver Valley	Millstream	Ravenshoe
Innot Hot Springs	Innot Hot Springs	Koombooloomba

Millstream is a rural locality in the Tablelands Region, Queensland, Australia. In the 2021 census, Millstream had a population of 981 people.

== Geography ==
Millstream is bounded to the west by the Wild River, while The Millstream flows from east to south-west through the locality. Their confluence which creates the Herbert River is just to the south-west of the locality in neighbouring Innot Hot Springs.

Smaller farm blocks are found in the southern part of the locality, just to the north of The Millstream, where the land is flatter (about 730 metres above sea level). However, much of the locality is mountainous, rising to unnamed peaks of about 1000 metres above sea level); this area is not developed. The northern part of the locality forms part of The Bluff State Forest. Millstream Falls and the associated Millstream Falls National Park are not in the locality but immediately adjacent in neighbouring Koombooloomba.

The Kennedy Highway passes through the locality from east to west.

== Demographics ==
In the 2016 census, Millstream had a population of 1,246 people.

In the 2021 census, Millstream had a population of 981 people.

== Education ==
There are no schools in Millstream. The nearest government primary schools are Ravenshoe State School in neighbouring Ravenshoe to the east, Mount Garnet State School in Mount Garnet to the west, and Irvinebank State School in Irvinebank to the north-west. The nearest government secondary school is Ravenshoe State School (to Year 12).
