= Kirrama National Park =

National park in Australia

- IUCN category II (national park)
- Location within Queensland
- Location: Queensland
- Nearest city: Mount Garnet
- Coordinates: 18°27′12″S 144°56′59″E
- Area: 75.80 km^{2} (29.27 sq mi)
- Established: 2006
- Governing body: Queensland Parks and Wildlife Service
- Website: Official website

Kirrama National Park is a national park in Minnamoolka, Tablelands Region of Far North Queensland, Australia. The park protects rugged mountain landscapes, lush tropical rainforest and open eucalypt forests.

It forms part of the Wet Tropics World Heritage Area. The park lies with the water catchment area of the Burdekin River. There are a diverse range of plants and animals found in the area.

== Access ==
Access to the park is provided by the Kennedy Development Road south of Mount Garnet. In 2011, access to the park was restricted when Kirrama Range Road was closed. The historic gravel track and numerous bridges were damaged by floods after Cyclone Yasi passed through the area in early 2011.

== Facilities ==
There are no facilities in the park except for the Society Flat rainforest walk which consists of a 720 m long circuit. Camping is not permitted within the park.

== See also ==
- Blencoe Falls
- Protected areas of Queensland
