= Amblymoropsis rufa =

Scientific classification
- Kingdom: Animalia
- Phylum: Arthropoda
- Class: Insecta
- Order: Coleoptera
- Suborder: Polyphaga
- Infraorder: Cucujiformia
- Family: Cerambycidae
- Genus: Amblymoropsis
- Species: A. rufa

Binomial name
- Amblymoropsis rufa (Breuning, 1970)

Species of beetle

Amblymoropsis rufa is a species of beetle in the family Cerambycidae. It was described by Stephan von Breuning in 1970. It is light red with fine, yellowish pubsence, and is 7mm long and 2mm wide. Breuning encountered it in Cenderawasih Bay in New Guinea, and described it as being similar to Amblymoropsis papuana.
