= Gunnawarra, Queensland =

Gunnawarra
- Suburb
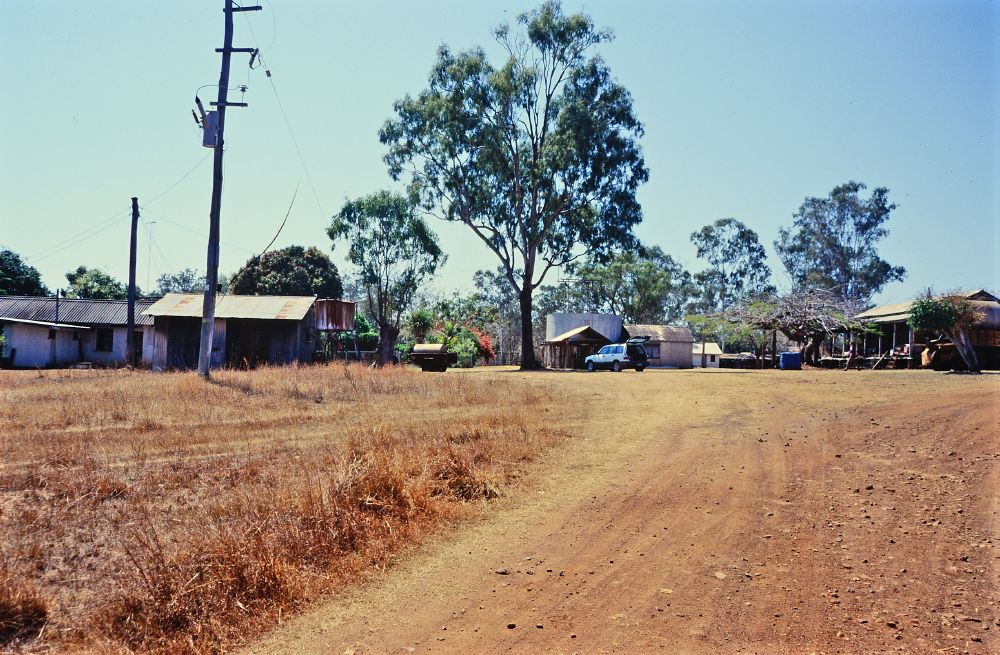
- Gunnawarra Homestead, from the west, 2001

- Interactive map of Gunnawarra
- Coordinates: 17.8902°S 145.0722°E
- Country: Australia
- State: Queensland
- LGA: Tablelands Region
- Location: 43.7 km (27.2 mi) S of Mount Garnet; 90.1 km (56.0 mi) SW of Ravenshoe; 140 km (87 mi) SW of Atherton; 205 km (127 mi) SW of Cairns; 1,716 km (1,066 mi) NNW of Brisbane

Government
  - State electorate: Hill
  - Federal division: Kennedy

Area
  - Total: 956.2 km^{2} (369.2 sq mi)

Population
  - Total: 27 (2021 census)
  - Density: 0.0282/km^{2} (0.0731/sq mi)
- Time zone: UTC+10:00 (AEST)
- Postcode: 4872
Suburbs around Gunnawarra
Munderra	Mount Garnet	Innot Hot Springs
Forty Mile	Gunnawarra	Innot Hot Springs
Forty Mile	Minnamoolka	Glen Ruth

Gunnawarra is a rural locality in the Tablelands Region, Queensland, Australia. In the 2021 census, Gunnawarra had a population of 27 people.

== Geography ==
Gunnawarra is 207 kilometres (129 mi) south-west of Cairns via the Bruce Highway, Gillies Range Road, Lake Barrine Road, State Route 25, State Route 24, the Kennedy Highway and Gunnawarra Road. From further west it can be accessed via the Kennedy Highway.

The Herbert River forms most of the eastern boundary.

The Kennedy Highway crosses the north-west corner from the north. Ootann Road enters from the north-west.

Gunnawarra has the following mountains (from north to south):

- Mount Bear (17.8426°S 144.9044°E) 842 metres (2,762 ft)
- Mount Kallon (17.8548°S 144.9294°E) 826 metres (2,710 ft)
- Gunnawarra Bump (18.0007°S 145.1982°E) 740 metres (2,430 ft)

The land use is grazing on native vegetation.

== History ==
The name Gunnawarra comes from the pastoral property established by Walter Jervoise Scott and his brother Arthur Jervoise Scott, and is derived from Aboriginal words gunnaya meaning camp and warra meaning small.

== Demographics ==
In the 2016 census, Gunnawarra had a population of 13 people.

In the 2021 census, Gunnawarra had a population of 27 people.

== Heritage listings ==
Gunnawarra has a number of heritage-listed sites, including:

- Gunnawarra Homestead, Gunnawarra Road (17.9366°S 145.1651°E)

== Education ==
There are no schools in Gunnawarra. The nearest government primary school is Mount Garnet State School in neighbouring Mount Garnet to the north. The nearest government secondary school is Ravenshoe State School (to Year 12) in Ravenshoe to the north-east.

== Tourism ==
Gunnawarra is the start and end of two sections of the Bicentennial National Trail.
