= Gulf Developmental Road =

Highway in Queensland, Australia

Gulf Developmental Road Queensland
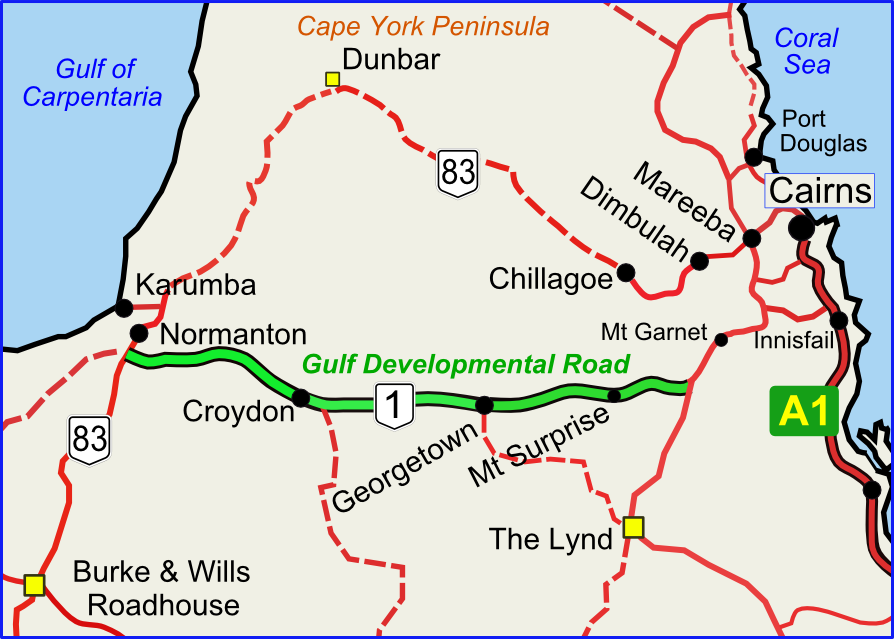
- Gulf Developmental Road (green on black)

General information
- Type: Rural road
- Length: 442 km (275 mi)
- Route number(s): National Route 1

Major junctions
- West end: Savannah Way (National Route 1) / Burke Developmental Road (State Route 83), 7 km (4.3 mi) south of Normanton, Queensland
- Gregory Highway
- East end: Kennedy Highway (National Route 1) / Kennedy Developmental Road, (State Route 62) Forty Mile Scrub, Queensland

Location(s)
- Major settlements: Croydon, Georgetown, Mount Surprise

Gulf Developmental Road is an Australian highway linking the Cairns and Normanton regions in northern Queensland, Australia. It is the only sealed (asphalt) road linking these two regions, and is designated Highway 1 in the Queensland part of the national Highway 1 network.

== Description ==
In the east, the Gulf Developmental Road begins at an unnamed junction on the southern edge of Forty Mile Scrub National Park, 241 km (150 mi) south-west of Cairns. It runs west before terminating at its junction with the Burke Developmental Road 7 km (4.3 mi) south of Normanton, a total distance of 442 km (275 mi). It links Cairns and Normanton, and is the only sealed (asphalt) road linking these two regions. It is sealed for its full length, but as of 2018 there were many sections of the road which were only single-lane bitumen, with gravel shoulders, requiring vehicles to move partly onto the shoulders. These sections extend between points about 55 km (34 mi) west of Georgetown and 20 km (12 mi) west of Mount Surprise.

Towns along the route include Mount Surprise, Georgetown and Croydon. There are no other communities along the route, but it passes through the ghost town of Cumberland.

The Gulf Developmental Road is designated Highway 1. It is not part of the National Highway network.

== Major intersections ==
This road has only one major intersection, with the Gregory Highway in the locality of Mount Surprise.

== Upgrades ==
The Roads of Strategic Importance initiative, last updated in March 2022, includes the following projects for the Gulf Developmental Road.

=== Corridor upgrade ===
A lead project to upgrade the Cairns to Northern Territory border corridor, including the Gulf Developmental Road and surrounding state and council roads, at an estimated cost of $62.5 million, was commenced in 2020, with planning continuing.

=== Pavement strengthening and widening ===
A project for pavement strengthening and widening of sections of the Gulf Developmental Road between Mount Garnet and Croydon at a cost of $21.5 million was planned to be completed by mid-2022. This project was targeted for "early works" by the Queensland Government, and was split into two packages.

== See also ==
- Einasleigh River Bridge
- Highways in Australia
- List of highways in Queensland
- Wills Developmental Road
- Gibb River Road
