= Kirrama, Queensland =

Kirrama
- Suburb
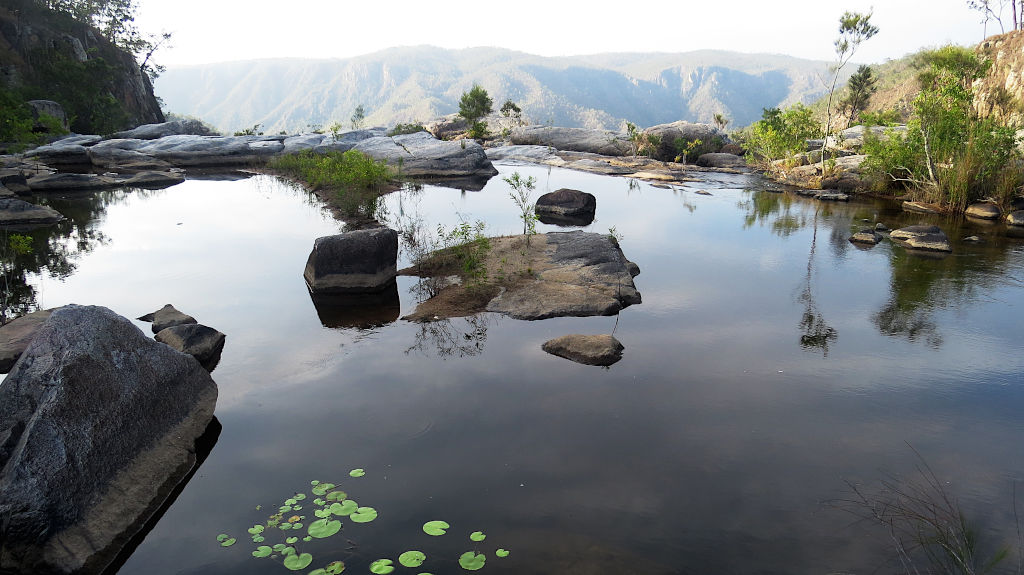
- Pool at the top of Blencoe Falls, 2022

- Interactive map of Kirrama
- Coordinates: 18.1825°S 145.5636°E
- Country: Australia
- State: Queensland
- LGA: Tablelands Region
- Location: 65.4 km (40.6 mi) NW of Cardwell; 219 km (136 mi) S of Atherton; 227 km (141 mi) SSE of Cairns; 230 km (140 mi) NW of Townsville; 1,586 km (985 mi) NNW of Brisbane

Government
  - State electorate: Hill
  - Federal division: Kennedy

Area
  - Total: 815.2 km^{2} (314.8 sq mi)

Population
  - Total: 0 (2021 census)
  - Density: 0.0000/km^{2} (0.0000/sq mi)
- Time zone: UTC+10:00 (AEST)
- Postcode: 4872
Suburbs around Kirrama
Glen Ruth	Koombooloomba	Kooroomool
Minnamoolka	Kirrama	Murray Upper
Minnamoolka	Wairuna	Lumholtz

Kirrama is a rural locality in the Tablelands Region, Queensland, Australia. In the 2021 census, Kirrama had "no people or a very low population".

== Geography ==
The locality is bounded to the south and west by the Herbert River. The Kirrama National Park is in the north, north-east, east, south-east and south of the locality. The Blencoe Falls are within the south of the locality (18.22417°S 145.5400°E) while the Herbert River Falls are on the boundary of Kirrama and Wairuna to the south (18.23523°S 145.37083°E).

Outside of the national park, the land use is grazing on native vegetation.

== History ==
The locality takes its name from the Kirrama pastoral run in 1870s. The name is thought to be the Indigenous language group name Keremai or Kirimai local to the area.

== Demographics ==
In the 2016 census, Kirrama had a population of 9 people.

In the 2021 census, Kirrama had "no people or a very low population".

== Education ==
There are no schools in Kirrama. The nearest government primary school is Kennedy State School in Kennedy to the east; however, it would be too distant for students in some parts of Kirrama. Also, there are no nearby secondary schools. The alternatives are distance education and boarding school.

== Attractions ==
The Blencoe Falls are on the Wet Tropics Great Walk.
