= Gregory Highway =

State highway in Queensland, Australia

Gregory Highway Gregory Developmental Road Queensland
- Gregory Highway (yellow on black), Gregory Developmental Road (green on black)

General information
- Type: Highway
- Length: 930 km (578 mi)
- Route number(s): No shield; (Kennedy Developmental Road – Conjuboy); State Route 63; (Conjuboy – Charters Towers); State Highway A7; (Charters Towers – Springsure)
- Former route number: National Route 55 (Charters Towers – Springsure)

Major junctions
- North end: Gulf Developmental Road (National Route 1), Mount Surprise, Queensland
- Kennedy Developmental Road (State Route 62); Hervey Range Road (State Route 72); Flinders Highway (State Highway A6); Bowen Developmental Road (State Route 77); Peak Downs Highway (State Route 70); Capricorn Highway (State Highway A4)
- South end: Dawson Highway (State Highway A7), Springsure, Queensland

Location(s)
- Major settlements: Charters Towers, Belyando, Clermont, Emerald

Highway system
- Highways in Australia; National Highway • Freeways in Australia; Highways in Queensland

The Gregory Highway is a state highway in Queensland, Australia that serves the major coal-mining centres of Central Queensland. The highway was named after Augustus Gregory, an early explorer.

== Route description ==
The highway runs southward from Quartz Blow Creek, a point 31 kilometres (19 mi) west of Mount Surprise on the Gulf Developmental Road, via Charters Towers, to Springsure, over 900 kilometres (560 mi) away. The northern section of 756 kilometres (470 mi) is designated by the state government as the Gregory Developmental Road. The shorter southern section between Clermont and Springsure (174 kilometres (108 mi)) is designated the Gregory Highway. As of 2015, the first 120 kilometres (75 mi) between the Gulf Developmental Road via Einasleigh to the Lynd Junction are unsealed and may be corrugated. The next section to Charters Towers has been upgraded from single lane to mostly dual-laned bitumen. The road is used by many road trains.

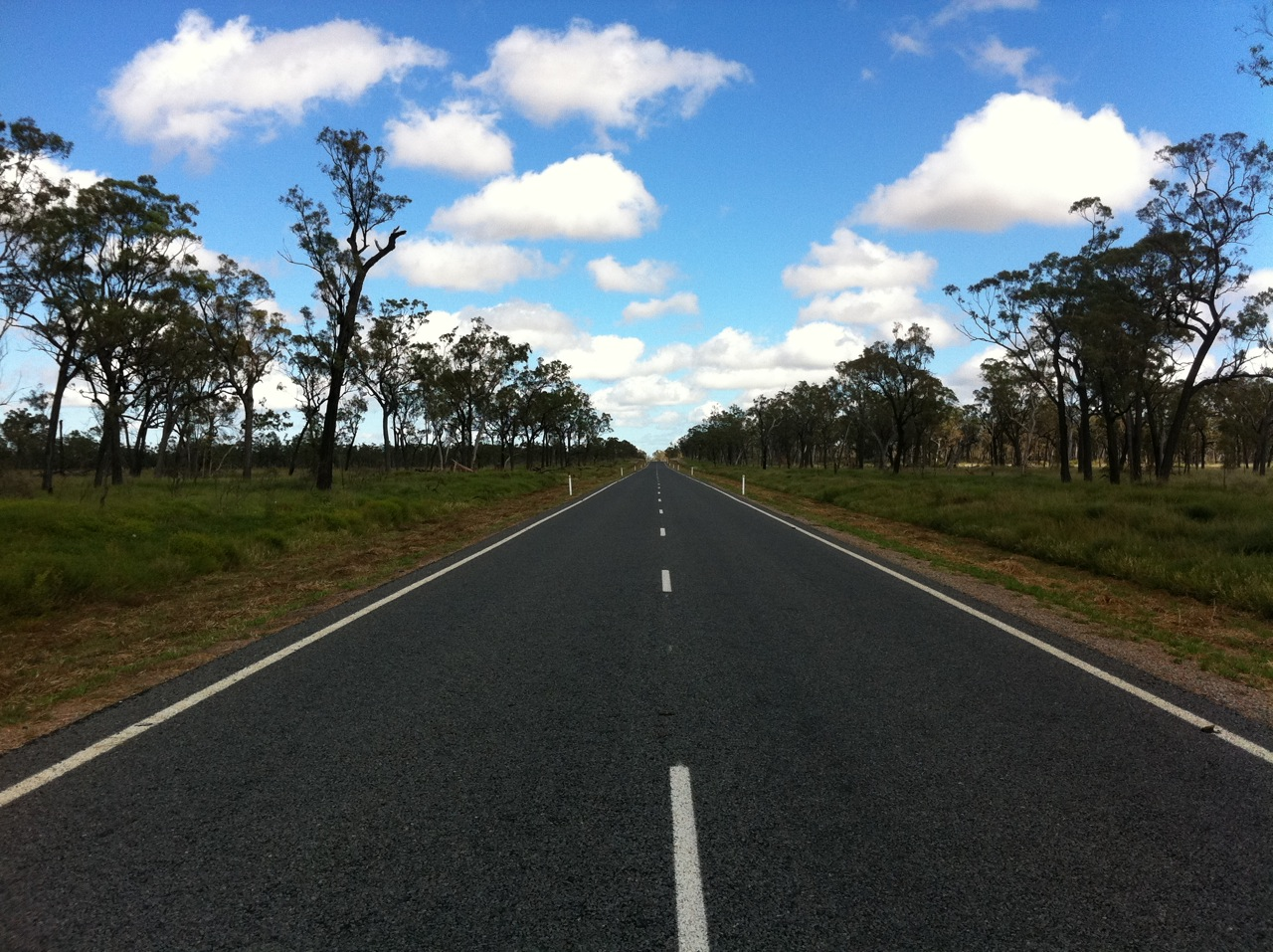
High quality road section

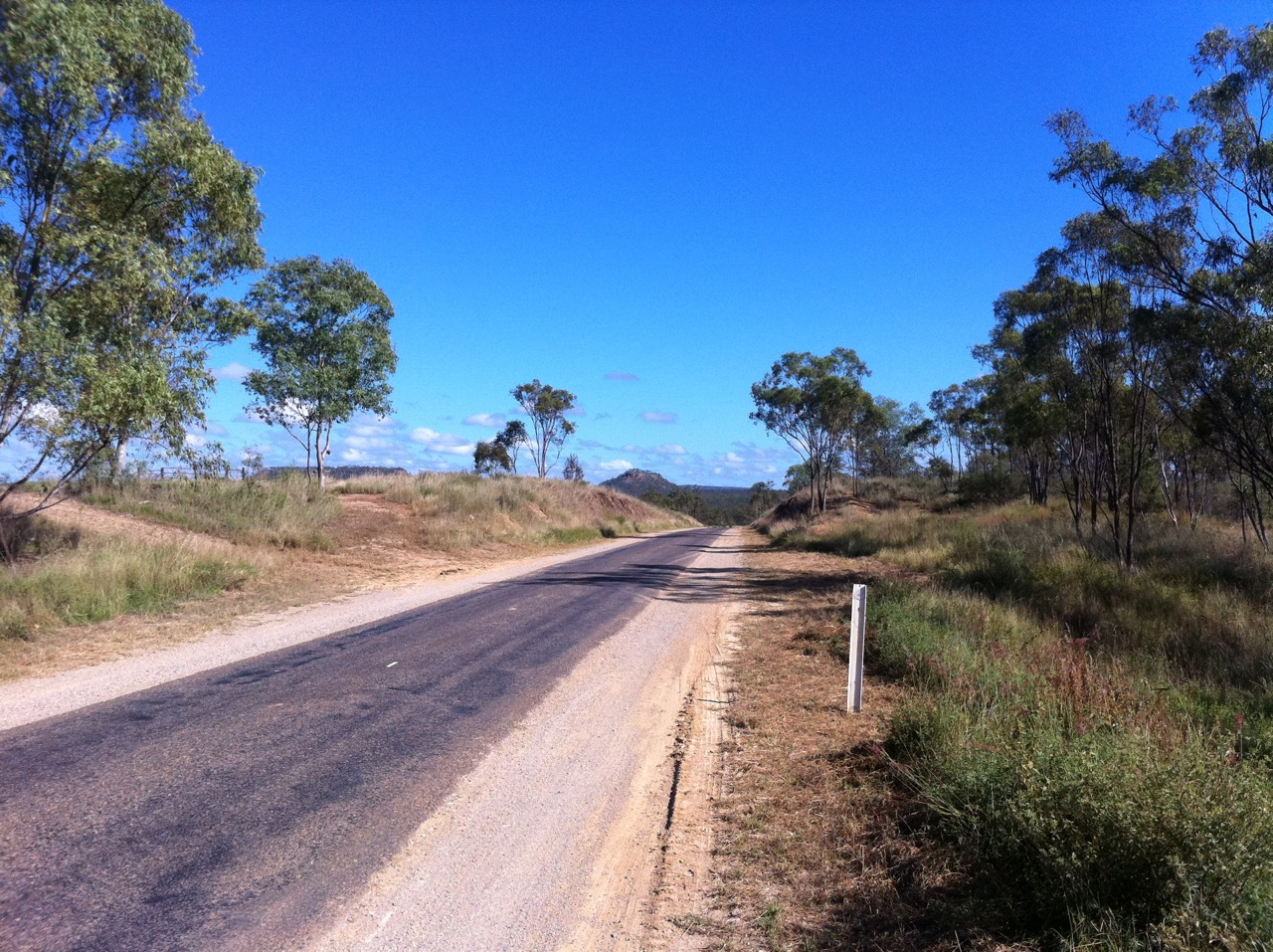
Example of poorer quality road section

== Northern Australia Beef Roads upgrades ==
The Northern Australia Beef Roads Program announced in 2016 included the following project for the Gregory Developmental Road.

=== Road widening ===
The project to widen the road south of Charters Towers is expected to be completed in early 2023 at a total cost of $5.79 million.

== Roads of Strategic Importance upgrades ==
The Roads of Strategic Importance initiative, last updated in March 2022, includes the following projects for the Gregory Highway.

=== Corridor upgrade ===
A lead project to upgrade the Townsville to Roma corridor, including sections of the Carnarvon, Dawson and Gregory Highways and surrounding state and council roads, at an estimated cost of $125 million, commenced construction of some work projects in 2020. Planning continues for other projects.

=== Intersection upgrade Capricorn Highway ===
A project to upgrade the intersection with the Capricorn Highway in Emerald at a cost of $7.9 million is scheduled for completion in mid-2023. This project was targeted for "early works" by the Queensland Government.

=== Pavement strengthening and widening ===
A project to strengthen and widen sections of pavement on the Gregory Developmental Road between Charters Towers and The Lynd at a cost of $15.3 million is planned to be completed in mid-2023. This project is targeted for "early works" by the Queensland Government.

== Other upgrades ==
A project to widen and strengthen 7 kilometres (4.3 mi) of pavement between Marble Creek and Christmas Creek, at a cost of $45.41 million, was due to be completed in late 2023.

A project to upgrade a culvert near Porphyry Road, at a cost of $5,1 million, was due to be completed in late 2023.

== Proposals ==
The Queensland Inland Freight Route is a proposal to upgrade the existing highways from Charters Towers to Mungindi. This would involve significant upgrades to the Gregory Highway between Charters Towers and Springsure.

== List of towns along the Gregory Developmental Road/Highway ==
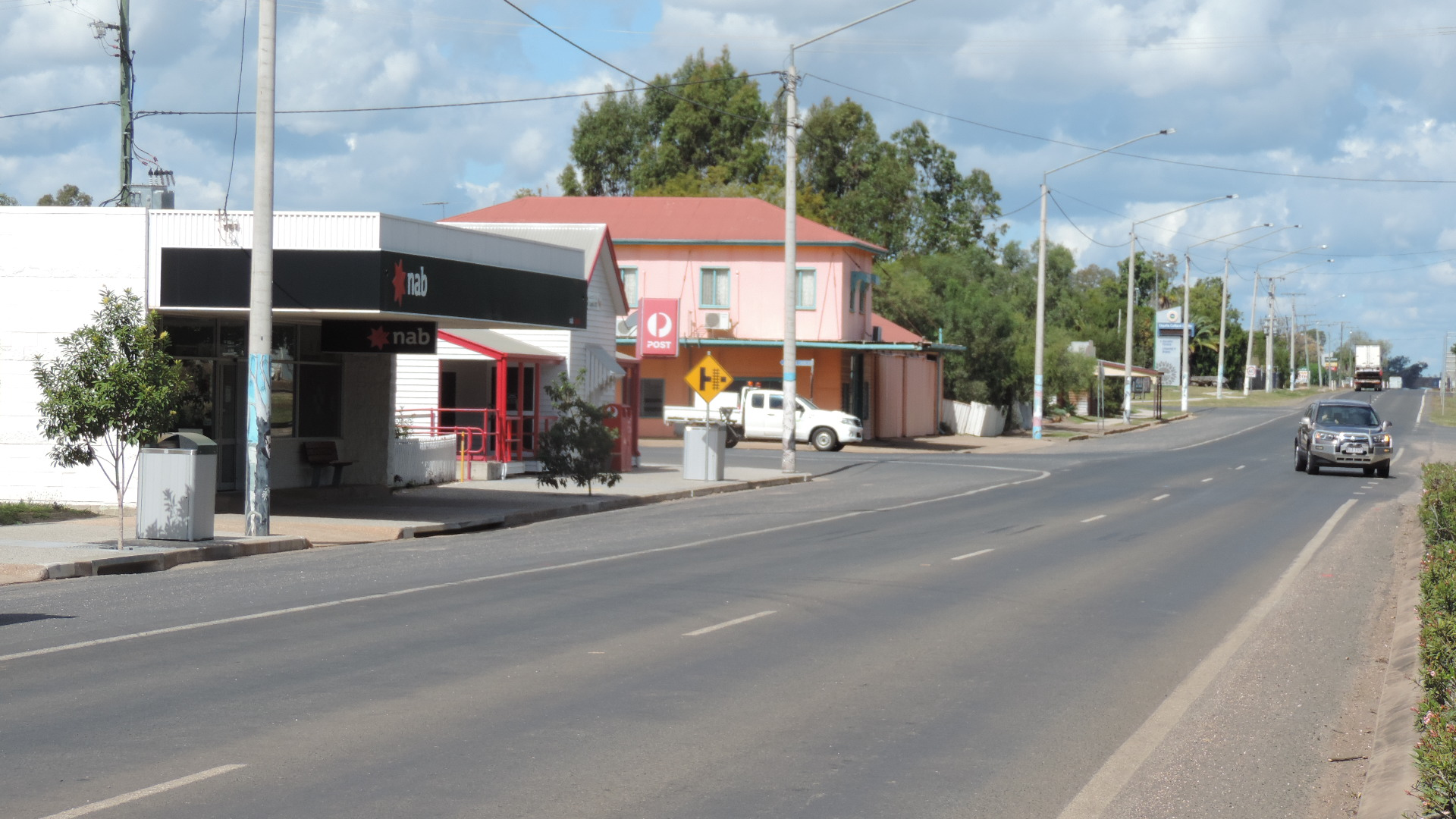
Gregory Highway passes through Capella, 2016

- Mount Surprise
- Einasleigh
- Charters Towers
- Belyando
- Clermont
- Capella
- Emerald
- Springsure

== Major intersections ==
LGA	Location	km	mi	Destinations	Notes
Etheridge	Mount Surprise	0	0.0	Gulf Developmental Road (National Route 1) – west – Georgetown / east – Mount Surprise	Northern end of Gregory Developmental Road (No route number)
Etheridge	Conjuboy	120	75	Kennedy Developmental Road (State Route 62) – west, then south – Hughenden / east – Greenvale	Western concurrency terminus with Kennedy Developmental Road
Etheridge	Conjuboy	123	76	Kennedy Developmental Road (State Route 62) – north – Mount Garnet	Eastern concurrency terminus with Kennedy Developmental Road
Etheridge	Conjuboy	123	76	Kennedy Developmental Road (State Route 62) – north – Mount Garnet	Gregory Developmental Road continues south east as State Route 63
Charters Towers	Basalt	284	176	Hervey Range Road (State Route 72) – east – Hervey Range	
Charters Towers	Charters Towers	382	237	Flinders Highway (State Route A6) – east – Townsville	Northern concurrency terminus with Flinders Highway / Gregory Developmental Road continues south west through Charters Towers
Charters Towers	Black Jack	390	240	Flinders Highway (State Route A6) – west – Pentland	Southern concurrency terminus with Flinders Highway
Charters Towers	Black Jack	390	240	Flinders Highway (State Route A6) – west – Pentland	Gregory Developmental Road continues south as State Route A7.
Isaac	Belyando	588	365	Bowen Developmental Road (State Route 77) – east – Mount Coolon	
Isaac	Clermont	741	460	Peak Downs Highway (State Route 70) – east – Nebo	Northern concurrency terminus with Peak Downs Highway
Isaac	Clermont	755	469	Peak Downs Highway (State Route 70) – south – Clermont	Southern concurrency terminus with Peak Downs Highway / Gregory Highway continues east as State Route A7
Central Highlands	Emerald	862	536	Capricorn Highway (State Route A4) – west – Alpha	Western concurrency terminus with Capricorn Highway
Central Highlands	Emerald	864	537	Capricorn Highway (State Route A4) – east – Blackwater	Eastern concurrency terminus with Capricorn Highway
Central Highlands	Springsure	930	580	Dawson Highway (State Route A7) – south–east – Rolleston	Southern end of Gregory Highway / State Route A7 continues south east as Dawson Highway
1.000 mi = 1.609 km; 1.000 km = 0.621 mi: Concurrency terminus; Route transition

== See also ==
- Highways in Australia
- List of highways in Queensland
