= List of highways in Queensland =

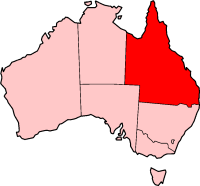
Queensland

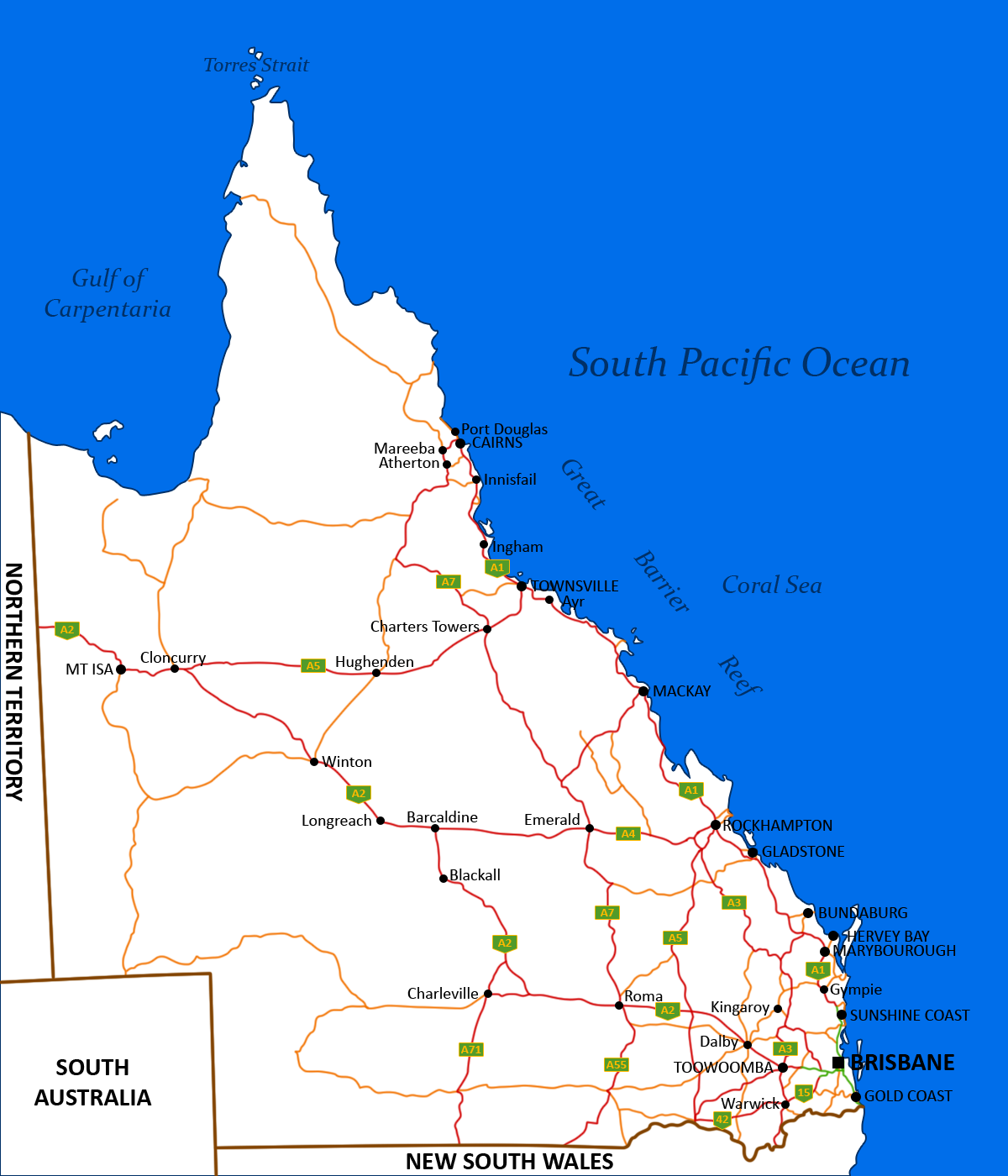
General highways map of Queensland

Queensland, being the second largest (by area) state in Australia, is also the most decentralised. Hence the highways and roads cover most parts of the state unlike the sparsely populated Western Australia. Even Queensland's outback is well served as it is relatively populated.

Road quality varies from 8-laned Pacific Motorway linking Brisbane–Gold Coast to earth-packed outback tracks, reflecting the great diversity of its terrain and climatic conditions. The route markings are also unique in the sense that Queensland uses all available schemes, from old-style National Routes and Highways scheme and the blue-shielded State Routes scheme to the latest alphanumeric numbering scheme and the Metroads metropolitan route numbering scheme.

== National Land Transport Network ==
  - Bruce Highway
  - Gateway Motorway
  - Pacific Motorway
- Bruce Highway
  - Gateway Motorway
  - Ipswich Motorway
  - Logan Motorway
  - Warrego Highway
  - Barkly Highway
  - Landsborough Highway
  - Warrego Highway
- Flinders Highway
- Ipswich Motorway
  - Cunningham Highway
  - New England Highway
- Gore Highway

== State highways ==
  - Captain Cook Highway
  - Gulf Developmental Road
  - Kennedy Highway
  - Savannah Way
- Gold Coast Highway
  - Gympie Arterial Road
  - Pacific Motorway
  - Riverside Expressway
  - Burnett Highway
  - D'Aguilar Highway
  - New England Highway
- Isis Highway
- Scenic Highway (Queensland)
- Port of Brisbane Motorway
- Capricorn Highway
  - Centenary Motorway
  - Legacy Way
  - Western Freeway, Brisbane
- Leichhardt Highway
- David Low Way
  - Carnarvon Highway
  - Dawson Highway
  - Gregory Highway
  - Ipswich Road
- Fitzroy Developmental Road
- Maroochydore Road
- Suttor Developmental Road
- Mount Lindesay Highway
  - Brisbane Valley Highway
  - D'Aguilar Highway
- Palmerston Highway
- Burke Developmental Road
- Mulligan Highway
- Cunningham Highway
- Captain Cook Highway
- Carnarvon Highway
  - Balonne Highway
  - Bunya Highway
  - Moonie Highway
  - Wide Bay Highway
  - Gillies Highway
  - Isis Highway
  - Carnarvon Highway
  - Castlereagh Highway
- Dawson Highway
- Kennedy Developmental Road
- Gregory Developmental Road
- Fitzroy Developmental Road
  - Peak Downs Highway
  - Sunshine Motorway
- Mitchell Highway
- Bowen Developmental Road
  - Mulligan Highway
  - Peninsula Developmental Road
  - Boulia Mount Isa Highway
  - Burke Developmental Road
  - Diamantina Developmental Road
  - Eyre Developmental Road
- Wills Developmental Road
  - Barwon Highway
  - Brisbane Valley Highway
  - D'Aguilar Highway
  - Esk–Hampton Road
  - Gore Highway
  - Leichhardt Highway
  - New England Highway
- D'Aguilar Highway
- – Toowoomba–Athol Road
- No shield
  - Donohue Highway

== Outback track ==
- Bamaga Road (Telegraph Road)
- Birdsville Track

== See also ==
- Highways in Australia for highways in other states and territories
- List of highways in Australia for roads named as highways, and roads that function as highways but are not necessarily classified as highways
- List of road routes in Queensland
