= Munderra, Queensland =

Munderra
- Suburb
- Interactive map of Munderra
- Coordinates: 17.6891°S 144.8605°E
- Country: Australia
- State: Queensland
- LGA: Shire of Mareeba
- Location: 23.1 km (14.4 mi) WNW of Mount Garnet; 68.5 km (42.6 mi) W of Ravenshoe; 152 km (94 mi) SW of Mareeba; 184 km (114 mi) SW of Cairns; 1,748 km (1,086 mi) NNW of Brisbane

Government
  - State electorate: Hill
  - Federal division: Kennedy

Area
  - Total: 314.1 km^{2} (121.3 sq mi)

Population
  - Total: 0 (2021 census)
  - Density: 0.0000/km^{2} (0.000/sq mi)
- Time zone: UTC+10:00 (AEST)
- Postcode: 4872
Suburbs around Munderra
Petford	Petford	Irvinebank
Barwidgi	Munderra	Mount Garnet
Forty Mile	Forty Mile	Gunnawarra

Munderra is a rural locality in the Shire of Mareeba, Queensland, Australia. In the 2021 census, Munderra had "no people or a very low population".

== Geography ==
The Tate River rises in the locality and flows to the west. California Creek, a tributary of the Tate, forms part of the northern boundary. Mount Cardwell is in the locality.

== Demographics ==
In the 2016 census, Munderra had "no people or a very low population".

In the 2021 census, Munderra had "no people or a very low population".

== Education ==
There are no schools in Munderra. The nearest government primary school is Mount Garnet State School in neighbouring Mount Garnet to the east. There are no secondary schools nearby; the alternatives are distance education and boarding school.
