= Innot Hot Springs =

- Town
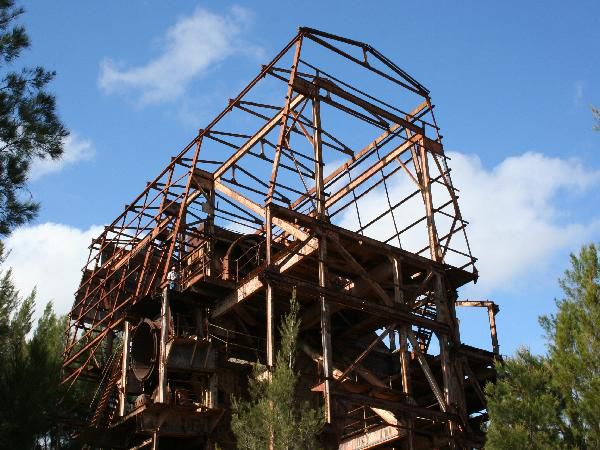
- Nettle Creek Tin Dredge at Innot Hot Springs, 2009

- Interactive map of Innot Hot Springs
- Coordinates: 17.6659°S 145.2405°E
- Country: Australia
- State: Queensland
- LGA: Tablelands Region
- Location: 15.7 km (9.8 mi) E of Mount Garnet; 30.0 km (18.6 mi) WSW of Ravenshoe; 80.0 km (49.7 mi) SW of Atherton; 145 km (90 mi) SW of Cairns; 1,744 km (1,084 mi) NNW of Brisbane

Government
  - State electorate: Hill
  - Federal division: Kennedy

Area
  - Total: 697.8 km^{2} (269.4 sq mi)

Population
  - Total: 189 (2021 census)
  - Density: 0.2709/km^{2} (0.7015/sq mi)
- Time zone: UTC+10:00 (AEST)
- Postcode: 4872
Localities around Innot Hot Springs
Mount Garnet	Silver Valley	Millstream
Gunnawarra	Innot Hot Springs	Koombooloomba
Gunnawarra	Glen Ruth	Glen Ruth

Innot Hot Springs is a rural town and locality in the Tablelands Region, Queensland, Australia. In the 2021 census, the locality of Innot Hot Springs had a population of 189 people.

== Geography ==
Innot Hot Springs is 153 kilometres (95 mi) south-west of Cairns via the Bruce Highway, Gillies Range Road, Lake Barrine Road, State Route 25, State Route 24 and the Kennedy Highway. From further west it can be accessed via the Kennedy Highway.

Innot Hot Springs is located on the Kennedy Highway, between Mount Garnet and Ravenshoe in Far North Queensland. It is 5 kilometers south of Mount Gibson. The town is on the northern edge of the locality with the Kennedy Highway passing through it.

The Herbert River meanders in a southerly direction through the locality from Millstream to Gunnawarra and Glen Ruth. The confluence of the Wild River with the Herbert River occurs in the north of the locality (east of the town). Nettle Creek flows from Silver Valley to the north through the town and joins the Herbert River to the south of the town.

The town was established around three hot mineral springs in the Nettle Creek near the town. The temperature of the springs is between 74 and 85 °C (165 and 185 °F).

== Aboriginal legend ==
According to the Mamu people, the springs were created in the Dreamtime when a large maritime turtle had a hot stone put in her stomach. It hurried out of the sea inland, to this spot, to warm the waters. From that day onwards, it ordered all big turtles were to stay in the sea, while small tortoises would be permitted to live in the freshwater rivers on land.

== History ==
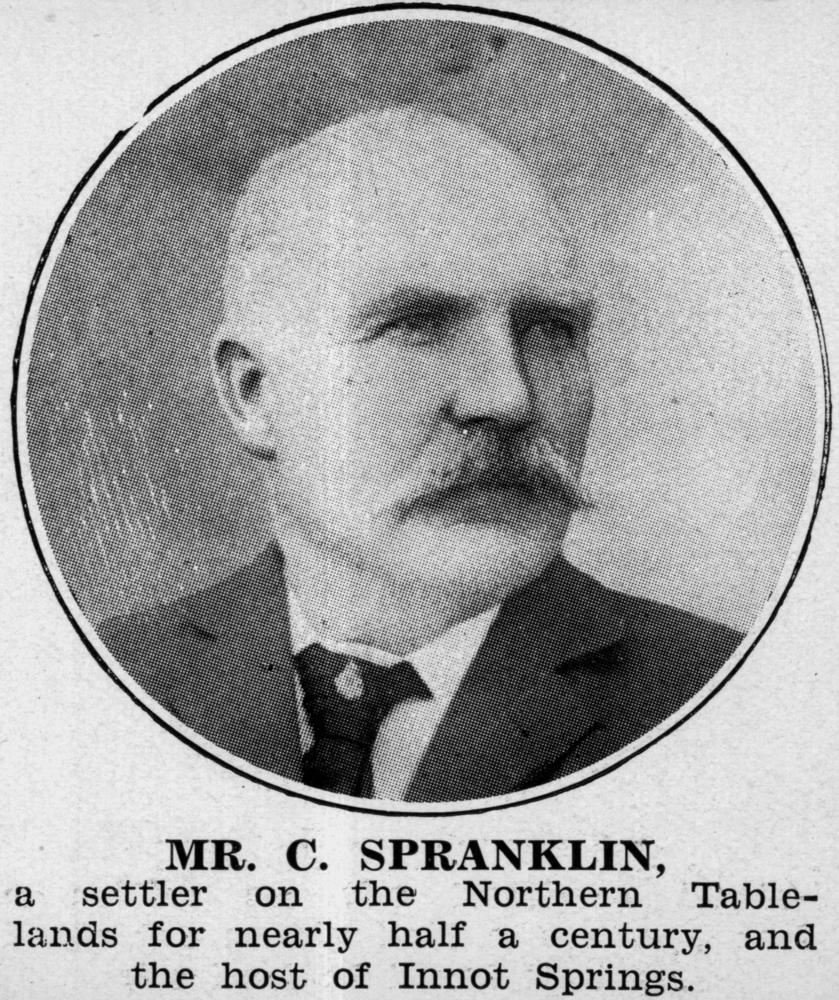
"Mr C. Spranklin, a settler on the Northern Tablelands for nearly half a century, and the host of Innot Springs"

The hot springs were explored by Europeans in the early 1870s when John Atherton was exploring the area for grazing opportunities. However it seems the springs were ignored until 1885 when Charles Overend Garbutt, the owner of Woodleigh Station, rediscovered them and learned from the local Aboriginal people that the springs had healing properties. In the Victorian era, mineral springs were widely believed to have therapeutic benefits obtained through bathing in the water and drinking the water. Perceiving the commercial opportunities, a Russian-born man, Antonie Antonevic leased 10 acres around the springs on 1 April 1886. The lease passed through a number of people's hands before it was taken up by (Neil) Charles Spranklin in the late 1890s, who is generally regarded as the major force in developing the springs.

By July 1888 there was a two-storey house with bathing sheds by the springs and in February 1891, the leaseholder Henry Faasch was described as being able to accommodate only 12 patients, but was in the process of erecting a hotel. As the water in the springs was too hot for bathing, the hot spring water was piped into bath tubs at 6am each morning and left it to cool until late morning when the guests could comfortably bathe in it. In 1900, Spranklin built four new bathrooms described as "a much needed improvement".

In the 1900s, Spranklin established a cordial factory where he bottled water from the springs and shipped it to Europe as a health treatment. In 1912 it was proposed that the hot springs were one of three "beauty spots" in the Cairns hinterland that must be preserved; this was prior to legislation to create national parks in Queensland. On 7 October 1918, when Spranklin was absent from the hotel, a fire broke out. The maid Nellie Hogg (Spanklin's step-daughter) initially fought the fire using water from jugs and then, with the help of others, managed to save the hotel, although there was £50 worth of repairs required. On 13 March 1929 Charles Spranklin died aged 75 years in the hospital at Herberton following a 12-month illness. He was buried in Herberton Cemetery on 14 March 1929. In July 1930 James Thomas Spranklin (son of Charles) announced he would take over the hotel, but he died in January 1931. Later that month, Jack and Mabel McBride became the owners of the Springs Hotel.

Lower Nettles Provisional School opened circa July 1911. In July 1916 it became a half-time school in conjunction with Coolgarra State School, meaning the two schools shared a single teacher. It closed later in 1916.

Innot Hot Springs State School opened on 1 June 1940 and closed on 30 June 1957 due to declining enrolments. It was at approx 16018 Kennedy Highway (17.6659°S 145.2386°E).

== Demographics ==
In the 2016 census, the locality of Innot Hot Springs had a population of 177 people.

In the 2021 census, the locality of Innot Hot Springs had a population of 189 people.

== Heritage listings ==
Innot Hot Springs has a number of heritage-listed sites, including:

- Nettle Creek (17.7156°S 145.2415°E): Nettle Creek Tin Dredge

== Education ==
There are no schools in Innot Hot Springs. The nearest government primary schools are Mount Garnet State School in neighbouring Mount Garnet to the north-west and Ravenshoe State School (Junior Campus) in Ravenshoe to the north-east. The nearest government secondary school is Ravenshoe State School (Senior Campus) in Ravenshoe. However, students in the southern parts of Innot Hot Springs would be too distant to access these schools; the alternatives are distance education and boarding school.

== Attractions ==
The hot springs are open to the public.
