= Conjuboy, Queensland =

Conjuboy
- Suburb
- Interactive map of Conjuboy
- Coordinates: 18.7195°S 144.6019°E
- Country: Australia
- State: Queensland
- LGA: Shire of Etheridge
- Location: 73.5 km (45.7 mi) NW of Greenvale; 76.3 km (47.4 mi) SSE of Mount Surprise; 215 km (134 mi) ESE of Georgetown; 324 km (201 mi) WNW of Townsville; 1,586 km (985 mi) NNW of Brisbane

Government
  - State electorate: Traeger
  - Federal division: Kennedy

Area
  - Total: 1,663.8 km^{2} (642.4 sq mi)

Population
  - Total: 0 (2021 census)
  - Density: 0.00000/km^{2} (0.0000/sq mi)
- Time zone: UTC+10:00 (AEST)
- Postcode: 4871
Suburbs around Conjuboy
Einasleigh	Mount Surprise	Greenvale
Einasleigh	Conjuboy	Greenvale
Lyndhurst	Greenvale	Greenvale

Conjuboy is a remote rural locality in the Shire of Etheridge, Queensland, Australia. In the 2021 census, Conjuboy had "no people or a very low population".

== Geography ==
The Gregory Developmental Road passes through the locality from the south-west to the south-east, while the Kennedy Developmental Road passes through the locality from the east to the south; they intersect in the south of the locality.

The ridge of the Great Dividing Range runs from north to south through Conjuboy creating a watershed. Dry River rises in the east of the locality and flows into the Herbert River and ultimately into the Ross River towards the Coral Sea. Spring Creek rises in the north-west of the locality and flows into the Einasleigh River and ultimately into the Gilbert River into the Gulf of Carpentaria.

The predominant land use is grazing on native vegetation.

== History ==
The locality was officially named and bounded on 23 June 2000; however the name has been in use as a pastoral station since at least 1934 when it was operated by Arthur Darcy Wilson.

== Demographics ==
In the 2016 census, Conjuboy had "no people or a very low population".

In the 2021 census, Conjuboy had "no people or a very low population".

== Education ==
There are no schools in Conjuboy. The nearest government primary schools are Greenvale State School in neighbouring Greenvale to the south-east and Mount Surprise State School in neighbouring Mount Surprise to the north-west. There are no secondary schools near Conjuboy; distance education and boarding schools are the alternatives.
