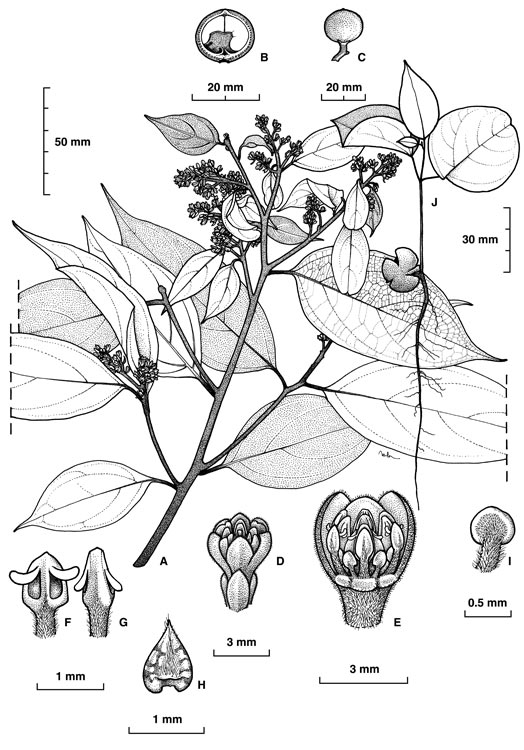

Conservation status
- Least Concern (IUCN 3.1)

Scientific classification
- Kingdom: Plantae
- Clade: Tracheophytes
- Clade: Angiosperms
- Clade: Magnoliids
- Order: Laurales
- Family: Lauraceae
- Genus: Cryptocarya
- Species: C. cocosoides

Binomial name
- Cryptocarya cocosoides B.Hyland

= Cryptocarya cocosoides =

Species of tree

Cryptocarya cocosoides, commonly known as coconut laurel, is a tree in the laurel family and is endemic to north Queensland. Its leaves are lance-shaped to elliptic, the flowers creamy-green, perfumed and tube-shaped, and the fruit a spherical black to purple drupe.

== Description ==
Cryptocarya cocosoides is a tree that typically grows to a height of 30 m (98 ft), its stems usually buttressed and its twigs densely covered with twisted brown hairs. Its leaves are lance-shaped to elliptic, 73–150 mm (2.9–5.9 in) long and 25–55 mm (0.98–2.17 in) wide on a petiole 8–17 mm (0.31–0.67 in) long. The flowers are arranged in panicles more or less longer than the leaves and are perfumed, the perianth 1.2–2.9 mm (0.047–0.114 in) long and 1.7–2 mm (0.067–0.079 in) wide and more or less glabrous. The outer tepals are 1.8–2.5 mm (0.071–0.098 in) long and 1.4–1.7 mm (0.055–0.067 in) wide and the inner tepals are 1.6–2.3 mm (0.063–0.091 in) long and 1.3–1.6 mm (0.051–0.063 in) wide. The outer anthers 0.6–0.9 mm (0.024–0.035 in) long and 0.6–0.8 mm (0.024–0.031 in) wide, the inner anthers 0.7–1.0 mm (0.028–0.039 in) long and 0.5–0.6 mm (0.020–0.024 in) wide and hairy. Flowering occurs from January to February, and the fruit is spherical or depressed spherical black to purple drupe 14–15 mm (0.55–0.59 in) long and 16–17 mm (0.63–0.67 in) wide.

== Taxonomy ==
Cryptocarya cocosoides was first formally described in 1989 by Bernard Hyland in Australian Systematic Botany from specimens collected by Bruce Gray in 1977.

== Distribution and habitat ==
This species of Cryptocarya grows in mountain rainforest at altitudes between 750 and 1,150 m (2,460 and 3,770 ft) on soils derived from granite between the Tinaroo Hills the Lamb Range and Koombooloomba in North Queensland.
