= Glen Ruth, Queensland =

Glen Ruth
- Suburb
- Interactive map of Glen Ruth
- Coordinates: 18.0063°S 145.4113°E
- Country: Australia
- State: Queensland
- LGA: Tablelands Region
- Location: 104 km (65 mi) WNW of Cardwell; 136 km (85 mi) S of Ravenshoe; 186 km (116 mi) S of Atherton; 251 km (156 mi) SW of Cairns; 1,625 km (1,010 mi) NNW of Brisbane

Government
  - State electorate: Hill
  - Federal division: Kennedy

Area
  - Total: 756.9 km^{2} (292.2 sq mi)

Population
  - Total: 0 (2021 census)
  - Density: 0.0000/km^{2} (0.0000/sq mi)
- Time zone: UTC+10:00 (AEST)
- Postcode: 4872
Suburbs around Glen Ruth
Gunnawarra	Innot Hot Springs	Koombooloomba
Gunnawarra	Glen Ruth	Koombooloomba
Minnamoolka	Kirrama	Kirrama

Glen Ruth is a rural locality in the Tablelands Region, Queensland, Australia. In the 2021 census, Glen Ruth had "no people or a very low population".

== Geography ==
The Herbert River forms most of the western boundary.

Glen Ruth has the following mountains (from north to south):

- Tiger Hill (18.0251°S 145.4462°E) 867 metres (2,844 ft)
- Mount Cameron (18.0618°S 145.5204°E) 852 metres (2,795 ft)
- Mount Sharples (18.1221°S 145.4412°E) 810 metres (2,660 ft)

The land use is grazing on native vegetation.

== Demographics ==
In the 2016 census, Glen Ruth had "no people or a very low population".

In the 2021 census, Glen Ruth had "no people or a very low population".

== Education ==
There are no schools in Glen Ruth, nor nearby. The alternatives are distance education and boarding school.
