= Amblymoropsis =

Scientific classification
- Kingdom: Animalia
- Phylum: Arthropoda
- Class: Insecta
- Order: Coleoptera
- Suborder: Polyphaga
- Infraorder: Cucujiformia
- Family: Cerambycidae
- Tribe: Desmiphorini
- Genus: Amblymoropsis; Breuning, 1958

Synonyms
- Setosophroniella Breuning, 1958

Genus of beetles

Amblymoropsis is a genus of beetles in the family Cerambycidae. It was described by Stephan von Breuning in 1958.

== Species ==
Amblymoropsis contains the following species:

- Amblymoropsis australica (Breuning, 1963)
- Amblymoropsis fusca Breuning, 1958
- Amblymoropsis papuana (Breuning, 1961)
- Amblymoropsis rufa (Breuning, 1970)
