= Koombooloomba, Queensland =

Koombooloomba
- Town
- Interactive map of Koombooloomba
- Coordinates: 17.8277°S 145.5486°E
- Country: Australia
- State: Queensland
- LGA: Tablelands Region
- Location: 21.7 km (13.5 mi) SSW of Ravenshoe; 72.2 km (44.9 mi) S of Atherton; 105 km (65 mi) WSW of Innisfail; 137 km (85 mi) SW of Cairns; 1,710 km (1,060 mi) NNW of Brisbane

Government
  - State electorate: Dalrymple
  - Federal division: Kennedy

Area
  - Total: 757.8 km^{2} (292.6 sq mi)

Population
  - Total: 0 (2021 census)
  - Density: 0.0000/km^{2} (0.0000/sq mi)
- Time zone: UTC+10:00 (AEST)
- Postcode: 4872
Localities around Koombooloomba
Millstream	Ravenshoe; Maalan	Palmerston; Gulngai
Innot Hot Springs	Koombooloomba	Cardstone; Walter Hill
Glen Ruth	Kirrama	Kooroomool

Koombooloomba is a rural locality in the Tablelands Region, Queensland, Australia. In the 2021 census, the locality of Koombooloomba had "no people or a very low population".

The locality was used during the construction of the Kareeya Hydro Power Station.

== Geography ==
The Koombooloomba Dam is a concrete gravity dam with a controlled spillway across the Tully River. Built for the purpose of hydroelectric power generation, the dam creates the reservoir, Lake Koombooloomba, which supplies water to the Kareeya Hydro Power Station which is downstream in neighbouring Cardstone to the east.

The northern, eastern, and southern parts of the locality are protected areas within the Tully Falls National Park, the Koombooloomba National Park, the Ravenshoe Forest Reserve, and the Koombooloomba South Forest Reserve. The west of the locality is used for grazing on native vegetation.

== History ==
The village of Koombooloomba was built to accommodate the workers on the Koombooloomba Dam. The timber for the village was cut from trees that would be submerged by the dam.

Koombooloomba State School opened on 19 February 1953 and closed in 1963.

Koombooloomba Post Office opened about December 1952 and closed about 1963.

== Demographics ==
In the 2016 census, Koombooloomba had "no people or a very low population".

In the 2021 census, the locality of Koombooloomba had "no people or a very low population".
