= Amblymoropsis papuana =

Scientific classification
- Kingdom: Animalia
- Phylum: Arthropoda
- Class: Insecta
- Order: Coleoptera
- Suborder: Polyphaga
- Infraorder: Cucujiformia
- Family: Cerambycidae
- Genus: Amblymoropsis
- Species: A. papuana

Binomial name
- Amblymoropsis papuana (Breuning, 1961)

Species of beetle

Amblymoropsis papuana is a species of beetle in the family Cerambycidae. It was described by Stephan von Breuning (entomologist) in 1961.
