= Northern Australia Beef Roads Program =

Australian Government infrastructure program

Northern Australia Beef Roads Program is a suite of projects designed to deliver targeted upgrades to key roads for transporting cattle in northern Australia. In 2016 the Australian Government announced 18 projects to be funded under this program. This program is separate to the Northern Australia Roads Program, also announced in 2016, which contains a further 20 projects.

== Funding and program status ==
Funding by the Australian Government is up to 80% of total costs, with the remainder being met by state, territory and local governments. The initial funding allocation by the Australian Government was $100 million, most of which, As of April 2022, has been expended on the identified projects, most of which have been completed or are nearing completion.

The CSIRO (Commonwealth Scientific and Industrial Research Organisation) developed a computer program called Transport Network Strategic Investment Tool (TRANSIT) to help identify ways to reduce travel distance and time, save fuel costs, cut down on wear and tear and minimise stress for truck drivers and cattle.

== Type of work ==
The work undertaken includes road widening, sealing and pavement renewal.

== Projects ==
The roads involved in the 18 projects are listed below.

=== Queensland ===
- Road network, Rockhampton, covering parts of:
  - Capricorn Highway
  - Bruce Highway
  - Rockhampton-Yeppoon Road (Yaamba Road, Musgrave Street, Queen Elizabeth Drive)
  - Rockhampton-Emu Park Road (Bridge Street, Lakes Creek Road, Emu Park Road)
- Burke Developmental Road (two projects)
- Clermont-Alpha Road (three projects)
- Ootann Road (two projects)
- Gregory Developmental Road
- Richmond-Croydon Road (two projects)
- Cloncurry-Dajarra Road
- Diamantina Developmental Road
- Richmond-Winton Road (two projects)

=== Northern Territory ===
- Barkly Stock Route
- Tablelands Highway

=== Western Australia ===
- Great Northern Highway

== White Paper on Developing Northern Australia ==
The Northern Australia Beef Roads Program is part of the White Paper on Developing Northern Australia, a $600 million commitment to upgrade high priority roads in northern Australia.

== Parliamentary report ==
The Parliament of Australia has produced a report on transport infrastructure that includes extensive details of the Northern Australia Beef Roads Program, among others.

== See also ==
- Northern Australia
- Road transport in Australia
