= Gunnawarra Homestead =

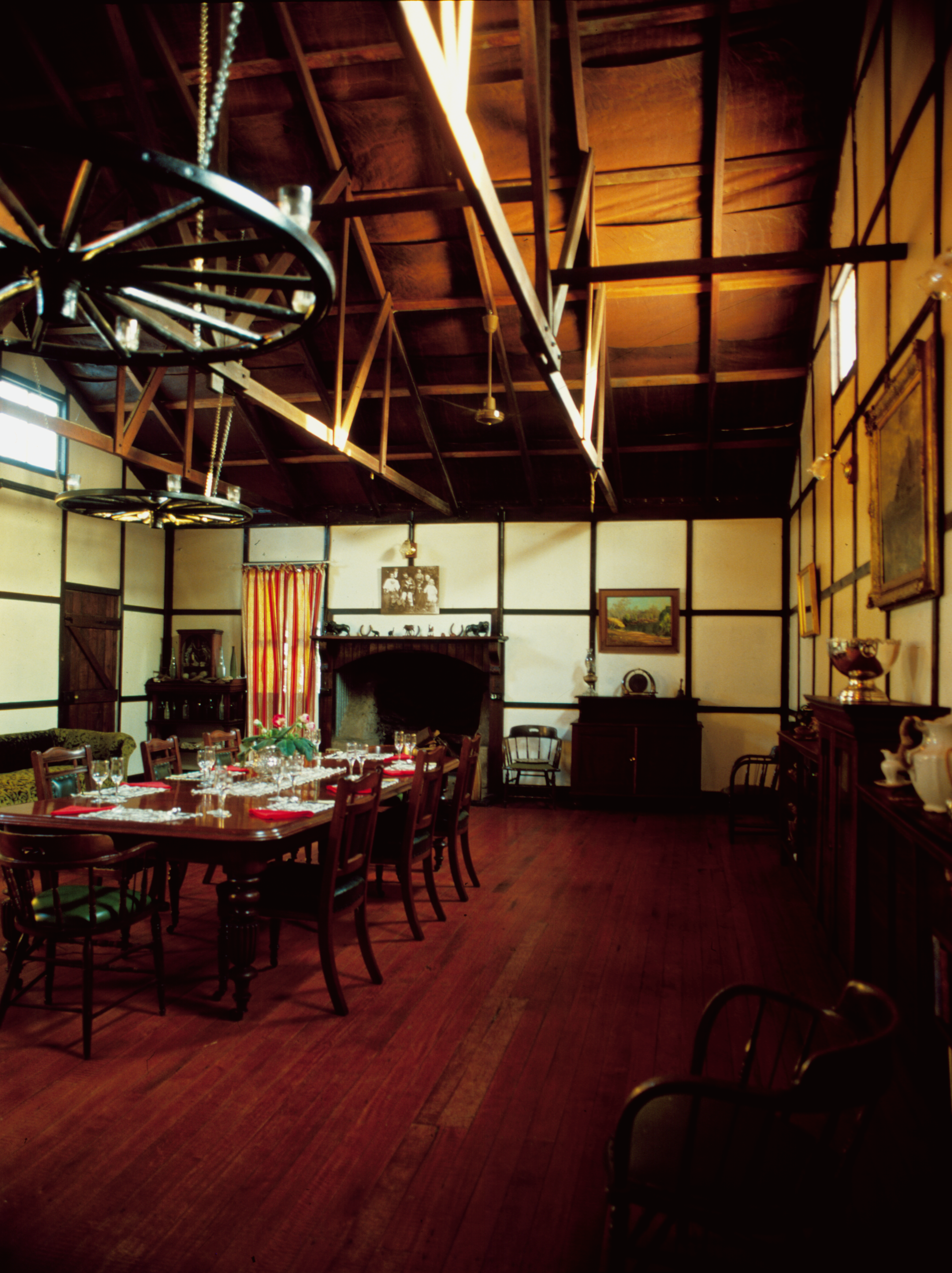
- Interior view of the dining room at Gunnawarra Homestead, 1986

- Location within Queensland Location within Australia
- 17.9366°S 145.1651°E
- Location: Gunnawarra Road, Gunnawarra, Tablelands Region, Queensland, Australia

History
- Design period: 1870s–1890s (late 19th century)
- Built: 1878–1908

Queensland Heritage Register
- Official name: Gunnawarra Homestead
- Type: state heritage (landscape, built)
- Designated: 21 October 1992
- Reference no.: 600544
- Significant period: 1860s–1880s (historical); 1870s–1910s (fabric)
- Significant components: out building/s, residential accommodation – main house, yards – livestock, garden/grounds, graveyard, chimney/chimney stack, residential accommodation – staff quarters, shed/s

Gunnawarra Homestead is a heritage-listed homestead at Gunnawarra Road, Gunnawarra, Tablelands Region, Queensland, Australia. It was built from 1878 to 1908. It was added to the Queensland Heritage Register on 21 October 1992.

== History ==
Gunnawarra is a pastoral property first occupied by Europeans in 1865 and was an outlying part of the Valley of Lagoons run on the Upper Burdekin River, established in 1863.

Ludwig Leichhardt discovered and named the Valley of Lagoons in 1845. George Dalrymple was appointed the first Commissioner of Crown Lands for the Kennedy district in 1861. He had arrived in Australia in the late 1850s, hoping to take up land on the Darling Downs. However, this proved unsuccessful and he travelled north. He chose a well-watered block in the Valley of Lagoons and set up a partnership with brothers Arthur and Walter Scott and Robert Herbert in 1863. In 1864 Dalrymple and Arthur Scott travelled to the area and blazed a trail from what was to be the port of Cardwell to the Valley of Lagoons. The Scott brothers ran the property and soon afterwards Dalrymple relinquished his interest in the run to enter politics.

Gunnawarra was originally a run of 100 square miles and was occupied from 10 April 1865. Following the Pastoral Leases Act of 1869, the run was consolidated and included the blocks of Gunnawarra, Barcoo 1, 2 and 3, Froyle, Tempe, Tempe North, Tempe West, Forrest and Borderland. It then covered an area of 555 square miles and was leased by the partnership of Dangar, Bell, Bell and Ewan. Other outlying blocks of the Valley of Lagoons were formed as the stations of Cashmere and Greenvale. In 1878 the station appeared in the Post Office Directory as "Gunniawarra", said to mean "little house". Later the name was amended to Gunna-Warra and then Gunnawarra in 1890. The first buildings erected at Gunnawarra were of slab construction and included a saddle shed and adjoining quarters. The earliest section of the homestead building was constructed in 1878 and is located on Bell's Creek, a tributary of the Herbert River. Jack Broad, who also built Kirrama homestead, constructed it of slabs with locally cut cypress pine for the uprights and rafters; stringy bark was carted from over twenty miles away for the shingles and hand adzed slabs. The floor was of rammed antbed.

Gunnawarra was divided into two sections following the Crown Lands Act of 1884, becoming Gunnawarra and Forrest. James Ewan purchased Gunnawarra at auction in September 1887. He held it until his death over twenty years later, when it passed to his wife and trustees. On 9 March 1904, it was sold to a partnership of the three Atkinson brothers, Henry John Atkinson of Greenvale, Robert James Atkinson of Cashmere and Thomas Joseph Good Atkinson of Kangaroo Hills.

In 1862 their parents, James and Kate Atkinson, were part of a small group of prospective settlers who arrived in the area. They had previous pastoral experience in Victoria and took up land at Mount Surprise in partnership with Ezra Firth. After a few years, the partnership was dissolved and in 1870 Atkinson took up Farnham station at the site of Ingham. In 1880 he purchased Wairuna and about 5,000 acres (2,000 ha) from the Valley of Lagoons as Abergowrie. Thomas Atkinson married in 1901 and in 1904 brought his wife, Jessie Glennie Godschall, known as Glen, and their baby daughter to live at Gunnawarra. In 1908 they added a bedroom wing of tongue and groove cedar to the house and clad the shingled roof with corrugated iron. In 1913, the buildings of the property were reported to be a house, kitchen, outbuildings, stockyard, horse and milking yards, assessed at £125 in value.

Parts of Gunnawarra were resumed for grazing selections in 1914. In 1922, the brothers' partnership was dissolved and in 1924 the lease for Gunnawarra was transferred into the name of Thomas Atkinson alone. In 1929, when the lease expired, various parties made enquiries to the Lands Department regarding further resumptions for selection. An inspection was made in 1930 and on the recommendation of the Beef Cattle Commission the lease was extended on the grounds that previous resumptions had failed and been sold back to the Atkinson family by the selectors. The area covered by the Gunnawarra lease was then 245 square miles. In 1930, the Gunnawarra Pastoral Company held numerous leases and was composed of Thomas Atkinson, his wife and other family members. After he died on 14 June of that year, Glen Atkinson ran Gunnawarra. Picnic races had been held at Gunnawarra in Ewan's time but were discontinued when he died. In 1918 R.L. Atkinson, a nephew, decided to form a race club using the old course, about 5 miles (8.0 km) from the homestead. Several surrounding stations agreed to participate and a Gunnawarra Picnic Hack Race Meeting was registered for New Year's Day, 1919 followed by a ball at the homestead. After a few years of running this event annually, a concrete slab was laid down at the racetrack for the purpose of dancing as most participants camped at the course. The large room added to the homestead in 1928 is said to have also been used as a ballroom for these races. The races were discontinued after Tom Atkinson's death in June 1930.

In 1933 a small house was constructed close to the lagoon some 3 kilometres (1.9 mi) north of the homestead complex. It was built using traditional techniques and local materials by local aboriginal people and station hands. It was intended for use by senior station employees such as the head stockman and later the bookkeeper.

In 1938, 324 acres (131 ha) of Gunnawarra were resumed for the highway, leaving 224 square miles (580 km^{2}).

Various alterations to the homestead were undertaken in the 1950s and 60s, including the lining of the interior with masonite, the replacement of verandah boards, the addition of concrete floors and inserting a skylight in the roof. New structures have also been added and a new ranch style homestead, a swimming pool and tennis court were probably also constructed in this period.

The homestead took farm-stay guests in the 1980s, but has not been used for this purpose for some years. Gunnawarra continues as a working cattle property and is still owned by members of the Atkinson family.

== Description ==
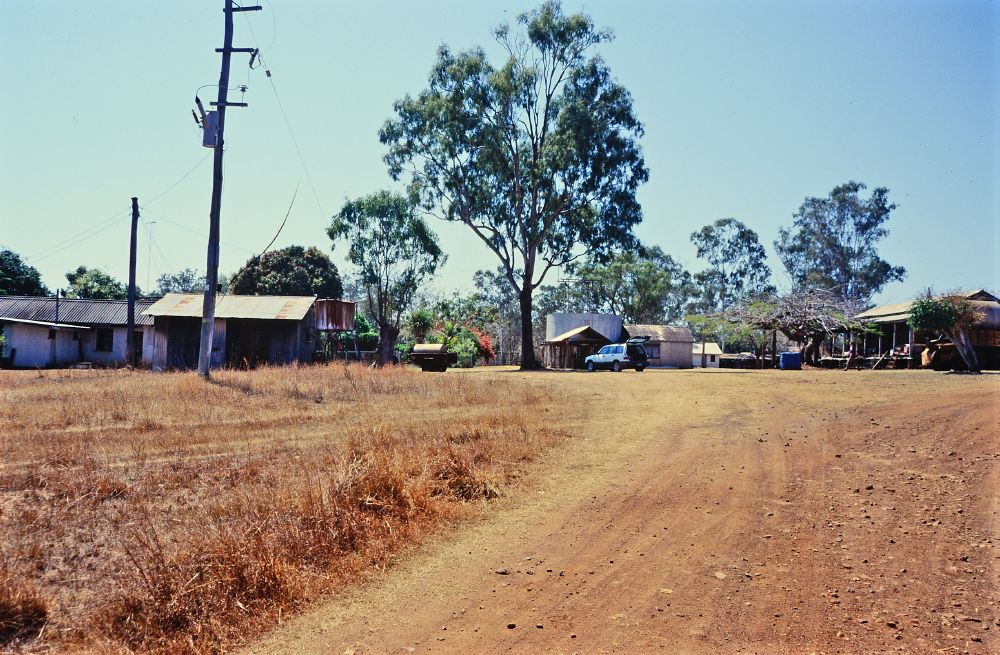
Gunnawarra Homestead from the west, 2001

The buildings on Gunnawarra form a complex of accommodation and support buildings around the 1878 homestead. There are also service buildings, sheds and yards. Approximately 3 kilometres (1.9 mi) north of the main complex is a lagoon and adjacent building known as the Lagoon House.

Entering the main homestead area, to the right there is a rectangular timber building set on stumps. It has a corrugated iron roof and a verandah runs along the front with doors leading onto it. Set at right angles to this building at the rear is a small building clad with corrugated iron. A large corrugated iron clad shed is beyond these buildings.

To the left of the entrance are a small corrugated iron shed and an accommodation block clad in fibrous cement sheeting. The homestead buildings are separated from the working buildings of the complex by a mesh fence enclosing a grassed area. A corrugated iron tank on stumps and some small sheds are between the working buildings and the main house gate.

The early homestead is constructed of horizontal split logs held between uprights by cover strips. Its gabled roof is clad in corrugated iron over shingles which can be seen under the awnings to the verandah which runs around three sides of the building and is supported on timber posts. Adjoining this building is the 1928 addition; a corrugated iron clad structure with a rectangular chimney clad in corrugated iron and sheet metal. The interior is a single room clad in fibrous cement and is currently formal dining room. Three timber trusses support the gabled roof and the floor is timber. The large fireplace is timber and is lined with bricks and concrete. To the rear of these buildings is a wing containing a drawing room with a dining alcove and a modern kitchen. Sliding doors open from this onto an outdoor living area which is shaded by an extension of the roof. Across the open area from the living room wing is a mid 30th century ranch style house.

To the rear of the complex are two cottages, possibly staff accommodation, and wire enclosures for hand fed animals. There is also a tennis court and tiled swimming pool close to the ranch style building, currently the main dwelling.

There is a small cemetery about 500 metres (1,600 ft) from the house. It is encircled by a mesh fence and contains family graves, including that of Kate Atkinson who died in 1917 aged 93, and has continued in use to the present.

Approximately 3 kilometres (1.9 mi) north of the main homestead complex is the Lagoon House, named for its proximity to a long narrow lagoon running parallel to Rudd's Creek. It is a well-made building of local materials utilising traditional construction techniques. The house is L shaped in plan and has a pole frame and a gabled roof clad with corrugated iron. An awning supported on timber posts runs around 3 sides of the main living area. The external walls are built of volcanic rocks to sill height, with bark sheeting above. Internal walls are of slab and corrugated iron. Shutters hinged from above close window openings. The floor appears to be ant bed that has been repaired with concrete. Inside, the structure has a living area in one arm of the L and a kitchen that contains a small cast iron range. The shorter arm of the L is divided into two rooms, presumably as bedrooms, and there is a laundry in an angle of the awning with a small adjacent bathroom and stumps that probably held a water tank.

To the south east of the house is a corrugated iron shed with a hipped roof. Domestic plantings nearby include 2 mature mango trees, citrus trees, custard apple, guava and cucumbers.

== Heritage listing ==
Gunnawarra Homestead was listed on the Queensland Heritage Register on 21 October 1992 having satisfied the following criteria.

The place is important in demonstrating the evolution or pattern of Queensland's history.

Gunnawarra Homestead illustrates the pattern of early European exploration and settlement of Queensland where the development of pastoral properties preceded agriculture and the establishment of towns. As an early homestead in north Queensland that has remained in continuous use, it has important associations with the development of the pastoral industry.

The place has potential to yield information that will contribute to an understanding of Queensland's history.

Gunnawarra has the potential to yield information on the way in which such properties were run and evidence for the building techniques used over several generations, thus contributing to an understanding of Queensland's history.

The place is important in demonstrating the principal characteristics of a particular class of cultural places.

The homestead complex demonstrates the principal characteristics of its type well, including a sequence of residential buildings, associated outbuildings, graves, fences and mature trees.

The place has a special association with the life or work of a particular person, group or organisation of importance in Queensland's history.

Gunnawarra homestead has a special association with the life and work of the Atkinson family, who, as pioneer pastoralists, have contributed to the development of the industry in North Queensland.
