= Roads of Strategic Importance =

Australian Government initiative

Roads of Strategic Importance (ROSI) is a $5.8 billion initiative of the Australian Government designed to help connect regional businesses to local and international markets, and to better connect regional communities. The source for this article is an Australian Government website titled "Roads of Strategic Importance". Funding by the Australian Government is up to 80% of total costs, with the remainder being met by state, territory and local governments. ROSI reserves $1.5 billion for projects in Northern Australia, building on the benefits being delivered by the Northern Australia Roads Program and the Northern Australia Beef Roads Program.

== Types of work ==
ROSI is ensuring that key freight roads efficiently connect agricultural and mining regions to ports, airports and other transport hubs. The work undertaken includes bridge and culvert construction, road widening, sealing, overtaking lanes and pavement renewal.

== Strategic corridors ==
Most ROSI projects are grouped within defined corridors, which are listed separately in alphabetic sequence for each of Northern and Southern Australia. A corridor includes roads and related infrastructure associated with the efficient operation of the principal highway or road in the corridor. Each corridor listed contains zero to many projects, some of which pertain to a single road while others cover multiple roads and/or related infrastructure.

=== Northern Australia corridors ===
- Adelaide River to Wadeye (2 projects)
- Alice Springs to Darwin (7 projects)
- Alice Springs to Halls Creek (5 projects)
- Cairns to Northern Territory (NT) border (3 projects)
- Cooktown to Weipa (3 projects)
- Karratha to Tom Price (1 project)
- Mid-west secondary freight network (1 project)
- Mount Isa to Rockhampton (2 projects)
- Newman to Katherine (6 projects)
- NT gas industry roads upgrades (1 project)
- Tennant Creek to Townsville (7 projects)
- Townsville to Roma (11 projects)

=== Southern Australia corridors ===
- Ballarat to Ouyen (1 project)
- Barton Highway (1 project)
- Cockburn to Burra (1 project)
- Echuca to Robinvale (2 projects)
- Great Northern Highway – Bindoon bypass (1 project)
- Great southern secondary freight network
- Green triangle (2 projects)
- Hobart to Sorell (4 projects)
- Melbourne to Mildura (2 projects)
- Port Augusta to Perth (6 projects)
- Renmark to Gawler (1 project)
- Stawell to South Australia (SA) border (1 project)
- Tasmanian roads package (15 projects)
- Tenterfield to Newcastle (7 projects)
- Toowoomba to Ipswich (1 project)
- Toowoomba to Seymour (17 projects)
- Wheatbelt secondary freight network (1 project)

=== Non-corridor initiatives ===
- New South Wales (11 projects)
- Queensland (16 projects)
- South Australia (1 project)
- Victoria (4 projects)
- Western Australia (1 project)

== ROSI projects ==
For each corridor or project in the source document with a link indicator (underline) there is a linked Project Description web page or PDF document. The project description shows some or all of the following details:

- Benefits
- Funding
- Timetable
- Status

One named corridor has no associated projects, and several named projects have no linked Project Description. This article will be updated when further details become available.

=== Queensland projects ===
Refer to Roads of Strategic Importance in Queensland for a list of ROSI projects in Queensland. The document shows which projects have been copied to relevant Wikipedia articles. The project "Cairns to NT border corridor – Ootann Road Sealing", which is not identified in the source document for this article, has been copied to the relevant Wikipedia article.

=== Other States details copied to articles ===
NOTE: For States other than Queensland, refer to the Talk page for information on updating this section.

For all states and territories except the Australian Capital Territory there are ROSI projects for one or more roads in each of one or more strategic corridors, plus a number of non-corridor projects for all but Tasmania, the ACT and the Northern Territory. Some of the subject roads have Wikipedia articles that should be updated with details of the relevant project/s. The approximate number of projects listed for each state or territory is as follows:

- * New South Wales - 32
- * Northern Territory - 12
- * South Australia - 5
- * Tasmania - 18
- * Victoria - 9
- * Western Australia - 14

== Parliamentary report ==
The Parliament of Australia has produced a report on transport infrastructure that includes extensive details of the Roads of Strategic Importance Initiative, among others.

== See also ==
- Road transport in Australia
