= Forty Mile Scrub National Park =

National park in Queensland, Australia

- IUCN category II (national park)
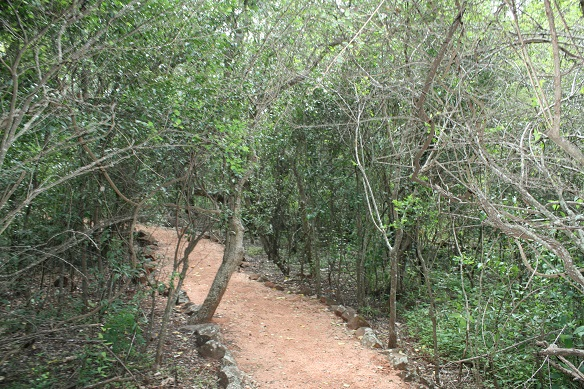

- Location within Queensland
- Location: Queensland
- Nearest city: Mount Garnet
- Coordinates: 18°05′22″S 144°51′44″E
- Area: 63.3 km^{2} (24.4 sq mi)
- Established: 1970
- Governing body: Queensland Parks and Wildlife Service
- Website: Official website

Forty Mile Scrub is a national park in Queensland, Australia. It is a 224 km drive southwest of Cairns.

Ancient volcanic streams, grass forests, springs, streams, and a preserved isolated pocket of semi-evergreen vines are just some of its features.

Many species of animals have found refuge here, some permanently, and some come occasionally, like koalas. This is home to the largest cockroach in the world.

== See also ==
- Protected areas of Queensland (Australia)
