= Kennedy Highway =

Highway in Queensland, Australia

Kennedy Highway Kennedy Developmental Road Queensland
- Kennedy Hwy (yellow on black), Kennedy Developmental (green on black)

General information
- Type: Highway
- Length: 1,179.8 km (733 mi)
- Route number(s): National Route 1 (Smithfield – Minnamoolka); State Route 62 (Minnamoolka – Boulia)

Major junctions
- NE end: Captain Cook Highway, (National Route 1) / State Route 44), Smithfield, Queensland
- Mulligan Highway (State Route 81); Malanda-Atherton Road (State Route 25); Gulf Developmental Road (National Route 1); Gregory Developmental Road (State Route 63); Flinders Highway (State Route A6); Landsborough Highway (State Route A2)
- SW end: Diamantina Developmental Road, (National Route 83), Boulia, Queensland

Location(s)
- Major settlements: Mareeba, Ravenshoe, Hughenden, Winton

Highway system
- Highways in Australia; National Highway • Freeways in Australia; Highways in Queensland

The Kennedy Highway is a highway in northern Queensland, Australia. It runs as National Route 1 for approximately 243 km from Smithfield, on the northern outskirts of Cairns, to the Gulf Developmental Road in the vicinity of Forty Mile Scrub and Undara Volcanic national parks (at Minnamoolka, about 40 kilometres south of Mount Garnet). South of this junction, the road continues as the Kennedy Developmental Road (State Highway 62) to Boulia about 936 kilometres away, via Hughenden. West of the junction, National Route 1 continues as the Gulf Developmental Road to Normanton.

== Route description ==
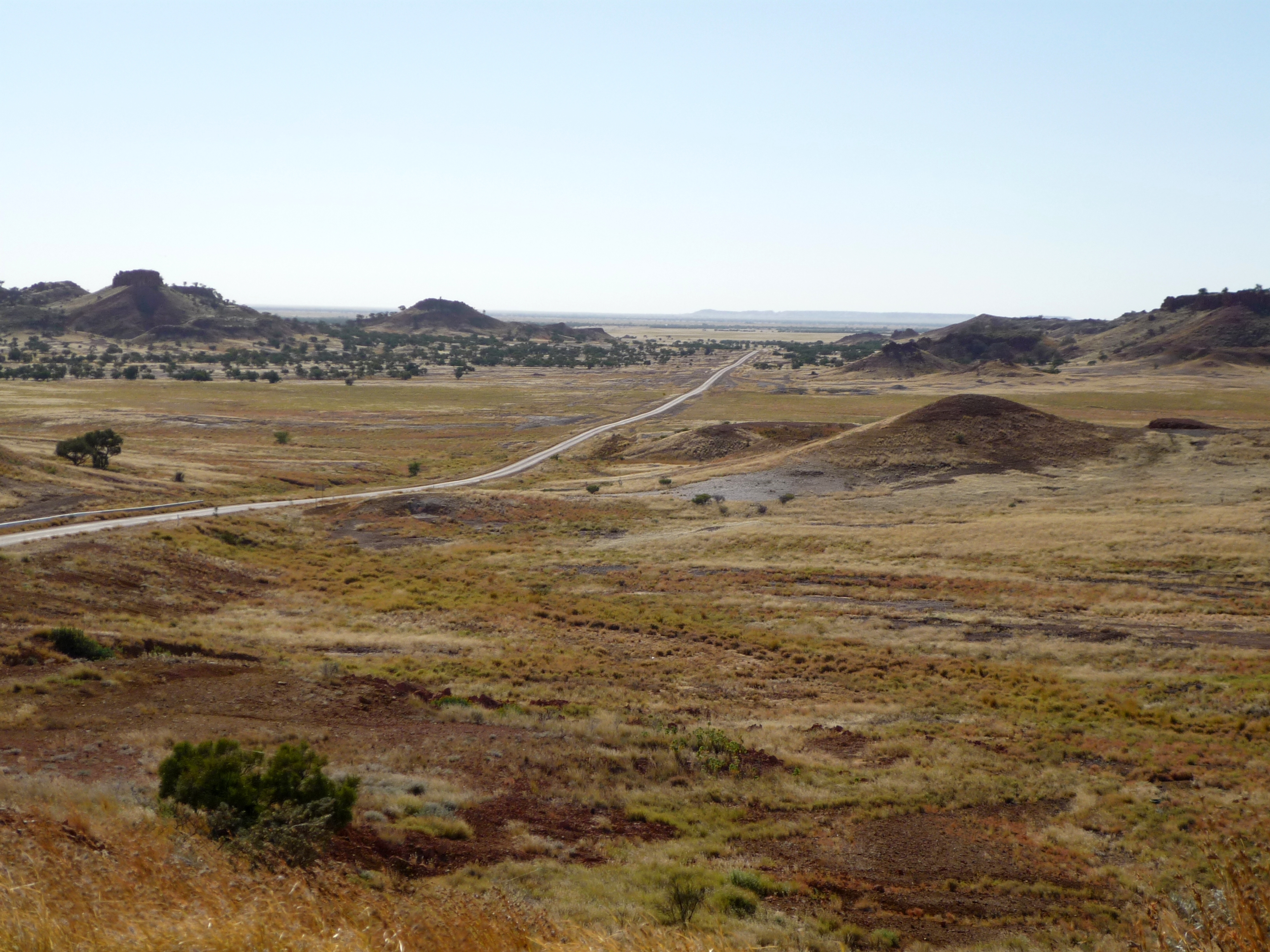
View from the Cawnpore Lookout along the Kennedy Developmental Road, in Middleton between Winton and Boulia, 2011

From Smithfield, the highway climbs up into the Atherton Tableland before heading in a general south-westerly direction to the aforementioned junction. The highway is mostly two-lanes. Major towns on, or just off, the Kennedy Highway include Smithfield, Kuranda, Mareeba, Atherton, Ravenshoe and Mount Garnet. Past Mount Garnet, the Kennedy Highway has several long sections of single lane bitumen. The section between The Lynd Roadhouse junction at Conjuboy and Hughenden is mostly unsealed and is also known as the Hann Highway.

For a distance of more than 100 km, from the crossing on the Diamantina River to a point southwest of Middleton, the Kennedy Developmental Road passes across a roughly circular zone measuring some 130 km (81 mi) across that has been identified by Geoscience Australia as a crustal anomaly, the Diamantina River ring feature. Proof is currently lacking as to the cause, but it is believed likely that the anomaly was caused by an asteroid strike that happened about 300 million years ago.

== Development proposal ==
Two northern councils (Etheridge and Flinders) have proposed development of the Hann Highway which would allow for the transport of products from Far North Queensland to markets in New South Wales and Victoria considerably quicker than via existing coastal routes which have rougher terrain and are sometimes impassable due to floods.

== Northern Australia Roads Program upgrades ==
The Northern Australia Roads Program announced in 2016 included two projects for the Kennedy Developmental Road.

=== Road widening ===
The project for widening a section of road from a one-lane seal to a two-lane seal between Mount Garnet and The Lynd was completed in early 2018 at a total cost of $3.3 million.

=== Road upgrading ===
The project for upgrading sections of the road between The Lynd and Hughenden was completed in early 2020 at a total cost of $47.9 million.

== Roads of Strategic Importance upgrades ==
The Roads of Strategic Importance initiative, last updated in March 2022, includes the following projects for the Kennedy Developmental Road.

=== Corridor upgrade ===
A lead project to upgrade the Queensland section of the Tennant Creek to Townsville corridor, including sections of the Barkly and Flinders Highways, the Kennedy Developmental Road and surrounding state and council roads, at an estimated cost of $250 million, was in the planning stage in 2020.

=== Progressive sealing ===
A project for progressive sealing of a section of the Kennedy Developmental Road between The Lynd and Hughenden at a cost of $50 million is planned to be completed by mid-2023. This project is targeted for "early works" by the Queensland Government.

== Other upgrades ==
=== Strengthen and widen between Winton and Boulia ===
A project to strengthen and widen about 5 kilometres (3.1 mi) of the road (Outback Way) between Winton and Boulia, at a cost of $4.825 million, was completed in September 2020.

=== Bridge upgrade planning ===
A project to plan the upgrade of the Barron River bridge, at a cost of $2.1 million, was to be completed in late 2022.

=== Intelligent Transport System ===
A project to install Intelligent Transport System (ITS) treatments on Kuranda Range Road, at a cost of $30 million, was due to completed by late 2022.

=== Targeted road safety improvements ===
A project to provide targeted road safety improvements between Mareeba and Tolga, at a cost of $37.5 million, was due for completion in mid 2022.

=== Road safety enhancement works ===
A works program of six projects to provide road safety enhancements between Kuranda and Mareeba, at a cost of $45 million, was expected to complete in early 2023.

== Major intersections ==
LGA	Location	km	mi	Destinations	Notes
Cairns	Smithfield	0	0.0	Captain Cook Highway (State Route 44) north – Port Douglas / south (National Route 1) Cairns	North–eastern end of Kennedy Highway (National Route 1) From here to Kuranda the road is more commonly known as Kuranda Range road.
Barron River		12.6	7.8	Bridge at Kuranda	
Barron River		47.3	29.4	Bridge at Mareeba	
Mareeba	Mareeba	48.1	29.9	Mareeba Connection Road – north – Mareeba	
Mareeba	Mareeba	48.9	30.4	Mulligan Highway (State Route 81) – north – Mareeba and Mount Molloy	
Tablelands	Atherton	80.3	49.9	Atherton–Herberton Road (State Route 52) – south – Herberton	Western concurrency terminus with State Route 52
Tablelands	Atherton	81.0	50.3	Gillies Highway (State Route 52) (via Louise Street) – north, then east – Yungaburra	Eastern concurrency terminus with State Route 52
Tablelands	Atherton	83.9	52.1	Malanda–Atherton Road (State Route 25) – east – Malanda	
Scrubby Creek		90.1	56.0	Bridge at Wongabel	
Tablelands	Wondecla / Evelyn boundary	108.4	67.4	Longlands Gap–Herberton Road (State Route 52) – west – Herberton	
Tablelands	Evelyn	117.2	72.8	East Evelyn Road (State Route 24) – east – Millaa Millaa	
Wild River, which becomes Herbert River just downstream (south) of this point		154.9	96.3	Bridge at Millstream / Innot Hot Springs boundary	
Tablelands	Minnamoolka	243.5	151.3	Gulf Developmental Road (National Route 1) – west – Georgetown	This intersection is widely known as "Forty Mile Scrub" after the national park situated there. Kennedy Highway continues south as Kennedy Developmental Road (State Route 62)
Etheridge	Conjuboy	338.4	210.3	Gregory Developmental Road (State Route 63) – southeast – Charters Towers	This intersection is widely known as "The Lynd" after the roadhouse situated there. From here to Hughenden the road is more commonly known by its former name, the Hann Highway.
Flinders River		603.7	375.1	Bridge at Hughenden	
Flinders	Hughenden	604.1	375.4	Flinders Highway (State Route A6) – south, then east – Charters Towers / west – Richmond	Eastern concurrency terminus with Flinders Highway
Flinders	Hughenden	604.4	375.6	Flinders Highway (State Route A6) – west – Richmond	Western concurrency terminus with Flinders Highway. Kennedy Developmental Road continues south-west via Resolution Street.
Winton	Winton	819.7	509.3	Landsborough Highway (State Route A2) – southeast – Longreach / northwest – Cloncurry	Eastern concurrency terminus with Landsborough Highway. Kennedy Developmental Road enters Winton as Manuka Street.
Winton	Corfield	825.6	513.0	Landsborough Highway (State Route A2) – northwest – Cloncurry	Western concurrency terminus with Landsborough Highway
Boulia	Boulia	1,179.8	733.1	Diamantina Developmental Road (National Route 83) – northwest – Dajarra and Mount Isa / southwest – Birdsville	Western end of Kennedy Developmental Road (State Route 62)
1.000 mi = 1.609 km; 1.000 km = 0.621 mi: Concurrency terminus; Route transition

== See also ==
- Highways in Australia
- List of highways in Queensland
