= Kalunga, Queensland =

Kalunga
- Suburb
- Interactive map of Kalunga
- Coordinates: 17.4391°S 145.3666°E
- Country: Australia
- State: Queensland
- LGA: Tablelands Region
- Location: 9.3 km (5.8 mi) S of Herberton; 27.7 km (17.2 mi) SW of Atherton; 105 km (65 mi) SW of Cairns; 345 km (214 mi) NNW of Townsville; 1,813 km (1,127 mi) NNW of Brisbane

Government
  - State electorate: Hill
  - Federal division: Kennedy

Area
  - Total: 57.8 km^{2} (22.3 sq mi)

Population
  - Total: 103 (2021 census)
  - Density: 1.782/km^{2} (4.615/sq mi)
- Time zone: UTC+10:00 (AEST)
- Postcode: 4887
Suburbs around Kalunga
Watsonville	Watsonville	Herberton
Silver Valley	Kalunga	Wondecla
Kaban	Kaban	Wondecla

Kalunga is a rural locality in the Tablelands Region, Queensland, Australia. In the 2021 census, Kalunga had a population of 103 people.

== Geography ==
The Great Dividing Range loosely forms the northern boundary of the locality. The Wild River forms a small part of the eastern boundary before flowing through to the south-west. Basalt Creek forms the south-western boundary before joining the Wild.

Longlands Gap–Herberton Road (State Route 52) runs along part of the eastern boundary. The Herberton–Petford Road runs along most of the north-eastern boundary.

The southern part of the locality is within the Bluff State Forest. Apart from this protected area, the predominant land use is grazing on native vegetation with a small amount of crop growing.

== History ==
The Tablelands railway line from Herberton to Tumoulin opened on 31 July 1911. The line closed in 1988. Kalunga was served by three railway stations, now abandoned (from north to south):

- Tepon railway station (17.4275°S 145.3910°E)
- Kalunga railway station (17.4480°S 145.3771°E)
- Flaggy Creek railway station (17.4521°S 145.3788°E)

== Demographics ==
In the 2016 census, Kalunga had a population of 95 people.

In the 2021 census, Kalunga had a population of 103 people.

== Education ==
There are no schools in Kalunga. The nearest government primary school is Herberton State School which has its primary campus in Moomin to the north-east. The nearest government secondary schools are Herberton State School (to Year 10) with its secondary campus in Herberton, Atherton State High School (to Year 12) in Atherton to the north-east, and Ravenshoe State School (to Year 12) in Ravenshoe to the south-east.

== Facilities ==
Despite the name, the Wondecla Rural Fire Station is at 5 Flaggy Creek Road in Kalunga (17.4263°S 145.3980°E).
