= Silver Valley, Queensland =

Silver Valley
- Suburb
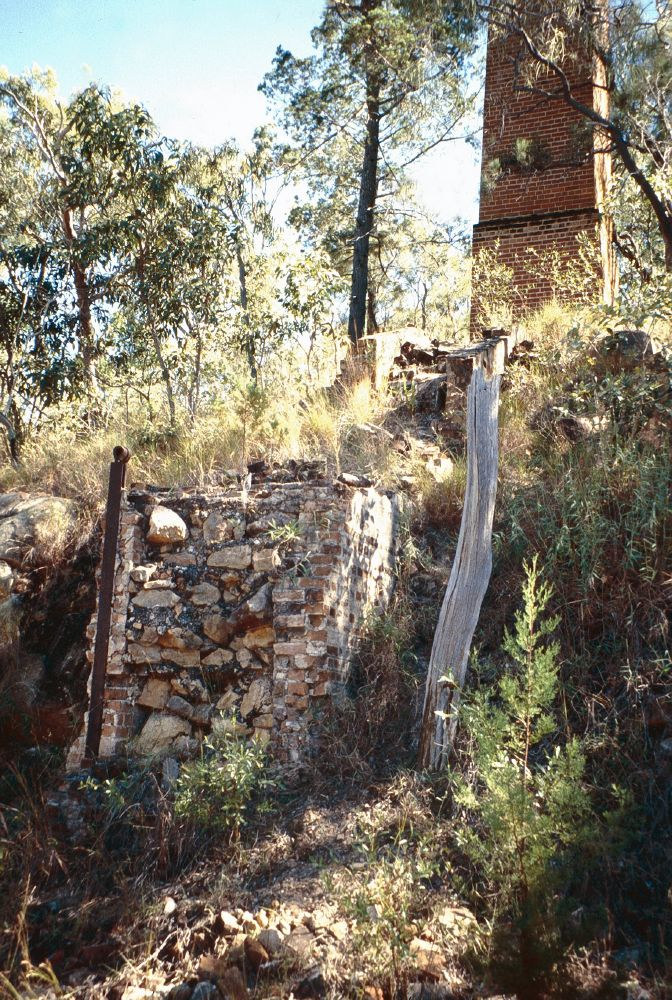
- Remains of the Coolgarra Battery, Silver Valley

- Interactive map of Silver Valley
- Coordinates: 17.5377°S 145.2625°E
- Country: Australia
- State: Queensland
- LGA: Tablelands Region
- Location: 31.8 km (19.8 mi) W of Ravenshoe; 82.1 km (51.0 mi) SW of Atherton; 147 km (91 mi) SW of Cairns; 1,715 km (1,066 mi) NNW of Brisbane

Government
  - State electorate: Dalrymple
  - Federal division: Kennedy

Area
  - Total: 331.8 km^{2} (128.1 sq mi)

Population
  - Total: 145 (2021 census)
  - Density: 0.4370/km^{2} (1.132/sq mi)
- Time zone: UTC+10:00 (AEST)
- Postcode: 4872
Suburbs around Silver Valley
| Irvinebank | Watsonville | Kalunga |
| Irvinebank | Silver Valley | Kaban |
| Mount Garnet | Innot Hot Springs | Millstream |

Silver Valley is a rural locality in the Tablelands Region, Queensland, Australia. It is known for its mining in the late 1800s and early 1900s. In the 2021 census, Silver Valley had a population of 145 people.

== Geography ==
The Wild River forms the western boundary of the locality.

Although historically part of Silver Valley, the now-abandoned township of Coolgarra is just within the current boundaries of neighbouring Mount Garnet (17.57434°S 145.19751°E).

The Kennedy Highway enters the locality at its south-eastern corner (Millstream) forming part of its southern boundary before passing through the south of the locality and then exiting to the south (Innot Hot Springs).

The locality is mountainous, rising from an elevation of 650 metres (2,130 ft) in Bulldog Gully in the south of the locality through to numerous peaks in the locality (from north to south):

- Middle Ridge (17.4110°S 145.3014°E) 1,108 metres (3,635 ft)
- Mount Clotten (17.4181°S 145.3014°E) 1,079 metres (3,540 ft)
- Mount Nolan (17.4282°S 145.2719°E) 970 metres (3,180 ft)
- Breccia Hill (17.4482°S 145.2859°E) 837 metres (2,746 ft)
- Hammer Hill (17.4505°S 145.3006°E) 973 metres (3,192 ft)
- Mount Lancelot (17.4513°S 145.2730°E) 928 metres (3,045 ft)
- Mount Klaatsch (17.4600°S 145.3014°E) 1,026 metres (3,366 ft)
- Mount Missler (17.4676°S 145.2958°E) 988 metres (3,241 ft)
- Perrots Knob (17.4695°S 145.2861°E) 916 metres (3,005 ft)
- Mount Port Arthur (17.5968°S 145.2248°E) 915 metres (3,002 ft)
- Mount Wilson (17.6082°S 145.2322°E) 790 metres (2,590 ft)
- Mount Gibson (17.6362°S 145.2083°E) 842 metres (2,762 ft)

The land is relatively undeveloped apart from some areas now laid bare as the result of mining. The land use is predominantly grazing on native vegetation. Most of the residential use is along the Wild River in the south-east of the locality.

== History ==
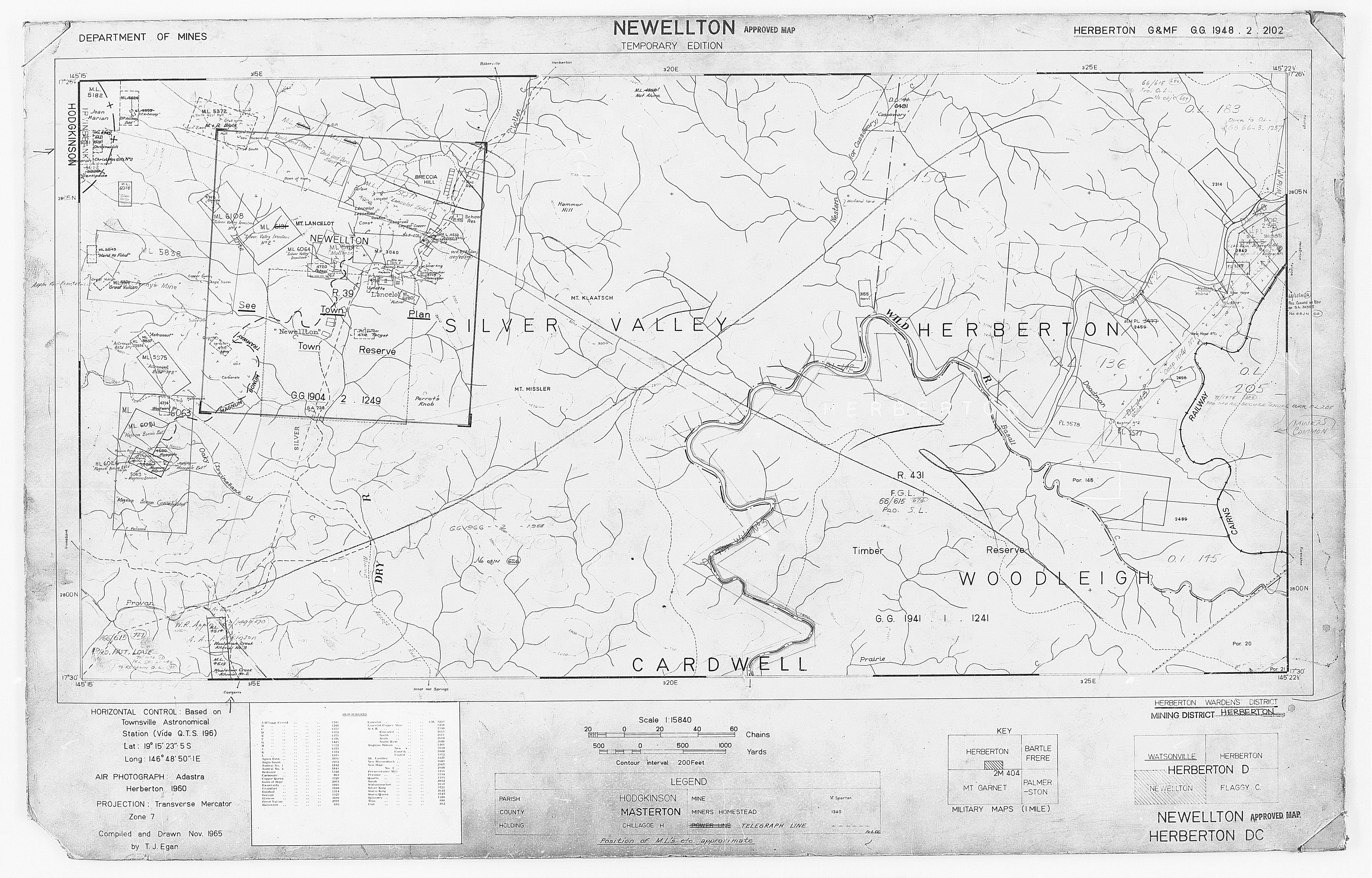
Map of Newellton, 1965

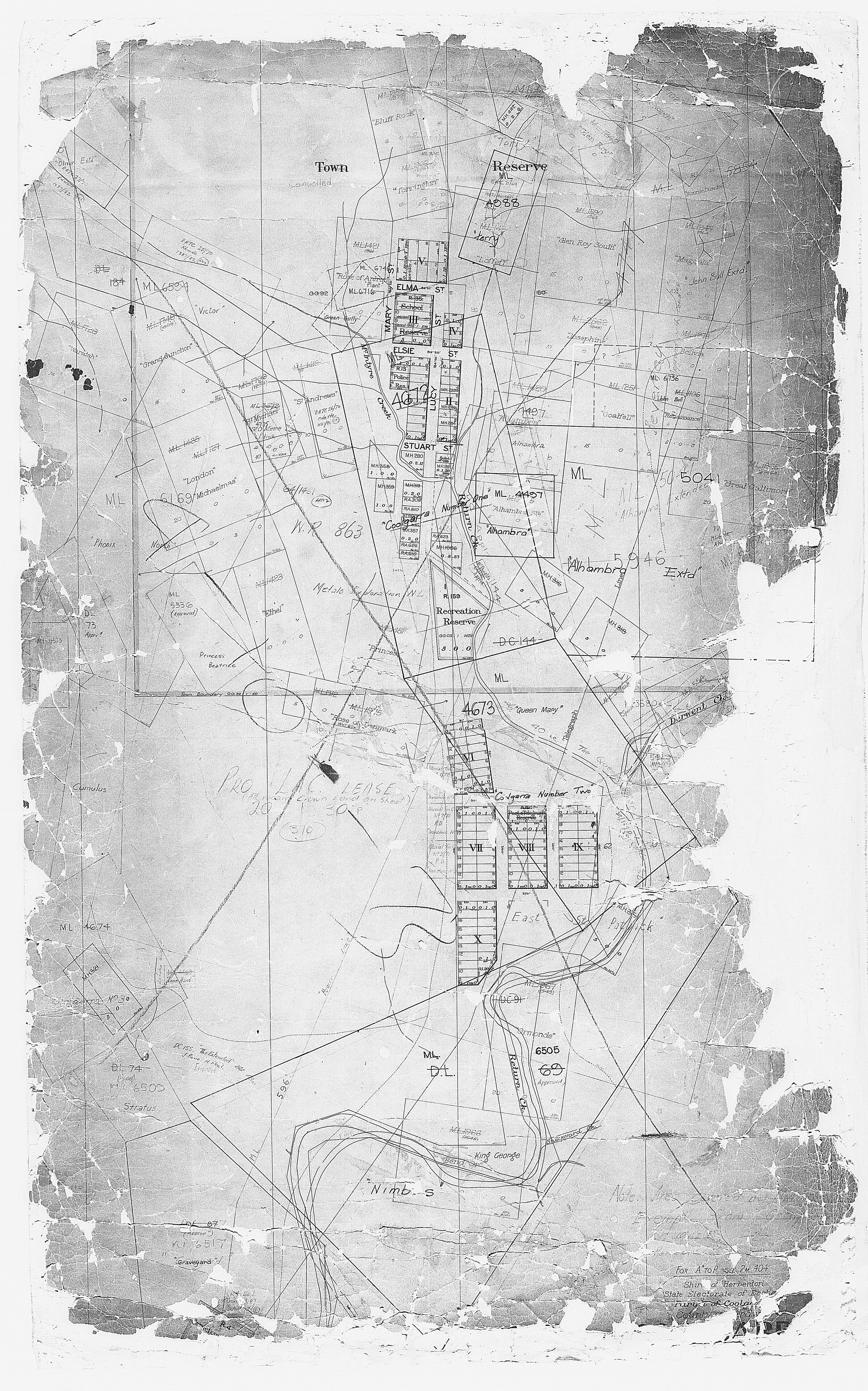
Coolgarra Mine Map (created between 1934 and 1972)

James Venture Mulligan is credited with the first discovery of silver at Silver Valley in 1880. By 1883, outcrops of silver, lead and galena had been found in the area and it was named Silver Valley and mining commenced. It was also known as Newellton after a pioneer family. However, while the silver mines were initially productive (one yielding up to 150 ounces of metal per ton), after a few years the silver lode was exhausted and the mines abandoned. However, in 1895, three prospector George Harrod discovered two rich lodes of tin and, with Hammond and White, established the Lancelot mine and, with Hammond, White and Daniels, established the Hadleigh Castle mine. In 1899 a German company (the German Lancelot Tin Mining Company) purchased the Lancelot Mine and proposed naming the area Lancelot after the mine and later proposed to establish a new town called New Frankfurt (although there is no evidence that this occurred). However, the German company did build a dam and a 5-head battery. However, by 1910 the lodes were exhausted and diamond drills were used to search for new lodes, but without success. In 1911 the mines were sold to John Moffat. However, the popular story is that the Germans operated the mine up until the start of World War I whereupon they suddenly disappeared overnight, but this story reflects the anti-German sentiment in response to World War I rather than actual events.

Coolgarra Provisional School opened on 29 April 1901. On 1 January 1909, it became Coolgarra State School. In July 1916, it became a half-time provisional school in conjunction with Lower Nettles Provisional School (meaning a single teacher shared between two schools). However, Lower Nettles closed later in 1916 and Coolgarra was again a full -time state school. Coolgarra State School closed in 1934. The school was on a 3-acre (1.2 ha) site bounded by Mary, Elma, Lucy and Elsie Streets (17.56621°S 145.19726°E), now within the boundaries of present-day Mount Garnet.

Lancelot Provisional School opened in 1905 but closed in 1906 when insufficient students enrolled. It reopened circa 1920 and closed in 1926. It was on 2-acre (0.81 ha) site on the eastern side of Silver Valley Road (17.45170°S 145.28883°E).

Despite the apparent cessation of mining in the area, Silver Valley was described in 1912 as being "rich in minerals" with "beautiful scenery, fishing and shooting". The Silver Valley Hotel (licensee James Ramsay) could provide accommodation for 20 people for 6/- per day or 30/- per week.

Like most old mines, there are occasional flurries of renewed activity whenever there were prospects of poorer ore lodes being profitably mined, usually in response to rising metal prices or more efficient extraction technologies, but generally such mining is short-lived as it is extremely price-sensitive.

== Demographics ==
In the 2016 census, Silver Valley had a population of 144 people.

In the 2021 census, Silver Valley had a population of 145 people.

== Heritage listings ==
Silver Valley has a number of heritage-listed sites, including:

- Coolgarra Battery, Coolgarra Station (17.5729°S 145.2065°E)

== Education ==
There are no schools in Silvery Valley. The nearest government primary schools are:

- Mount Garnet State School in neighbouring Mount Garnet to the south-west
- Irvinebank State School in neighbouring Irvinebank to the west
- Herberton State School at its primary campus Moomin campus to the north-east.

The nearest government secondary schools are:

- Herberton State School (to Year 10) at its secondary campus in Herberton to the north-east
- Ravenshoe State School (to Year 12) in Ravenshoe to the east
- Atherton State High School (to Year 12) in Atherton to the north-east.
