= Atherton–Herberton–Longlands Gap Road =

Road in Queensland, Australia

Atherton–Herberton–Longlands Gap Road Atherton–Herberton Road, Longlands Gap–Herberton Road Queensland

General information
- Type: Rural road
- Length: 33.5 km (21 mi)
- Route number(s): State Route 52

Major junctions
- North end: Kennedy Highway, Atherton
- Herberton–Petford Road
- South end: Kennedy Highway, Evelyn

Location(s)
- Major settlements: Herberton

Atherton–Herberton–Longlands Gap Road is a continuous 33.5-kilometre (20.8 mi) road route in the Tablelands local government area of Queensland, Australia. It has two official names, Atherton–Herberton Road and Longlands Gap–Herberton Road. The entire route is signed as part of State Route 52. Both parts are state-controlled district roads, numbered 663 and 665, and the entire road is rated as a local road of regional significance (LRRS).

== Route description ==
The road starts at an intersection with the Kennedy Highway in the town and locality of Atherton. Known within the town as Herberton Road, the name soon changes to Atherton–Herberton Road. It runs generally south through the outskirts of Atherton before turning south-west through Carrington, Wongabel and Moomin. On entering Herberton the road turns south through the town, where it passes the exit to Herberton–Petford Road to the west. This intersection is the point where the official name changes to Longlands Gap–Herberton Road. Through the town, the road carries the street names Broadway, Grace Street and Perkins Street.

As it leaves the town of Herberton the road crosses the Wild River and continues south through the locality before entering Wondecla. Reaching the north-eastern boundary of Kalunga it turns east along the boundary. It then turns to the south-east and crosses Wondecla until it reaches an intersection with the Kennedy Highway on the boundary between Wondecla and Evelyn, where it ends.

The road is fully sealed to at least a two-lane standard.

Both sections of the road pass through hilly country, with each section having more than 500 metres (1,600 ft) with an incline greater than 10%, and with some parts exceeding 15%.

Longland Gap (alternate spelling) is a natural feature in the vicinity of the southern end of the road, in the locality of Upper Barron.

== History ==
Atherton was surveyed in 1885. It became the administrative centre for the district, which hosted timber, mining and agricultural industries. Until the railway arrived in 1903 it was a stopping place on the coach road from Mareeba to Herberton.

A survey for a town in Carrington was done in 1884.

Herberton was established as a tin mining town in 1880. By 1903 it was a thriving town with a coach service to Mareeba railway terminus, and connections to Cairns, Port Douglas, Georgetown and Croydon.

Evelyn takes its name from an early pastoral run.

== Herberton–Petford Road ==
Herberton–Petford Road
- Location: Atherton–Herberton Road and Longlands Gap–Herberton Road, Herberton to Burke Developmental Road, Petford
- Length: 66.2 km (41.1 mi)

Herberton-Petford Road is a state-controlled district road (number 6632), rated as a local road of regional significance (LRRS). It runs from the intersection of Atherton-Herberton Road and Longlands Gap-Herberton Road in Herberton to the Burke Developmental Road in Petford, a distance of 66.2 kilometres (41.1 mi). The road has no major intersections.

== Major intersections ==
All distances are from Google Maps. The entire road is within the Tablelands local government area.

Location	km	mi	Destinations	Notes
Atherton	0	0.0	Kennedy Highway – north – Tolga, Mareeba – east, then south – Evelyn, Ravenshoe	Northern end of Atherton–Herberton Road. Road continues south as State Route 52.
Herberton	17.9	11.1	Herberton–Petford Road – west – Petford	Road continues south as Longlands Gap–Herberton Road.
Wondecla / Evelyn midpoint	33.5	20.8	Kennedy Highway – north – Atherton – south – Evelyn, Ravenshoe	Southern end of Longlands Gap–Herberton Road.
1.000 mi = 1.609 km; 1.000 km = 0.621 mi: Route transition

== See also ==
- List of numbered roads in Queensland
