= Wondecla, Queensland =

Wondecla
- Suburb
- Interactive map of Wondecla
- Coordinates: 17.4363°S 145.4288°E
- Country: Australia
- State: Queensland
- LGA: Tablelands Region
- Location: 10.4 km (6.5 mi) SSE of Herberton; 28.7 km (17.8 mi) SSW of Atherton; 104 km (65 mi) SW of Cairns; 337 km (209 mi) NNW of Townsville; 1,688 km (1,049 mi) NNW of Brisbane

Government
  - State electorate: Hill
  - Federal division: Kennedy

Area
  - Total: 66.5 km^{2} (25.7 sq mi)

Population
  - Total: 661 (2021 census)
  - Density: 9.940/km^{2} (25.74/sq mi)
- Time zone: UTC+10:00 (AEST)
- Postcode: 4887
Suburbs around Wondecla
Herberton	Moomin	Upper Barron
Kalunga	Wondecla	Upper Barron
Kaban	Evelyn	Evelyn

Wondecla is a rural locality in the Tablelands Region, Queensland, Australia. In the 2021 census, Wondecla had a population of 661 people.

== Geography ==
The Kennedy Highway roughly forms the south-east boundary of the locality. Longlands Gap–Herberton Road passes through the locality from north-west (coming from Herberton) to the south-east, joining the Kennedy Highway at the south-east boundary.

The western part of the locality is around 900–950 metres above sea level and is flat enough to be used as farmland. The northern, eastern and southern parts of the locality are more mountainous with numerous unnamed peaks (between 1000 and 1100 metres) and are not developed. The north-east of the locality is protected as the Herberton Range National Park and the Herberton Range Conservation Park. The southern part of the locality is The Bluff State Forest.

Wondecla Creek (formerly Nigger Creek) rises in the south-east of the locality and flows through the lower parts of the locality towards the north-east where it has its confluence with the Wild River, which then becomes the locality's western boundary.

== History ==
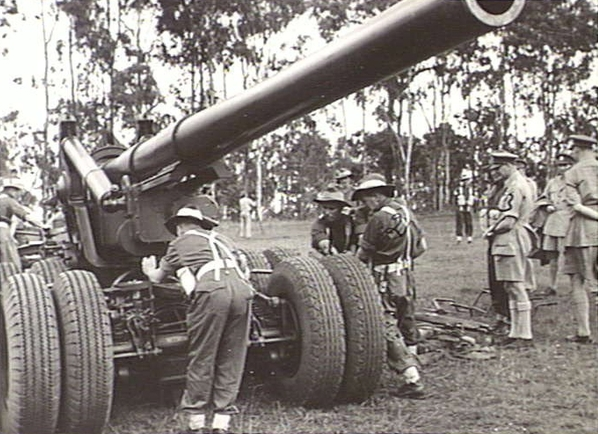
Australian army training with 155 mm gun, 1945

Wondecla was originally called Nigger Creek. It takes its current name from the former Wondecla railway station (17.4092°S 145.3920°E) on the Tablelands railway line. The station's name was assigned by the Queensland Railways Department on 31 July 1911. Wondecla is believed to be an Aboriginal word meaning the junction of creeks, which probably refers to the confluence of the Wild River and the Wondecla Creek given that the station was near the confluence.

The Nigger Creek Provisional School opened 7 May 1883. On 1 January 1909, it became Nigger Creek State School. In 1922, it was renamed Wondecla State School. It closed on 20 July 1958. It was on a 5-acre-8-perch (2.04 ha) site on the western side of Longlands Gap Road immediately south of Wondecla Creek (17.4145°S 145.3933°E).

A postal receiving office opened at Nigger Creek about 1899. Nigger Creek Post Office was opened in October 1910 and was renamed Wondecla Post Office on 1 June 1918. The post office closed 30 June 1975.

In World War II as part of the Atherton Project, tent encampments were established by the Australian Army (6th and 7th Divisions) near Wondecla, Wongabel, and Ravenshoe.

== Demographics ==
In the 2016 census, Wondecla had a population of 638 people.

In the 2021 census, Wondecla had a population of 661 people.

== Education ==
There are no schools in Wondecla. The nearest government primary schools are Herberton State School's primary campus in neighbouring Moonmin to the north and Ravenshoe State School in Ravenshoe to the south. The nearest government secondary schools are:

- Herberton State School's secondary campus (to Year 10) in neighbouring Herberton to the north-west
- Atherton State High School in Atherton to the north
- Malanda State High School in Malanda to the north-east
- Ravenshoe State School (to Year 10)

== Attractions ==
Drovers Lookout is a tourist attraction in the Herberton Range Conservation Park (17.3928°S 145.4640°E). It can be reached by a shared trail (vehicles, horses, and walking).
