= Kaban, Queensland =

Kaban
- Suburb
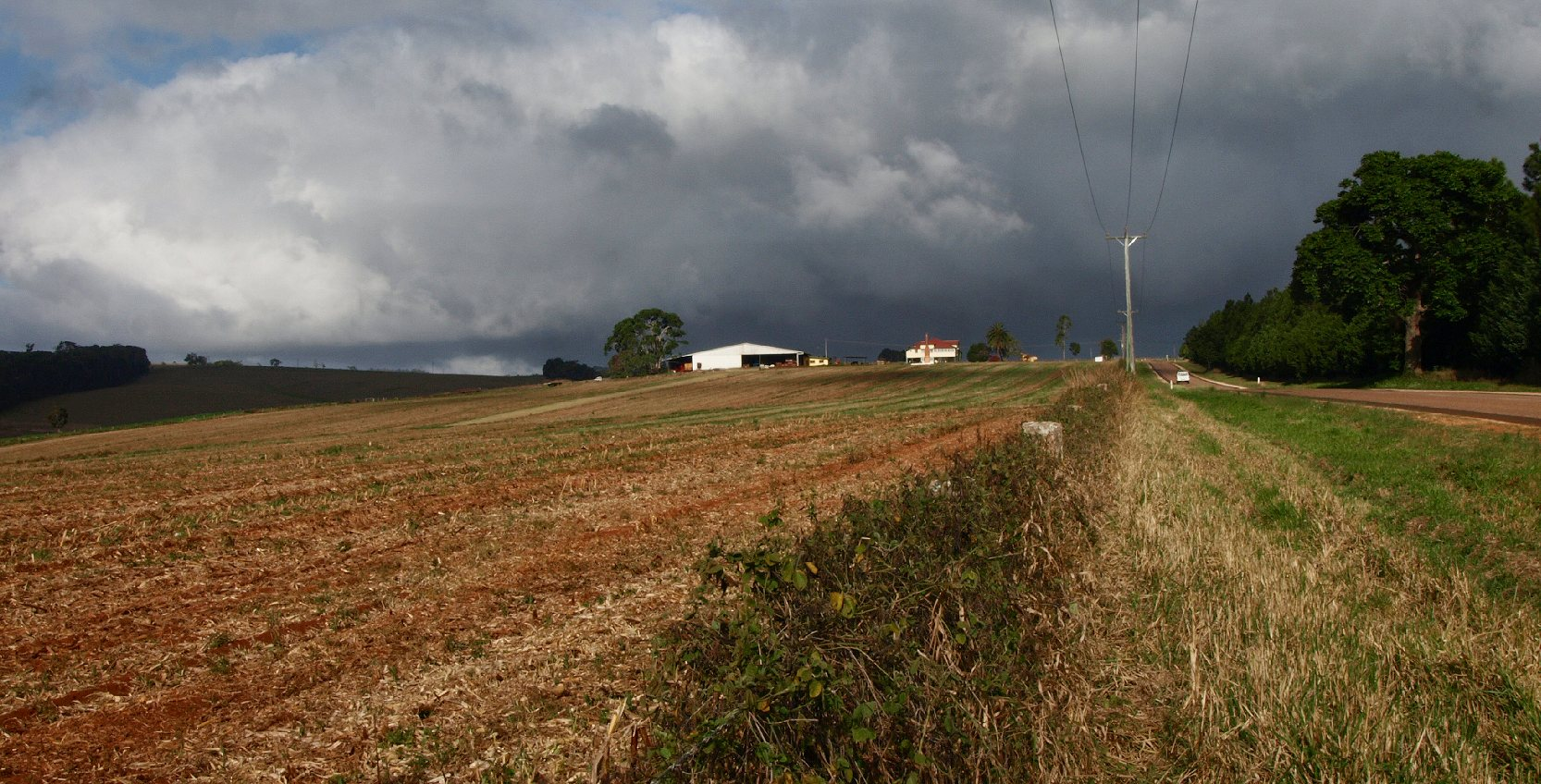
- Fields in Kaban, 2008

- Interactive map of Kaban
- Coordinates: 17.5077°S 145.3819°E
- Country: Australia
- State: Queensland
- LGA: Tablelands Region
- Location: 13.5 km (8.4 mi) NW of Ravenshoe; 20.2 km (12.6 mi) S of Herberton; 42.3 km (26.3 mi) SSW of Atherton; 112 km (70 mi) SW of Cairns; 1,690 km (1,050 mi) NNW of Brisbane

Government
  - State electorate: Hill
  - Federal division: Kennedy

Area
  - Total: 98.1 km^{2} (37.9 sq mi)

Population
  - Total: 94 (2021 census)
  - Density: 0.958/km^{2} (2.482/sq mi)
- Time zone: UTC+10:00 (AEST)
- Postcode: 4888
Suburbs around Kaban
Silver Valley	Kalunga	Wondecla
Silver Valley	Kaban	Evelyn
Silver Valley	Millstream	Tumoulin

Kaban is a rural locality in the Tablelands Region, Queensland, Australia. In the 2021 census, Kaban had a population of 94 people.

== History ==
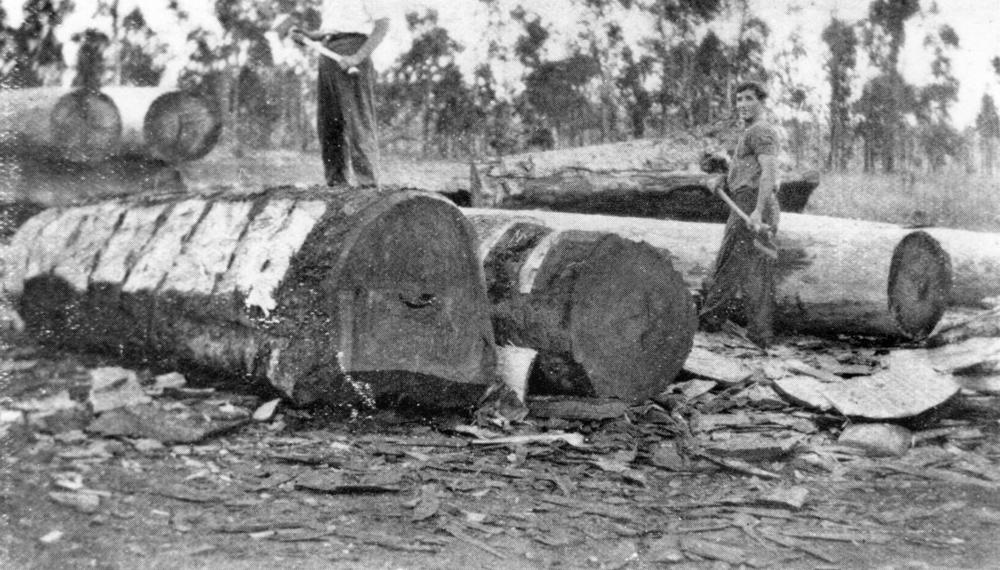
Axemen removing bark from felled walnut trees, Kaban, 1936

The locality takes its name from the former railway station; it is an Aboriginal word, meaning place of the sugar glider.

Kaban State School opened in 1924. It closed in 1927. In 1928, the school building was removed for re-erection at Moresby.

== Demographics ==
In the 2016 census, Kaban had a population of 101 people.

In the 2021 census, Kaban had a population of 94 people.

== Education ==
There are no schools in Kaban. The nearest government primary schools are Ravenshoe State School in Ravenshoe to the south-east and Herberton State School in Herberton to the north. The nearest government secondary schools are Ravenshoe State School (to Year 12) in Ravenshoe and Herberton State School (to Year 10).
