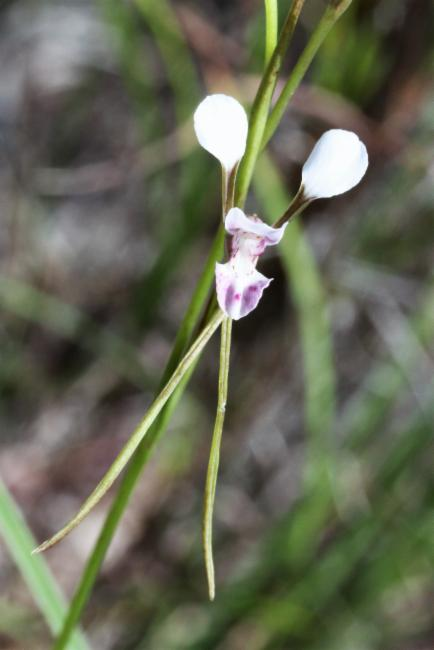

Scientific classification
- Kingdom: Plantae
- Clade: Tracheophytes
- Clade: Angiosperms
- Clade: Monocots
- Order: Asparagales
- Family: Orchidaceae
- Subfamily: Orchidoideae
- Tribe: Diurideae
- Genus: Diuris
- Species: D. oporina

Binomial name
- Diuris oporina D.L.Jones

= Diuris oporina =

Autumn donkey orchid

Species of orchid

Diuris oporina, commonly called the autumn donkey orchid or northern white donkeys tails is a species of orchid that is endemic to Queensland. It has a single tapering, linear leaf at its base and up to ten white flowers with mauve to purple markings. It grows in the drier parts of the tablelands in Far North Queensland.

== Description ==
Diuris oporina is a tuberous, perennial herb with a single tapering, linear leaf 100–250 mm (4–10 in) long, 7–10 mm (0.3–0.4 in) wide with a purplish red base. Up to ten white flowers with mauve, lilac or purplish markings, 17–22 mm (0.7–0.9 in) wide are borne on a flowering stem 200–450 mm (8–20 in) tall. The dorsal sepal projects forward and is oblong to egg-shaped with the narrower end towards the base, 9–10 mm (0.35–0.39 in) long and about 5 mm (0.2 in) wide. The lateral sepals are linear, green, 25–35 mm (0.98–1.4 in) long and about 1 mm (0.04 in) wide. The petals are more or less erect, egg-shaped, 6.5–8 mm (0.26–0.31 in) long and 4–5 mm (0.16–0.20 in) wide on a purplish brown stalk 4–5 mm (0.16–0.20 in) long. The labellum is 7–8 mm (0.28–0.31 in) long, projects forwards below horizontal and has three lobes. The centre lobe is wedge-shaped to diamond shaped, 4–5 mm (0.16–0.20 in) wide with mauve or purple markings. The side lobes are linear to oblong, about 2.5 mm (0.1 in) long and wide. There are two rounded ridge-like calli about 5 mm (0.2 in) long at the lower half of the mid-line of the base of the labellum. Flowering occurs mainly from March to May, sometimes later.

== Taxonomy and naming ==
Diuris oporina was first formally described in 1991 by David Jones from a specimen collected near Watsonville, Queensland on the Atherton Tableland and the description was published in Australian Orchid Research. The specific epithet (oporina) is derived from the Ancient Greek word oporinos meaning "autumnal", referring to the flowering period of this species.

== Distribution and habitat ==
The autumn donkey orchid grows on ridges and sloped in forest and woodland on the drier parts of the Atherton and Evelyn tablelands.
