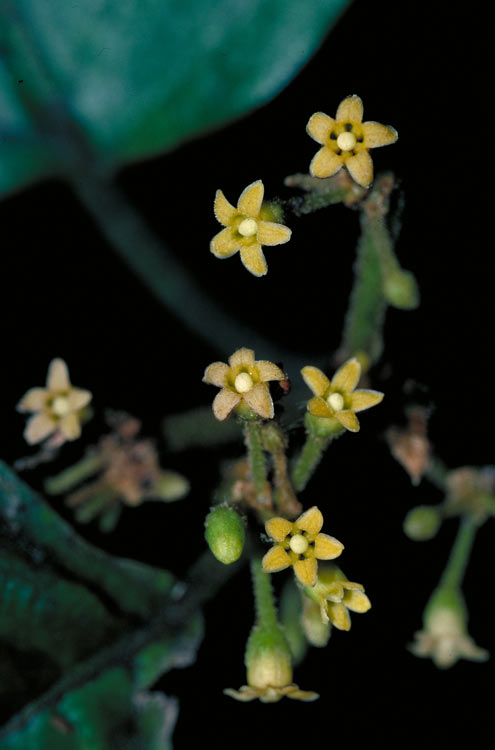

Conservation status
- Critically Endangered (NCA)

Scientific classification
- Kingdom: Plantae
- Clade: Tracheophytes
- Clade: Angiosperms
- Clade: Eudicots
- Clade: Asterids
- Order: Gentianales
- Family: Apocynaceae
- Genus: Gymnema
- Species: G. stramineum

Binomial name
- Gymnema stramineum P.I.Forst.

= Gymnema stramineum =

Species of flowering plant

Gymnema stramineum is a species of plant in the oleander and frangipani family Apocynaceae. It is found in a small part of the Atherton Tableland in northeast Queensland, Australia, and the conservation status of 'critically endangered'.

It is a vine with a stem diameter up to 10 cm (3.9 in) diameter, and has been collected in the area from Yungaburra to Wongabel a total of 33 times. This species is listed as critically endangered under the Queensland Government's Nature Conservation Act. As of November 2025, it has not been assessed by the International Union for Conservation of Nature (IUCN).
