= Carrington, Queensland =

Carrington
- Suburb
- Interactive map of Carrington
- Coordinates: 17.2972°S 145.4522°E
- Country: Australia
- State: Queensland
- LGA: Tablelands Region
- Location: 5.4 km (3.4 mi) S of Atherton; 82.7 km (51.4 mi) SW of Cairns; 352 km (219 mi) NNW of Townsville; 1,822 km (1,132 mi) NNW of Brisbane

Government
  - State electorate: Hill
  - Federal division: Kennedy

Area
  - Total: 11.0 km^{2} (4.2 sq mi)

Population
  - Total: 191 (2021 census)
  - Density: 17.36/km^{2} (45.0/sq mi)
- Time zone: UTC+10:00 (AEST)
- Postcode: 4883
Suburbs around Carrington
Watsonville	Atherton	Atherton
Watsonville	Carrington	Atherton
Wongabel	Wongabel	Wongabel

Carrington is a rural locality in the Tablelands Region, Queensland, Australia. In the 2021 census, Carrington had a population of 191 people.

== Geography ==
The Atherton–Herberton Road runs through from north to south.

== History ==
The town was originally named Scrubby Creek. However, in 1883 it was renamed Carrington after the police magistrate at Herberton. The first town survey was in 1884.

Carrington Provisional School opened on 6 July 1891. On 1 January 1909, it became Carrington State School. It closed in 1937.

== Demographics ==
In the 2016 census, Carrington had a population of 190 people.

In the 2021 census, Carrington had a population of 191 people.

== Education ==
There are no schools in Carrington. The nearest government primary school is Atherton State School and the nearest government secondary school is Atherton State High School, both of which are in neighbouring Atherton to the north.
