= Coolgarra Battery =

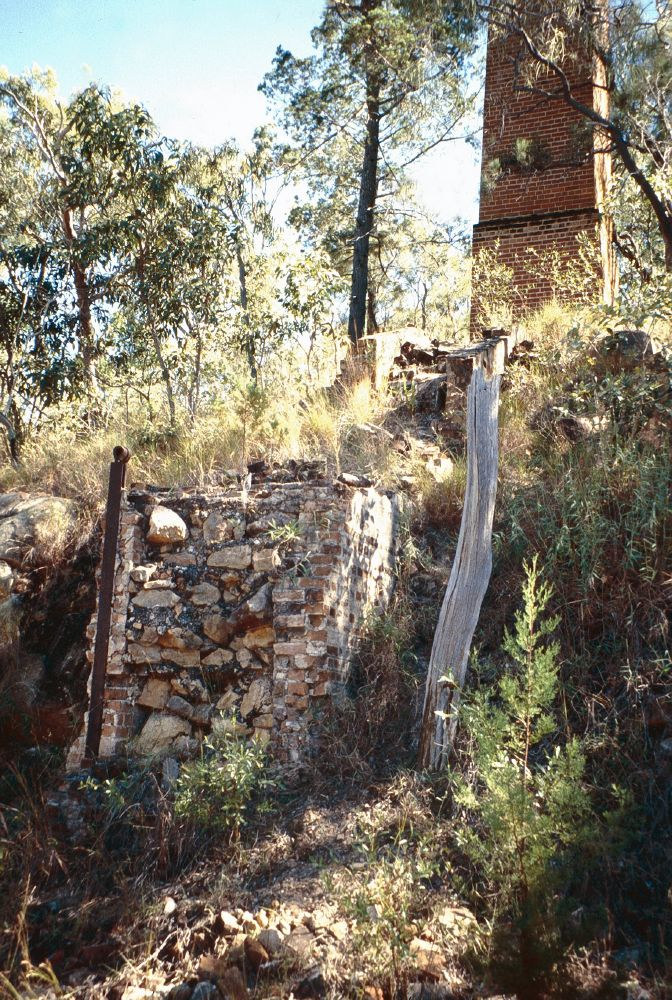
- Coolgarra Battery

- Location within Queensland Location within Australia
- 17.5729°S 145.2065°E
- Location: Coolgarra Station, Silver Valley, Tablelands Region, Queensland, Australia

History
- Design period: 1870s–1890s (late 19th century)
- Built: 1896–1901

Queensland Heritage Register
- Official name: Coolgarra Battery, Coolgarra Old Furnace
- Type: state heritage (archaeological, built)
- Designated: 25 August 2000
- Reference no.: 601791
- Significant period: 1896–1901 (fabric); 1901–1910, 1918–1928 (historical)
- Significant components: machinery/plant/equipment – mining/mineral processing, road/roadway, chute/s, mounting block/stand, flue, chimney/chimney stack, mullock heap, wall/s – retaining, terracing

Coolgarra Battery is a heritage-listed stamper battery at Coolgarra Station, Silver Valley, Tablelands Region, Queensland, Australia. It was built from 1896 to 1901. It is also known as Coolgarra Old Furnace. It was added to the Queensland Heritage Register on 25 August 2000.

== History ==
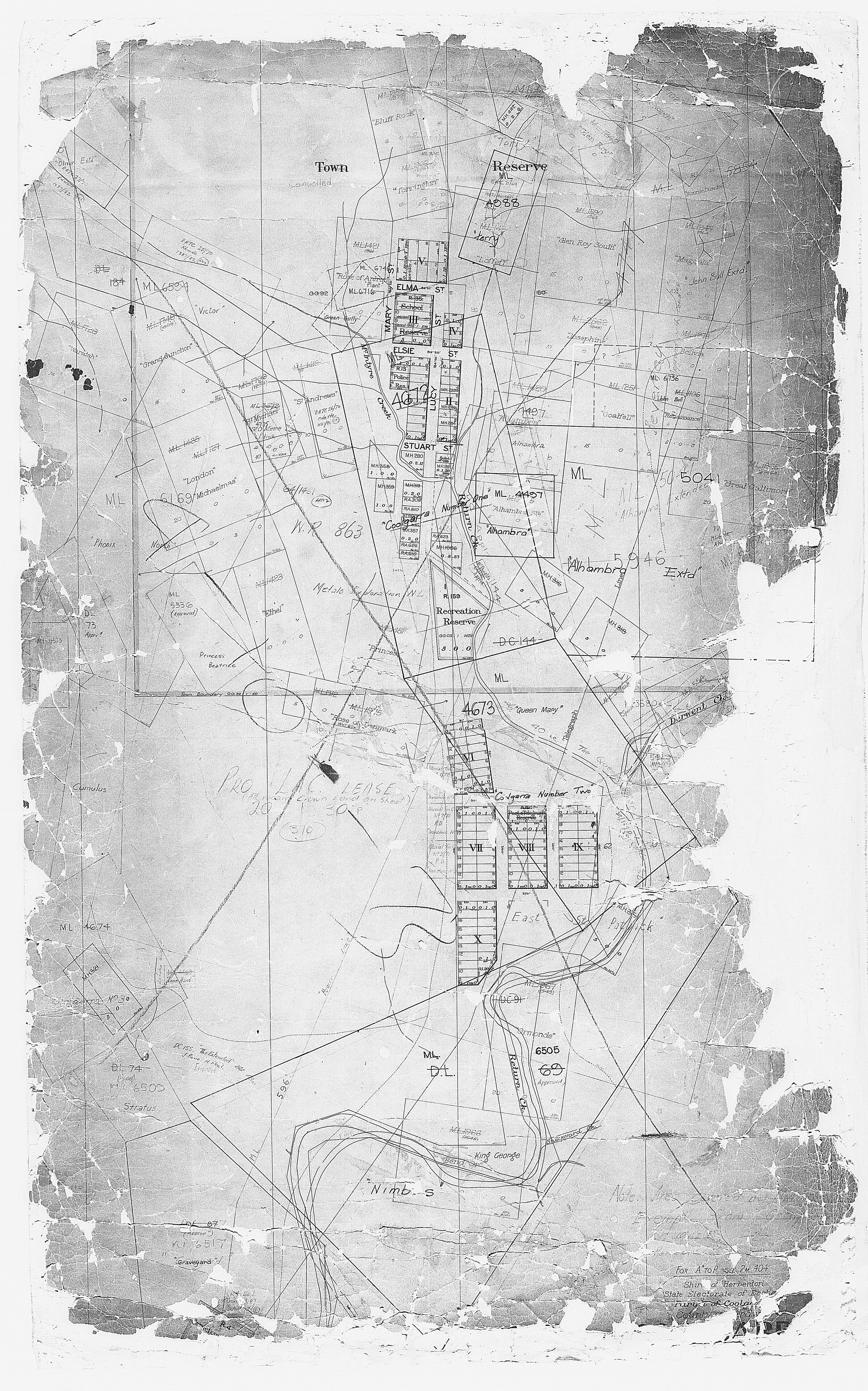
Coolgarra Mine Map (created between 1934 and 1972)

The Coolgarra Battery is situated on Derwent Creek, 15 kilometres (9.3 mi) north-east of Mount Garnet. The battery was constructed in 1901 by John Moffat's Irvinebank Company. When built, it was a modern plant utilising the best and most labour-saving designs. The battery was built to service the adjacent alluvial and lode tin fields. Its location was chosen for its ability to provide an almost inexhaustible supply of water needed to operate the battery.

In 1882 James Venture Mulligan, prospecting at the headwaters of Return and Emu Creeks, made discoveries of alluvial and lode tin which started rushes to the district. At Return Creek, a tributary of the Herbert River, many shafts were sunk on the lode claims and, although no underground workings had begun, mining companies became interested in the prospects. The rush to Return Creek attracted both local and southern investors and when S.J.Delaney applied, on 5 September 1882, for a machine site on Return Creek this encouraged further tin lode prospecting. People began arriving and settling at Return Creek and the first hotel was built in 1882.

The influx of prospectors and investors to the area created the beginnings of Coolgarra, which became a busy tin mining centre. Coolgarra was surveyed on 9 February 1884 by Peter G. Grant. As tin prices increased, many southern speculators were eager to join Delaney and on 16 April 1883 they formed the Beaconsfield Tin Mining Company with a capital of £25,000. They planned to erect a battery to crush, not only ore from their own numerous leases, but public stone as well. However, the machinery needed for these works was delayed, firstly in transit and then later in its construction. The Beaconsfield battery did not begin crushing until March 1884, at the end of the wet season, and the venture failed. During this time, Coolgarra's miners had been sending their ore to John Moffat's batteries at Herberton and Watsonville.

By 1885 Coolgarra was growing, the township with five hotels, and several productive mines. In 1896 John Moffats's Irvinebank Mining Company began building a battery at Coolgarra on the Derwent Creek, a tributary of Return Creek. Extensive preparations were made for crushing and dressing plants and much of the machinery was in place by the end of 1900. The Irvinebank Company's battery, which superseded an earlier small battery erected at Coolgarra by a local man (possibly Dempsey), began crushing in 1901. It was built on the side of a steep sided valley and is believed to be the steepest battery site in North Queensland. Its design incorporated a series of benches and involved the construction of one of the largest and most extensive stone retaining walls connected with a North Queensland mining site. The Irvinebank battery had two log crate dams, the top one known as the Big Dam.

A tramline was laid from the Alhambra mine to the battery. Alhambra was the largest mine operating on the Coolgarra field and was the only mine in the area. Loaded ore trucks ran from the mine down to the mill, while horses hauled the empty trucks back up. Coolgarra's output of tin rose in the years 1901 to 1903, the Alhambra alone producing 20,000 pounds (9,100 kg) worth of tin in that period. The community had grown from 93 in 1893 to close to 250 in 1903. In that year 8,650 long tons (8,790 t) of ore were raised and treated but by October 1903, work was suspended pending financial reconstruction of the company known as Coolgarra Tin Mines Amalgamated. At this stage also, mines were beginning to produce a lower grade ore, which created an overall slow-down.

In 1904 the Mining Warden noted that a period of depression had recently occurred, but felt that a brighter future could be expected for Coolgarra. And indeed, 1906 was said to be one of the better years for the area, with the battery working three shifts a day. However, although small miners and new discoveries kept work going, the larger mines were beginning to slow down. The Irvinebank Company's involvement in the operation of the Coolgarra battery ceased in 1906. A syndicated headed by Fred Taylor kept it operating to about 1910. By 1912 the battery had been dismantled and transported to Koorborra. This handicapped prospectors and led to the decline of the whole area. When the Big Dam collapsed after heavy storms in 1916, only a few prospectors stayed to work the area.

There was a wolfram-led revival in 1911 and in 1918 Bill Craven erected a battery on the foundations of the Irvinebank Company's Coolgarra battery. It operated until about 1928, but nothing of note occurred in the area after that. The site of Coolgarra township was dredged and almost totally erased when the Tableland Tin dredge went through the town site in the late 1970s.

== Description ==
The remains of the Coolgarra Battery are located in a steep sided valley in hilly country to the north-east of Mt Garnet. Derwent Creek runs through the valley, this creek is ephemeral.

The Coolgarra Battery site comprises a series of benches extending down the northwest slope of the valley. A tall, redbrick chimney with a brick flue is the main feature of the site. This is one of only two brick chimneys surviving in the Herberton area (the other one being the Rocky Bluff Battery 15 kilometres (9.3 mi) north-west of Herberton). The flue runs from the chimney to the boiler house site below the stamp battery. An old road curves to the northeast above the mullock heap. An earth ramp supported by bush timber posts has been built below the mullock heap. Below the ramp is a bush timber ore bin frame. Below this a stone retaining wall supports the bench where the stamp battery was located. There are concrete engine mounts and stamper foundations on the stamp battery. Another extensive stone retaining wall, which originally extended for over 110 metres (360 ft), supports the main bench where the boiler house was located - 70 metres (230 ft) of this wall is still extant. Below this retaining wall several more earth benches support the concentration plant site and other infrastructure. The body of a return-tube boiler lies on the banks of the creek below the battery, this is not in situ. There is a considerable amount of iron debris lying around on the slope below the boiler house site, this includes iron tanks and wheels. An iron chute runs down the eastern side of the site, below an ore dump.

== Heritage listing ==
Coolgarra Battery was listed on the Queensland Heritage Register on 25 August 2000 having satisfied the following criteria.

The place is important in demonstrating the evolution or pattern of Queensland's history.

The Coolgarra Battery is significant in demonstrating the evolution of Queensland's mining history because it is an example of ore processing in a remote, difficult site.

The place demonstrates rare, uncommon or endangered aspects of Queensland's cultural heritage.

The Coolgarra Battery demonstrates rare aspects of Queensland's cultural heritage as the steepest battery site recorded in North Queensland and one of the largest and most extensive stone retaining walls associated with a North Queensland mining site. In addition, the site has one of only two surviving brick chimneys in the Herberton area.
