= Wongabel =

- Suburb
- Interactive map of Wongabel
- Coordinates: 17.3336°S 145.4691°E
- Country: Australia
- State: Queensland
- LGA: Tablelands Region
- Location: 7.9 km (4.9 mi) SSW of Atherton; 13.5 km (8.4 mi) NE of Herberton; 85.2 km (52.9 mi) SW of Cairns; 1,695 km (1,053 mi) NNW of Brisbane

Government
  - State electorate: Hill
  - Federal division: Kennedy

Area
  - Total: 43.5 km^{2} (16.8 sq mi)

Population
  - Total: 251 (2021 census)
  - Density: 5.770/km^{2} (14.94/sq mi)
- Time zone: UTC+10:00 (AEST)
- Postcode: 4883
Suburbs around Wongabel
Carrington	Carrington	Atherton
Watsonville	Wongabel	East Barron
Moomin	Upper Barron	Upper Barron

Wongabel is a rural locality in the Tablelands Region, Queensland, Australia. In the 2021 census, Wongabel had a population of 251 people.

== Geography ==
The Atherton–Herberton Road runs through from north to south-west.

== History ==
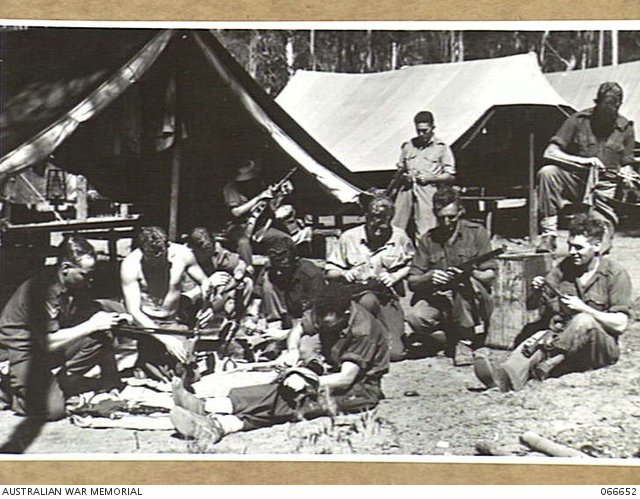
Troops of the 2/4th Pioneer Battalion, Wongabel, 1944

The locality takes its name from the Wongabel railway station, named on 20 October 1910 by the Queensland Railway Department. It is an Aboriginal word meaning wood pigeon.

Herberton Range Provisional School opened in 1909 and closed in 1910. It was a tent school to provide schooling for the children of railway workers living in railway camps during the construction of the railway through the Herberton Range.

In World War II as part of the Atherton Project, tent encampments were established by the Australian Army (6th and 7th Divisions) near Wongabel, Wondecla and Ravenshoe.

== Demographics ==
In the 2016 census, Wongabel had a population of 221 people.

In the 2021 census, Wongabel had a population of 251 people.

== Education ==
There are no schools in Wongabel. The nearest government primary schools are Atherton State School in neighbouring Atherton to the north, Yungaburra State School in Yungaburra to the north-east, and Herberton State School in neighbouring Moomin to the south-west. The nearest government secondary schools are Atherton State High School (to Year 12) in Atherton and Herberton State School (to Year 10) in Herberton to the south-west.
