= Tumoulin =

- Town
- Interactive map of Tumoulin
- Coordinates: 17.5644°S 145.4536°E
- Country: Australia
- State: Queensland
- LGA: Tablelands Region
- Location: 5.8 km (3.6 mi) NW of Ravenshoe; 46.6 km (29.0 mi) S of Atherton; 90.4 km (56.2 mi) W of Innisfail; 117 km (73 mi) SW of Cairns; 1,675 km (1,041 mi) NNW of Brisbane

Government
  - State electorate: Hill
  - Federal division: Kennedy

Area
  - Total: 48.1 km^{2} (18.6 sq mi)

Population
  - Total: 135 (2021 census)
  - Density: 2.807/km^{2} (7.27/sq mi)
- Time zone: UTC+10:00 (AEST)
- Postcode: 4888
Localities around Tumoulin
Kaban	Kaban	Evelyn
Millstream	Tumoulin	Evelyn
Millstream	Millstream	Ravenshoe

Tumoulin is a rural town and locality in the Tablelands Region, Queensland, Australia. In the 2021 census, the locality of Tumoulin had a population of 135 people.

== Geography ==
From south to north Tumoulin is a flat valley with Diddleluma Creek flowing through it, elevation approx 950 metres (3,120 ft) above sea level. However, it is more mountainous in both the east and west, rising to approx 1,100 metres (3,600 ft).

The town lies slightly to the east of centre of the locality. The eastern part of the locality is mostly protected areas including Tumoulin Forest Reserve and Tumoulin State Forest. There is also an area in the south of the locality within the Ravenshoe State Forest No 3 which extends into Ravenshoe.

The land use is cropping on the valley floor, grazing on the lower slopes, and forestry in the more mountainous areas.

== History ==
The Tablelands railway line from Herberton to Tumoulin opened on 31 July 1911 with Tumoulin railway station (17.5641°S 145.4526°E) being Queensland’s highest railway station at 965 metres (3,166 ft) above sea level. The name Tumoulin is thought to be an Aboriginal word meaning waterfall. The railway line from Atherton to Ravenshoe was closed in 1988 due to the World Heritage Listing of Queensland's Wet Tropics. However, the section between Herberton and Tumoulin can still be used and the Ravenshoe Steam Railway operate heritage steam train tours along the route.

On 3 August 1911 the Queensland Government auctioned 59 town allotments in the new town of Tumoulin. The township of Tumoulin appears on a 1916 survey plan.

Tumoulin Provisional School opened on 4 May 1912. In 1914 there were plans to build a new school building. On 1 April 1915 it became Tumoulin State School. It closed on 11 September 1960. It was located at approx 17.5600°S 145.4524°E.

== Demographics ==
In the 2016 census, the locality of Tumoulin had a population of 109 people.

In the 2021 census, the locality of Tumoulin had a population of 135 people.

== Education ==
There are no schools in Tumoulin. The nearest primary and secondary school is Ravenshoe State School (Prep-12) in neighbouring Ravenshoe to the south-east.
