= Moomin, Queensland =

Moomin
- Suburb
- Interactive map of Moomin
- Coordinates: 17.3588°S 145.4097°E
- Country: Australia
- State: Queensland
- LGA: Tablelands Region
- Location: 1.3 km (0.81 mi) NE of Herberton; 17.0 km (10.6 mi) SW of Atherton; 93.4 km (58.0 mi) SW of Cairns; 348 km (216 mi) NNW of Townsville; 1,704 km (1,059 mi) NNW of Brisbane

Government
  - State electorate: Hill
  - Federal division: Kennedy

Area
  - Total: 30.9 km^{2} (11.9 sq mi)

Population
  - Total: 191 (2021 census)
  - Density: 6.181/km^{2} (16.01/sq mi)
- Time zone: UTC+10:00 (AEST)
- Postcode: 4887
Suburbs around Moomin
Watsonville	Watsonville	Wongabel
Watsonville	Moomin	Upper Barron
Herberton	Herberton	Wondecla

Moomin is a rural locality in the Tablelands Region, Queensland, Australia. In the 2021 census, Moomin had a population of 191 people.

== Geography ==
The terrain is mountainous with a number of named peaks:

- Mount Ida (17.3797°S 145.3952°E) at 1,050 metres (3,440 ft) above sea level
- St Patrick Hill (17.3833°S 145.4°E) at 1,174 metres (3,852 ft) above sea level
- Stewart Head (17.3838°S 145.4252°E ) at 1,220 metres (4,000 ft) above sea level

The Herberton railway line ran through the locality but that section of the line closed in 1988, but part of the line remains in use as the Atherton Herberton Historic Railway. There were two railway stations on the line in Moomin:

- Moomin railway station, now abandoned (17.3633°S 145.4065°E)
- The Village railway station, still in use (17.3725°S 145.3864°E)

The Atherton–Herberton Road runs through from north to south-west.

== History ==
The locality was named after the railway station on the Tablelands railway line, and is believed to be an Aboriginal word meaning wasp's nest.

Herberton Range Provisional School opened in 1909 and closed in 1910. It was a tent school to provide schooling for the children of railway workers living in railway camps during the construction of the railway through the Herberton Range.

In 1994 a new primary school campus for Herberton State School (then at Grace Street, Herberton) was constructed in Moorim.

== Demographics ==
In the 2016 census, Moomin had a population of 133 people.

In the 2021 census, Moomin had a population of 191 people.

== Education ==
Herberton State School is a government primary and secondary (Prep–10) school for boys and girls. In 2017, the school had an enrolment of 176 students with 20 teachers (17 full-time equivalent) and 17 non-teaching staff (12 full-time equivalent). It includes a special education program. In 1994, a new primary school campus was constructed on Elwyn Phillips Memorial Drive in Moomin (17.3723°S 145.3790°E). However, the secondary (7–10) campus remains at the original school site in Grace Street, Herberton (17.3805°S 145.3825°E).

For secondary education to Year 12, the nearest government school is Atherton State High School in Atherton to the north-east.
