= Watsonville, Queensland =

Watsonville
- Town
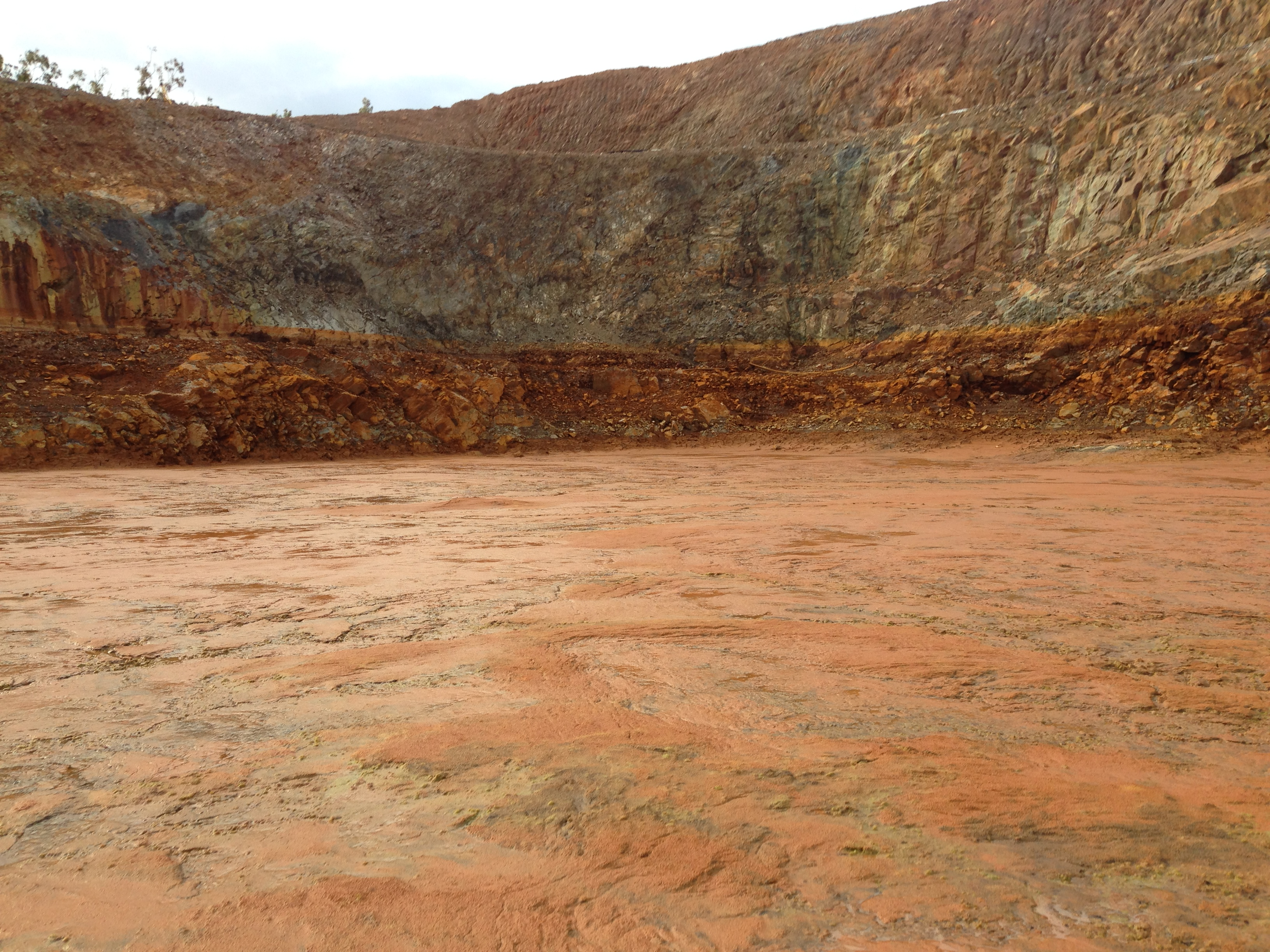
- Watsonville mine pit after the treated water has been released

- Interactive map of Watsonville
- Coordinates: 17.3775°S 145.3133°E
- Country: Australia
- State: Queensland
- LGA: Shire of Mareeba
- Location: 13.3 km (8.3 mi) W of Herberton; 31.7 km (19.7 mi) SW of Atherton; 65.4 km (40.6 mi) SSW of Mareeba; 125 km (78 mi) SW of Cairns; 1,716 km (1,066 mi) NNW of Brisbane

Government
  - State electorate: Hill
  - Federal division: Kennedy

Area
  - Total: 280.1 km^{2} (108.1 sq mi)

Population
  - Total: 176 (2021 census)
  - Density: 0.6283/km^{2} (1.627/sq mi)
- Time zone: UTC+10:00 (AEST)
- Postcode: 4887
Localities around Watsonville
Mutchilba	Mutchilba	Tolga; Atherton
Irvinebank	Watsonville	Carrington; Wongabel
Silver Valley	Kalunga	Herberton; Moomin

Watsonville is a rural town and locality in the Shire of Mareeba, Queensland, Australia. In the 2021 census, the locality of Watsonville had a population of 176 people.

== Geography ==
Watsonville is 107 kilometres (66 mi) south-west of Cairns via the Bruce Highway, Gillies Range Road, State Route 25 (bypassing Atherton) and the Herberton Petford Road. From further west it can be accessed from the Burke Developmental Road at Petford.

The locality is bounded to the east and south by the Great Dividing Range with a number of named peaks within the locality:

- Cave Hill (17.3672°S 145.3178°E) 910 metres (2,990 ft)
- Lion Mountain (17.3530°S 145.3048°E) 914 metres (2,999 ft)
- Mount Empress (17.3643°S 145.3687°E) 1,152 metres (3,780 ft)
- Rocky Bluff (17.2955°S 145.3133°E) 1,030 metres (3,380 ft)
- Specimen Hill (17.3765°S 145.3267°E) 1,025 metres (3,363 ft)
- Wallum (17.2607°S 145.3919°E) 1,292 metres (4,239 ft)
- Western Hill (17.3889°S 145.3122°E) 1,098 metres (3,602 ft)

== History ==
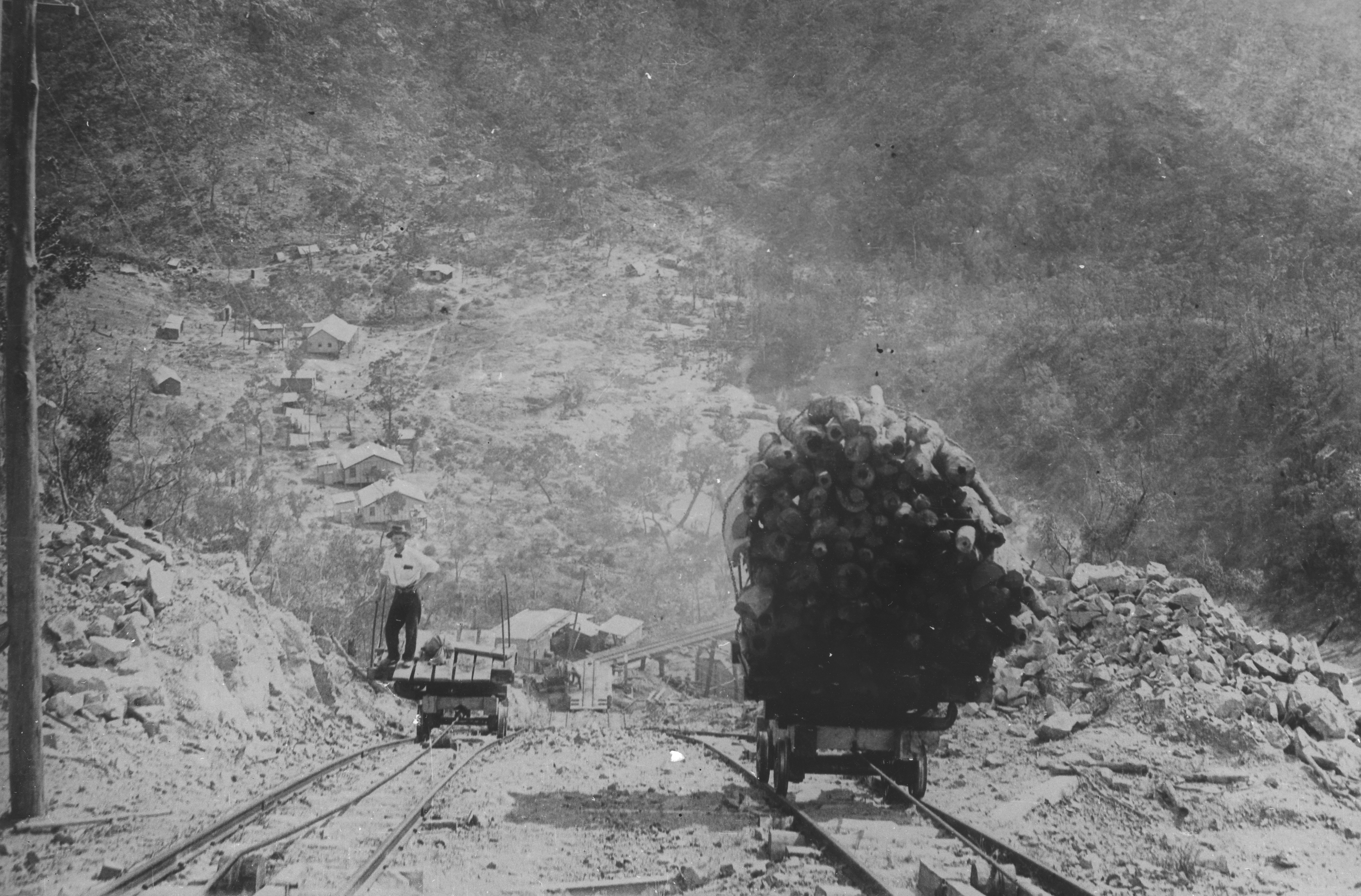
Looking down towards the Rocky Bluff township, circa 1905

Watsonville is a former mining town. The town was named after Robert H. Watson, a tin prospector, who discovered a local deposit on 19 February 1881. The town was surveyed by William J. White on 9 March 1882.

Watsonville State School opened circa 1882 and closed circa 1943. It was located on the block surrounded by Ann, Mary, Ethel and Edith Streets (17.3790°S 145.3148°E).

Although historically and currently Watsonville is with the Shire of Mareeba, between 2008 and 2013 Watsonville (and all other parts of the Shire of Mareeba) was within the Tablelands Region, an unpopular decision that was reversed in 2014.

== Demographics ==
In the 2011 census, the locality of Watsonville had a population of 344 people.

In the 2016 census, the locality of Watsonville had a population of 191 people.

In the 2021 census, the locality of Watsonville had a population of 176 people.

== Heritage listings ==
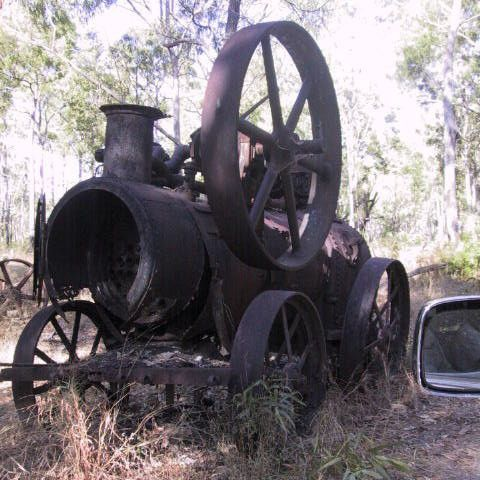
Abandoned mining equipment at the Rocky Bluff Battery

Watsonville has a number of heritage-listed sites, including:

- 10 kilometres (6.2 mi) north-west of Watsonville: Rocky Bluff Battery and Township

== Education ==
There are no schools in Watsonville. The nearest government primary schools are Herberton State School in neighbouring Moomin to the south-east, Atherton State School in neighbouring Atherton to the north-east, and Irvinebank State School in Irvinebank to the south-west. The nearest government secondary schools are Herbert State School (to Year 10) in Herberton to the south-east and Atherton State High School in Atherton. However, for some students, these schools may be too distant in which case distance education and boarding school are the alternatives.

== Attractions ==
Watsonville Pioneer Cemetery is on Watsonville Cemetery Access Road to the north-west of the town (17.3743°S 145.3079°E).

== See also ==
- List of tramways in Queensland
