= Tablelands railway line =

Railway line in Queensland, Australia

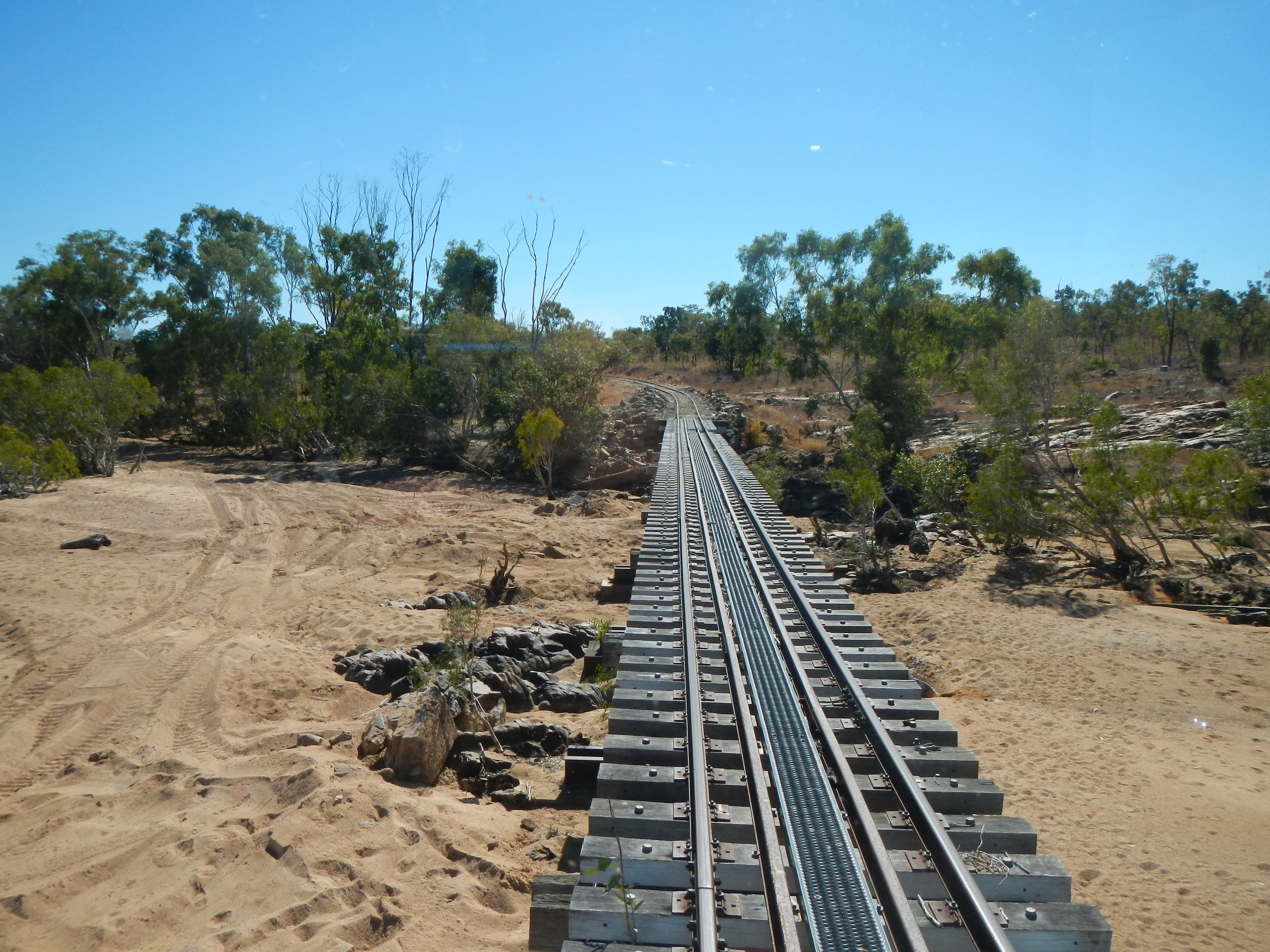

Technical
- Track gauge: 1,067 mm (3 ft 6 in)
- Signalling: DTC from Cairns to Mareeba; Staff & Ticket from Mareeba to Forsayth
- Train protection system: None

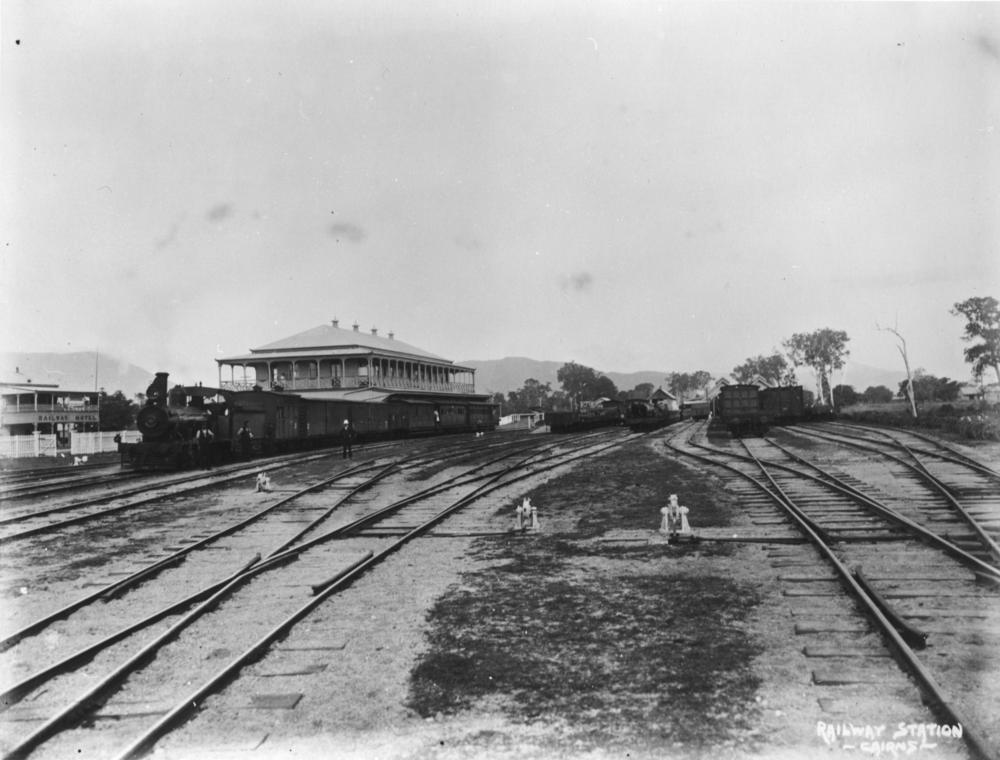
Cairns Railway Station ~1890

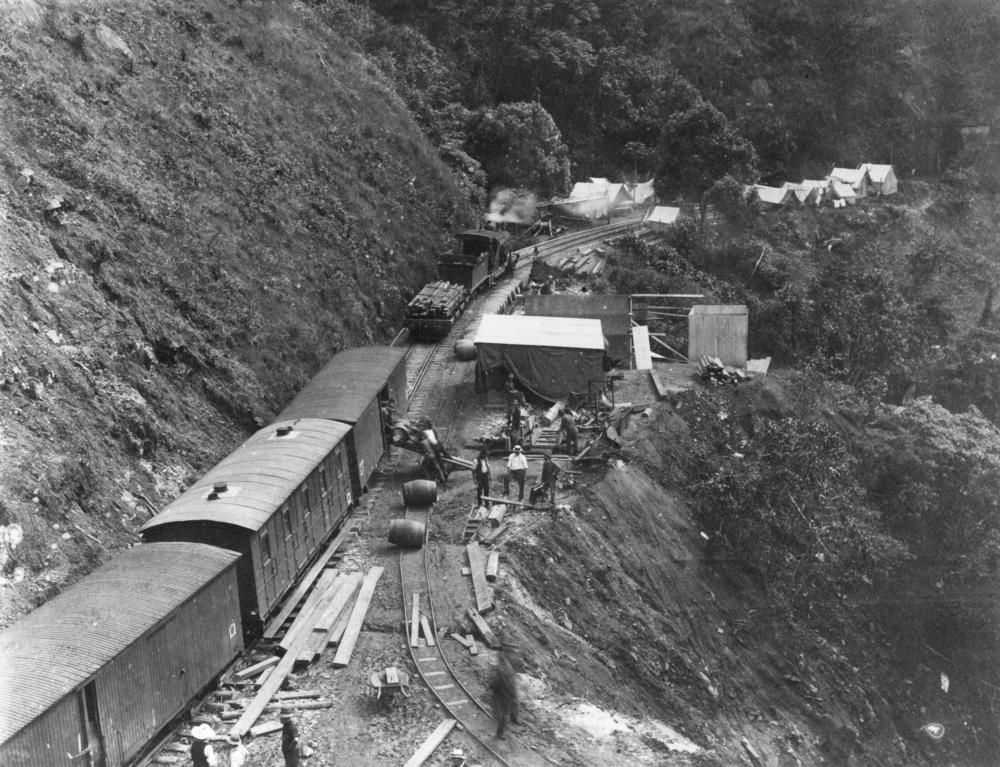
Works train in the Barron Gorge section

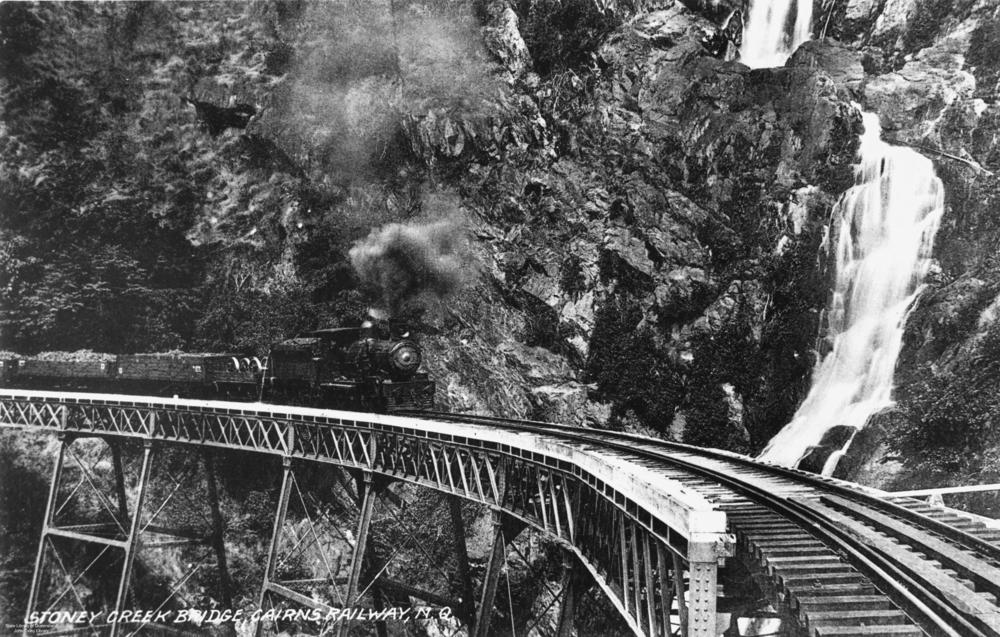
Stoney Creek bridge

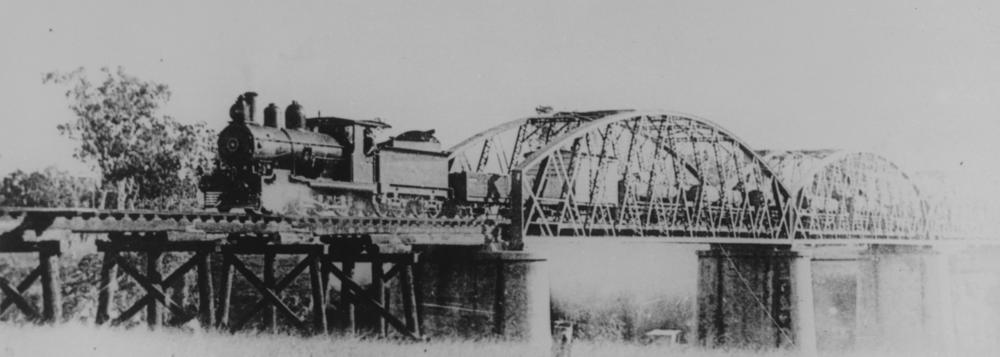
Biboohra bridge ~1895

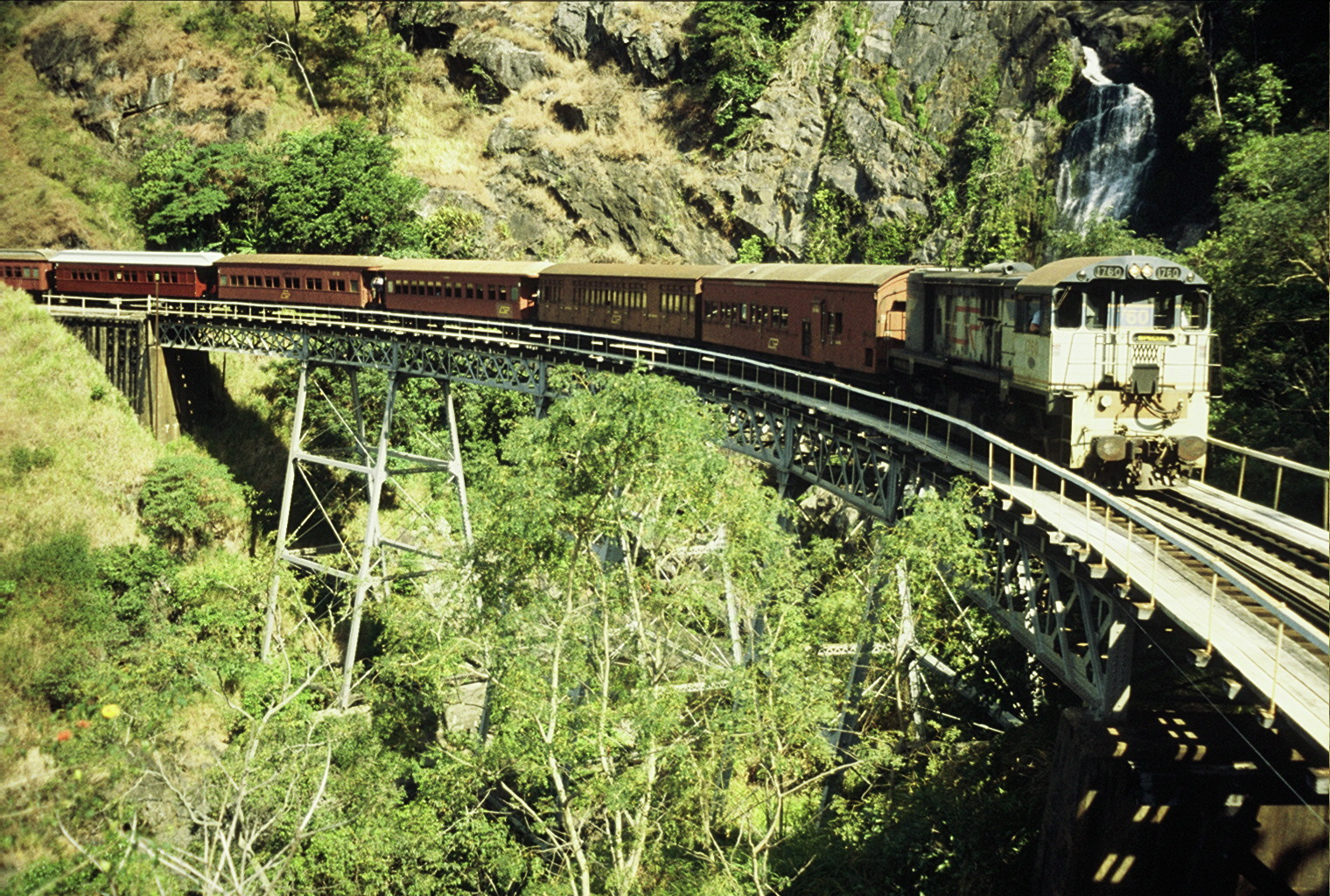
Stoney Creek trestle bridge in the Barron gorge, September 1989

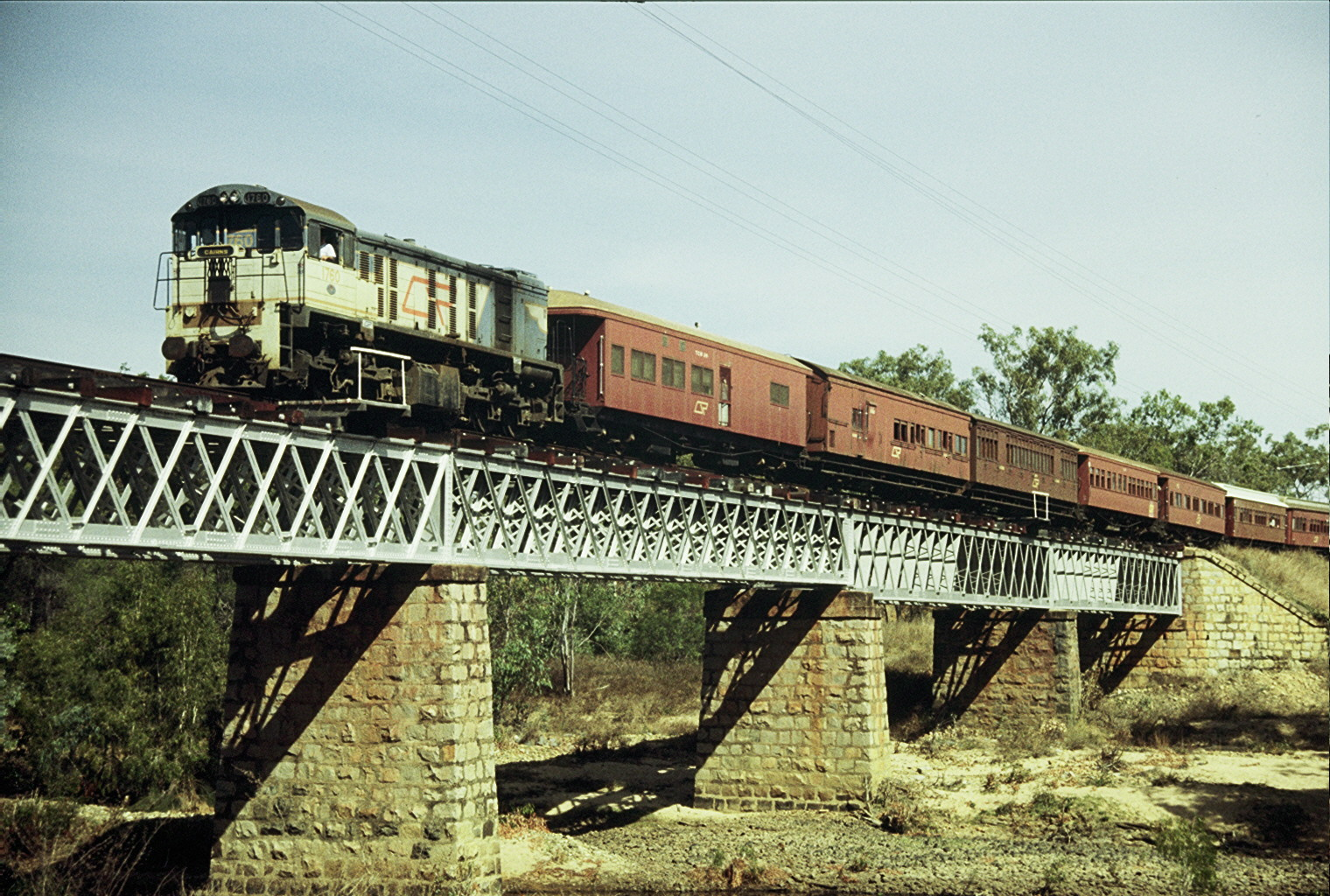
QR loco 1760 hauls a special train on the Mareeba-Almaden section of the Mungana line, September 1989

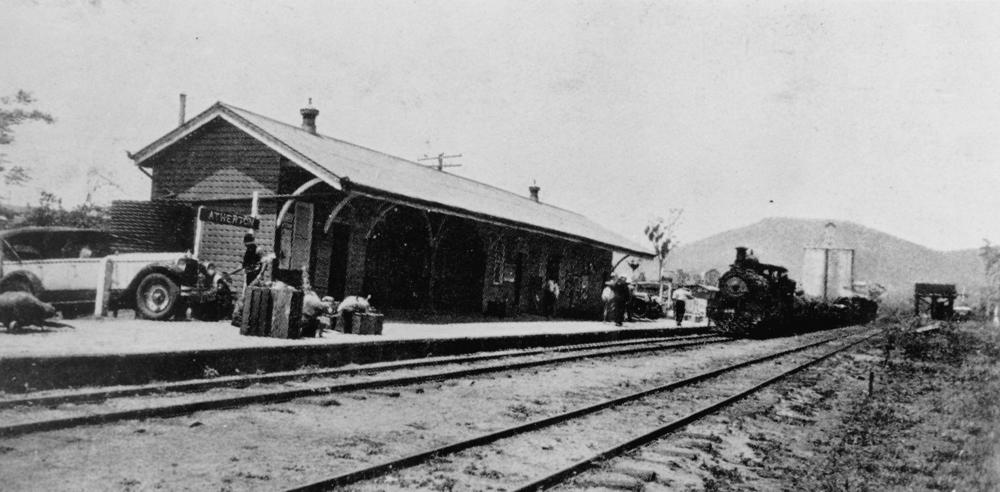
Arrival of the train at Atherton station, 1928

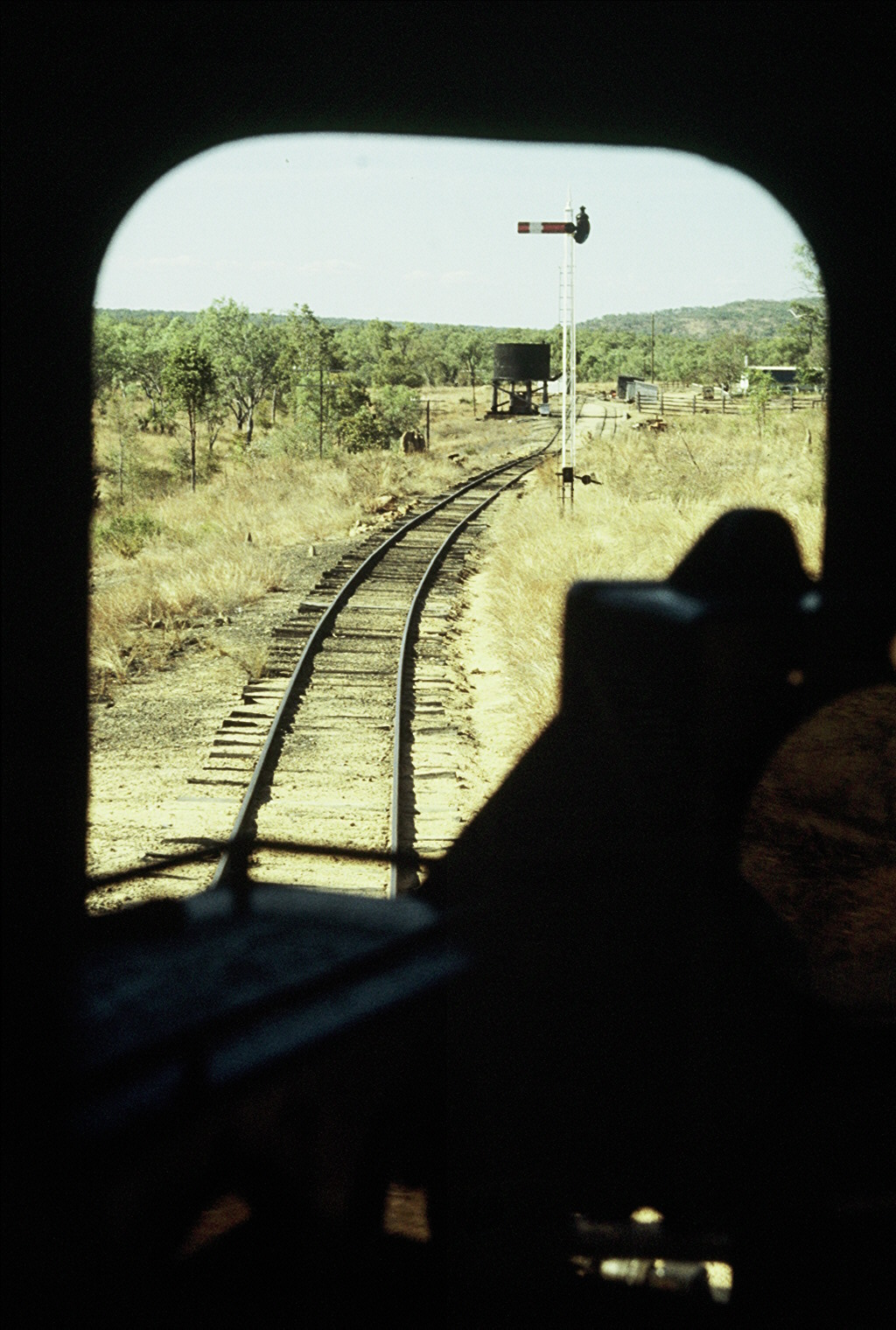
View from a loco cab on the Mungana line, September 1989

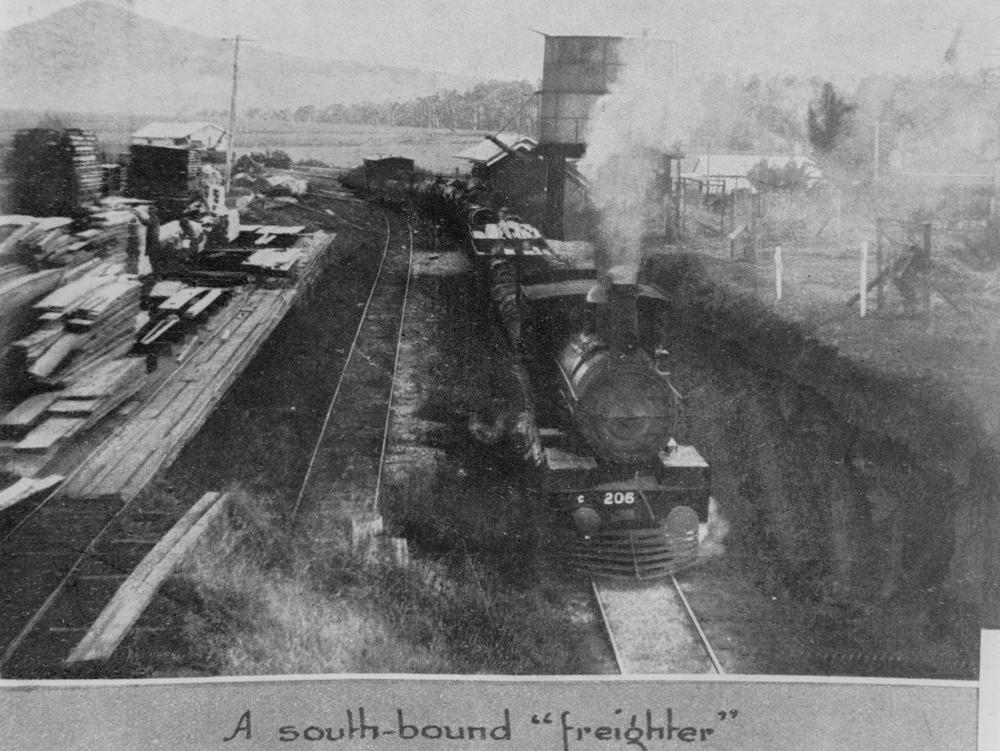
Train at Yungaburra, 1929

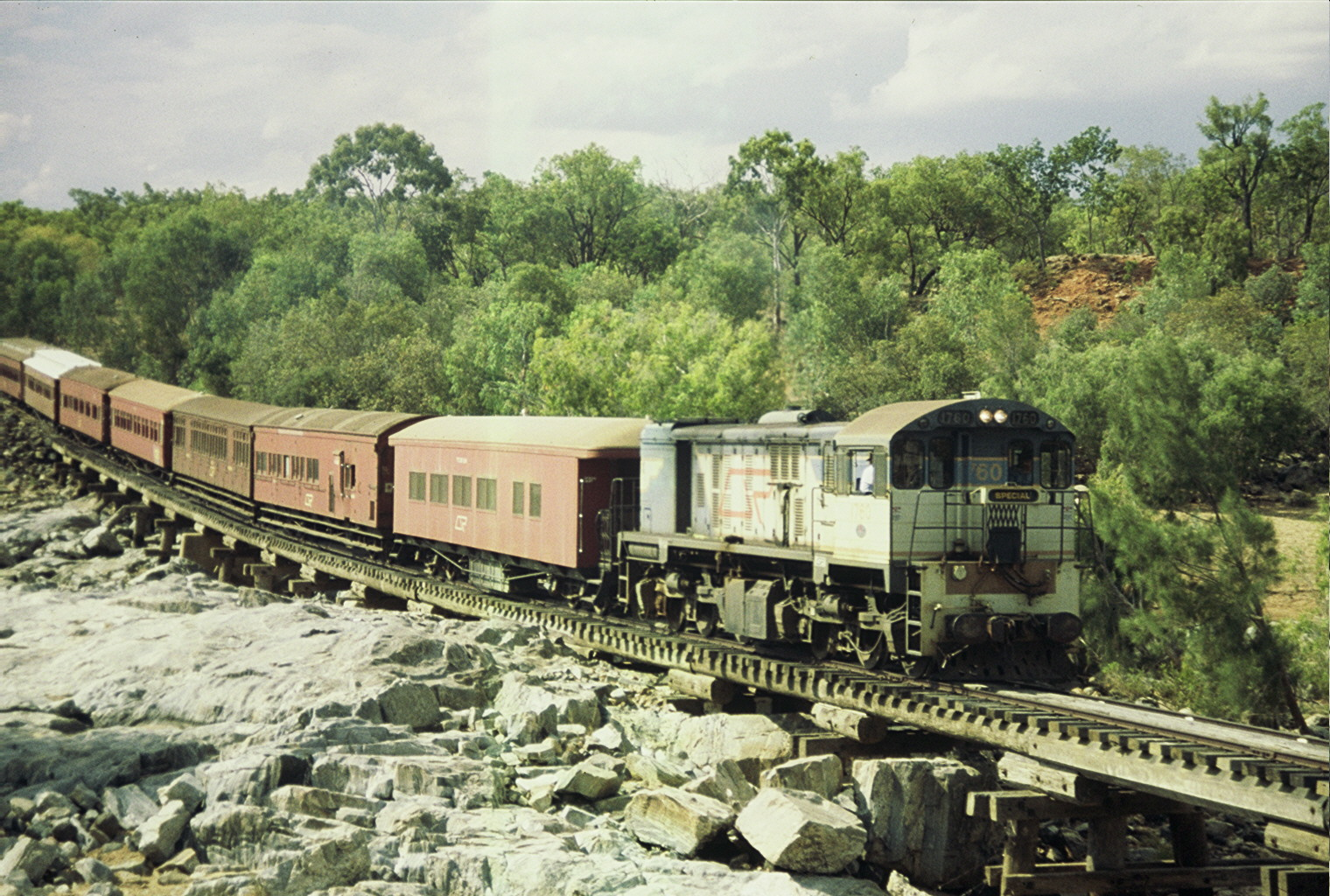
1760 and special train crossing a low level bridge on the Forsayth line, September 1989. Note the short, steep approaches to the bridge, as steep as 1 in 15, known as 'momentum' grades. The bridge is designed so floodwaters pass over it and minimise the risk of damage.

The Tablelands railway line is a railway line in North Queensland, Australia. It was opened in a series of sections between 1887 and 1916. It commences at Cairns and at its maximum extent, reached Ravenshoe at the southern end of the Atherton Tableland. The rail system served by this line was unusual for Queensland in that the majority of lines that connected to it were built by private companies and later purchased by the Queensland Government. It is known for its popular tourist services, the Kuranda Scenic Railway from Cairns to Kuranda and the multi-day Savannahlander from Cairns to Forsayth, which both incorporate heritage-listed sections of the line. Since 2025 the section between Kuranda and Mareeba has been closed to traffic due to damage to the track, which has been estimated to cost $300m to repair the entire line over a decade.

== History ==
Following the discovery of tin at Herberton in 1879, the ports of Cairns and Port Douglas were established, competing for the role of dominant settlement in the area. The summer tropical rainfall in the region made roads virtually impassable in the wet season, leading to calls for improved land transportation in the region. The region to the west of this section of the Queensland coast was relatively rugged, being mountainous rainforest.

Three potential routes were investigated to reach Herberton, via Port Douglas, Cairns and Geraldton (now Innisfail). The shortest route was from Innisfail, but it was the steepest and through very rugged country. The Port Douglas route was the easiest but longest. Cairns had the best port, and the unstable geology of the Barron Gorge was not known at the time.

After extensive debate, the Queensland Government selected Cairns (16.9251°S 145.7707°E) as the starting point of the line, and the first section opened to Redlynch (16.8870°S 145.6967°E), at the base of the range, 11.6 km (7.21 mi) from Cairns on 8 October 1887.

=== Climbing the Kuranda Range ===
The next section climbed the Barron River Gorge reaching 317 m asl using 1 in 50 grades and 4 chain (~88m) radius curves (the tightest used on the system) involving 15 tunnels and several major bridges. The Redlynch section was built with 21 kg/m (42 lb/yd) rails, but in recognition of the high wear the sharp curves would cause, the Gorge section was laid with 30 kg/m (60 lb/yd) rails. This section opened to Myola (16.8017°S 145.6113°E) in 1891, and the line reached Mareeba (16.9928°S 145.4212°E) in 1893. The Barron Gorge section had cost nearly three times the original estimate, and the government, reluctant to commit to any further public expenditure on extending the Tablelands rail network, sought alternative options.

=== Private railways ===
The area west of Mareeba was known to be mineralised, and mining pioneer John Moffat received government approval to build a copper mine at Chillagoe, smelter at Barron Falls and railway to connect the mine to the QR line, to be the same gauge and standard as the QR line. The Chillagoe Railway & Mining Co. was created for the project, but the public outcry over the site of the smelter forced its relocation to Chillagoe, the railway then becoming vital to ship coal and coke for the smelter from the wharf at Cairns.

The 164 km (101.90 mi) line opened to Mungana (17.1038°S 144.3905°E), 16 km beyond Chillagoe in 1901, built with 1 in 50 (2%) grades, 30 kg/m (60.48 lb/yd) rail and 5-chain (330.0 ft; 100.6 m) curves, with its own locomotives but hiring rolling stock from QR. A travelling post office was provided between Cairns and Almaden (17.3384°S 144.6780°E) from 1911 to 1918.

Another smelter was built at Mount Garnet and a 50 km line from Lappa Junction (17.3591°S 144.8861°E) was opened in 1902 with 1 in 40 (2.5%) grades and 4-chain (264 ft; 80 m) radius curves. The Queensland Government purchased the line in 1915, and contracted the Chillagoe Railway to run the line. Traffic was significantly boosted from 1938 when a tin mine was opened.

The 610 mm (2 ft) gauge Stannary Hills Tramway was opened from Boonmoo (17.2456°S 145.0734°E) to Rocky Bluffs in 1902 to serve a further mining field, and a branch built from Stannary Hills to Irvinebank in 1907, closing in 1937.

Another copper smelter was built at Mount Molloy (16.6748°S 145.3346°E), and a 32 km (19.88 mi) line with 1 in 40 grades opened in 1908 from Biboohra (16.9196°S 145.4201°E) to serve it and a sawmill. This line was purchased by the Queensland Government in 1917 so it could be extended to a potential agricultural area, but construction was delayed for 5 years and an 11 km extension to Rumula (16.5957°S 145.3403°E) finally opened in 1926.

The Etheridge railway was a 229-kilometre (142.29-mile) line from Almaden to Forsayth (18.5869°S 143.6028°E). It opened between 1909–1910 to provide additional ore for the Chillagoe smelter. It was built with 21 kg/m (42.3 lb/yd) rails, 1 in 40 grades, 4-chain (264 ft; 80 m) radius curves and low level bridges.

The discovery of coal at Mount Mulligan (16.8563°S 144.8707°E) was a significant development for the mining fields, which were finding the cost of shipping coal and coke from the Cairns wharf a major impediment. A 48 km line was opened from Dimbulah (17.1496°S 145.1112°E) in 1915 using 1 in 30 (3.3%) grades in the uphill direction (1 in 40 for the grade against loaded trains).

The collapse of the world copper price at the end of World War I led to the Queensland Government purchasing all the privately owned 1,067 mm (3 ft 6 in) lines in 1919.

The section of the Etheridge railway line west of Mount Surprise (18.1468°S 144.3179°E) was badly damaged by cyclonic rainfall in 1927, and from that time until 1939 the only service was provided by a railmotor which could haul two small goods wagons. The first diesel locomotive used by the Queensland Railways was introduced that year to enable the return of locomotive hauled trains to Forsayth.

== To the southern Atherton Tableland ==
Although it received an offer for a private line to be built south of Mareeba, the government considered that to be prime agricultural land, and constructed the line itself, opening the line from Mareeba to Atherton (17.2634°S 145.4759°E) on 10 August 1903. By the time the railway reached Herberton (17.3855°S 145.3849°E) on 20 October 1910 the tin mining boom was long over, and the line was being built to facilitate development. The line opened on Tumoulin on 31 July 1911 with Tumoulin railway station (17.5641°S 145.4526°E) being Queensland's highest railway station at 965 metres (3,166 ft) above sea level. The line opened to the timber milling town of Ravenshoe (17.6093°S 145.4827°E) on 11 December 1916. The line used grades as steep as 1 in 33 (3%) and a tunnel at the summit to cross the Herberton Range.

=== Millaa Millaa branch line ===
The Queensland Government also built the Millaa Millaa branch line from Tolga, opening to Yungaburra (17.2707°S 145.5836°E) on 15 March 1910, to Kureen (17.3345°S 145.5962°E) on 18 October 1910, to Malanda on 20 December 1910, to Jaggan on 22 October 1915, to Tarzali on 15 December 1916, and finally to Millaa Millaa on 19 December 1921. The route involveds grades of 1 in 44 (2.27%) and 5 chain [100 m (109.36 yd)] radius curves. The line facilitated the transport of significant volumes of logs for sawmilling in its early years, but once all-weather roads were provided, traffic declined, although the grain silos at Kairi provide significant if seasonal loadings. An 18 km (11.18 mi) branch line from Peeramon (situated between Yungaburra and Malanda) south east to Boonjee was proposed in 1920 but never constructed.

== Closures ==
- Dimbulah – Mt Mulligan 1958
- Lappa Junction – Mt Garnet 1961
- Biboohra – Rumula, Millaa Millaa – Kairi 1964
- Tolga – Kairi 1987
- Atherton – Ravenshoe 1988
- Almaden – Mungana 1992
- Mareeba – Atherton 15 March 2013

== Passenger services ==
In 1936, demand from tourists wanting to travel through the Barron River gorge section resulted in the introduction of what is today known as the Kuranda Scenic Railway service.

A daily railmotor ran from Cairns to Ravenshoe and return.

A twice-weekly mixed train (marketed as "The Last Great Train Ride") ran from Cairns to Forsayth until 1995, when it was replaced by the Savannahlander tourist service.

=== Suburban services ===
Frequent daily passenger services were provided between Cairns and Redlynch from 1927 to 1969.

=== Rail ambulance ===
One of the last rail ambulances in Queensland was based at Mareeba with the last patient transported in 1983.

== Heritage listings ==
Sections of the line which are heritage-listed include:

- Cairns-to-Kuranda railway line
- the former Etheridge railway line

== Gallery ==
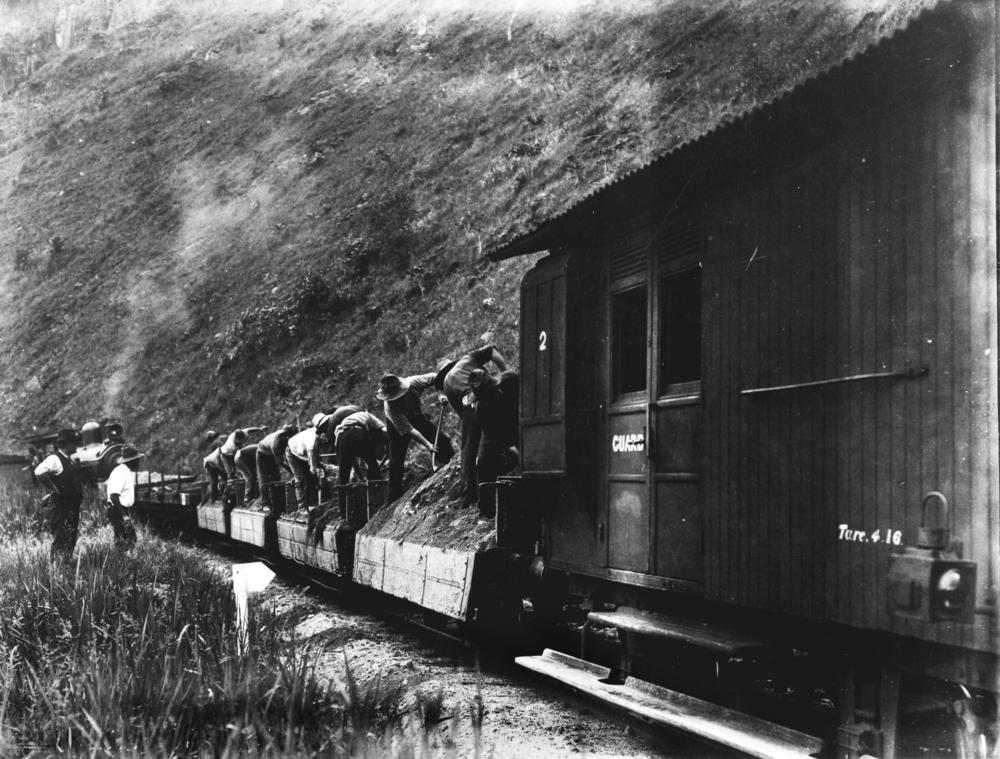
Works train in the Barron Gorge section ~1911

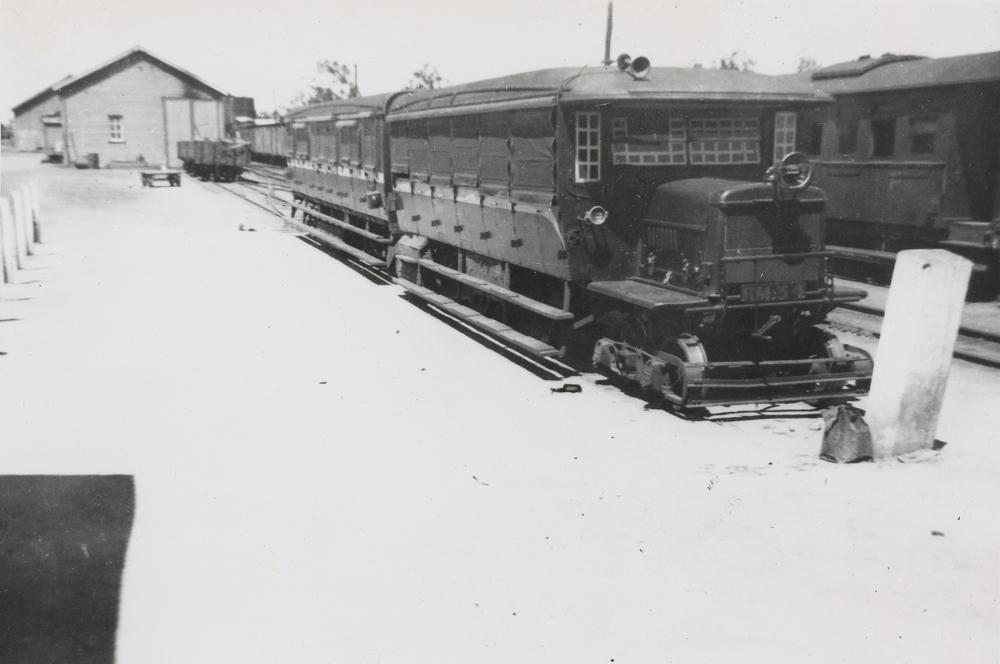
RM 34 at Mareeba, 1942

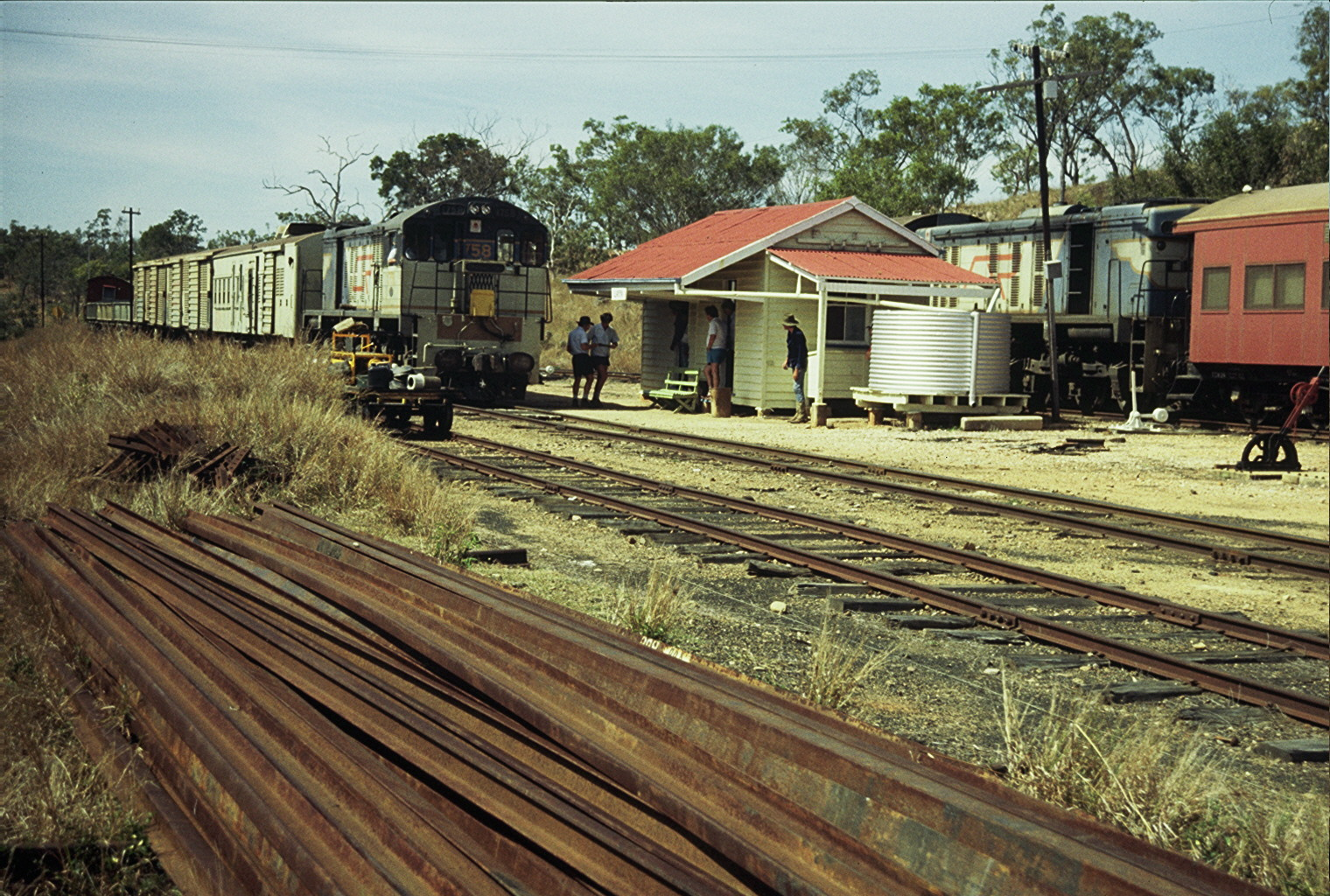
Trains crossing at Lappa on the Mungana line, September 1989

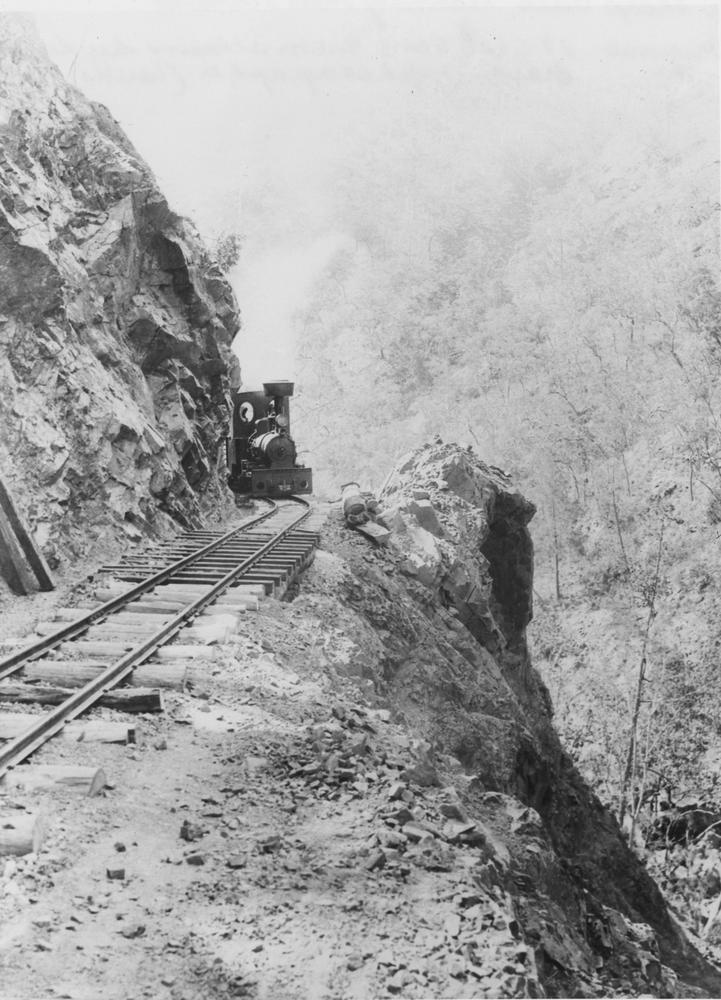
Stannary Hill tramway, Eureka Creek valley, 1902

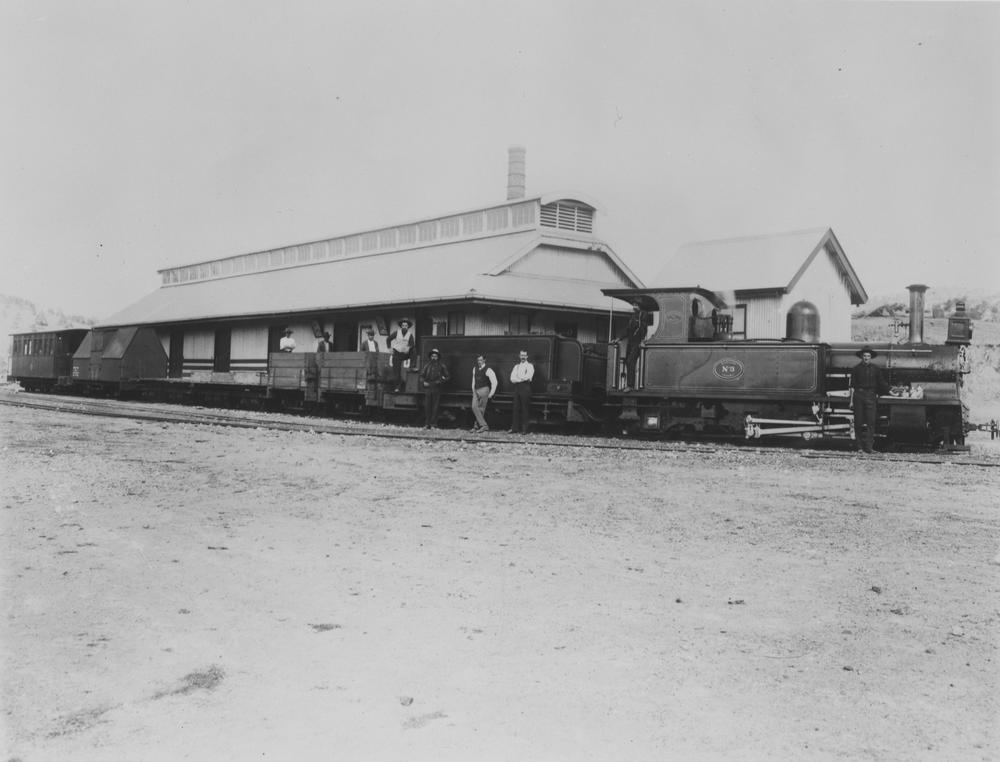
Irvinebank Tramway station ~1909

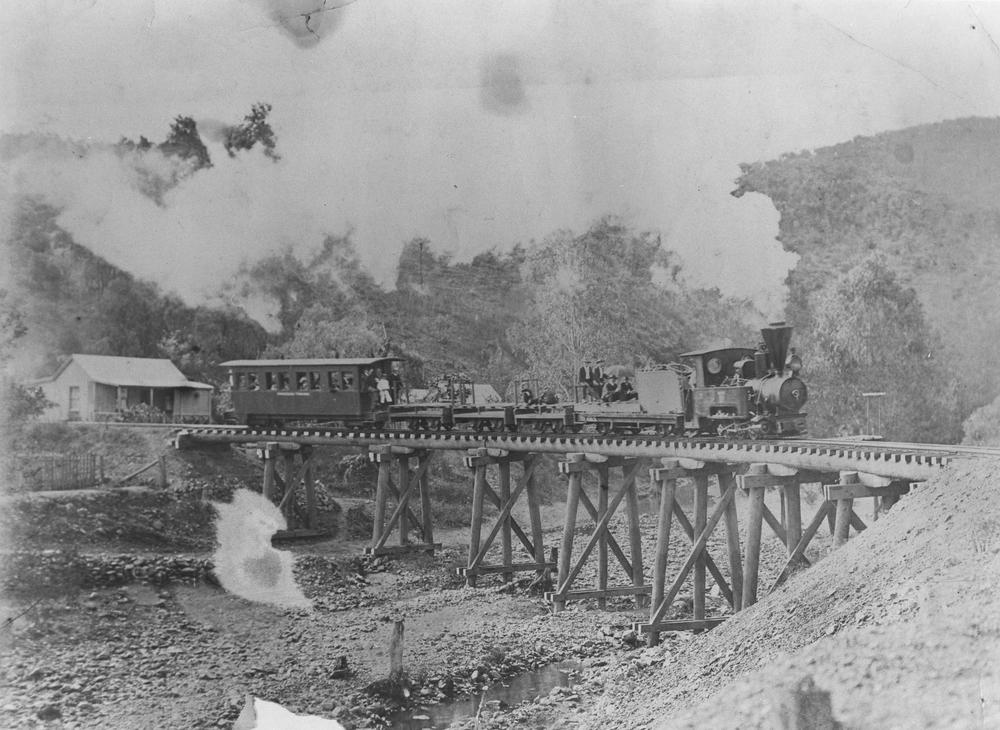
Steam tram crossing Irvinebank bridge over Gibbs Creek ~1911. Locomotive is called Baby and is on a picnic tour to Stannary Hills. (Description supplied with photograph).

== See also ==
- Rail transport in Queensland
