= Ravenshoe, Queensland =

Ravenshoe
- Town
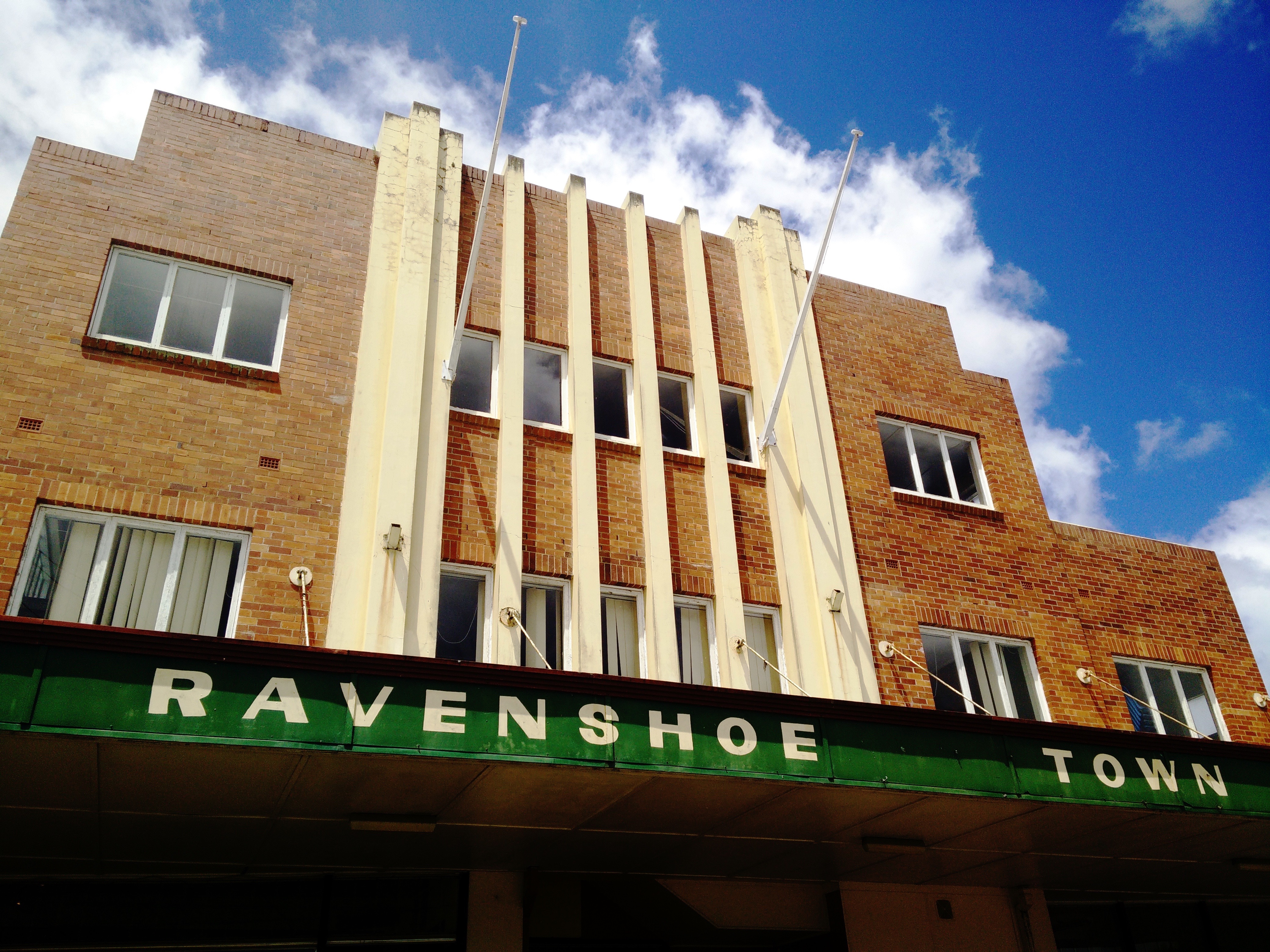
- Ravenshoe Town Hall

- Interactive map of Ravenshoe
- Coordinates: 17.6058°S 145.4830°E
- Country: Australia
- State: Queensland
- LGA: Tablelands Region
- Location: 52.4 km (32.6 mi) S of Atherton; 84.8 km (52.7 mi) W of Innisfail; 118 km (73 mi) SW of Cairns; 334 km (208 mi) NNW of Townsville; 1,773 km (1,102 mi) NNW of Brisbane

Government
  - State electorate: Hill
  - Federal division: Kennedy

Area
  - Total: 139.0 km^{2} (53.7 sq mi)
- Elevation: 930 m (3,050 ft)

Population
  - Total: 1,332 (2021 census)
  - Density: 9.583/km^{2} (24.819/sq mi)
- Time zone: UTC+10:00 (AEST)
- Postcode: 4888
Localities around Ravenshoe
Tumoulin	Evelyn	Beatrice
Millstream	Ravenshoe	Maalan
Millstream	Koombooloomba	Koombooloomba

Ravenshoe (/ˈreɪvənz.hoʊ/ RAY-vənz-hoh) is a rural town and locality in the Tablelands Region, Queensland, Australia. In the 2021 census, the locality of Ravenshoe had a population of 1,332 people.

== Geography ==
Ravenshoe is on the Atherton Tableland in Far North Queensland. It is located 123 kilometres (76 mi) south west of the regional centre, Cairns.

At 930 metres (3,050 ft) above sea level, Ravenshoe is the highest town in Queensland, with Queensland's highest pub "The Ravenshoe Hotel" (formerly the "Tully Falls Hotel" until 2014) and highest railway station. It also has the Millstream Falls, the widest waterfall in Australia. Traditionally the main industry in Ravenshoe was timber, but since 1987, when the government made 900,000 hectares (2,200,000 acres) of surrounding rainforest world heritage listed, the main industries have been tourism, beef and dairy farming.

== History ==
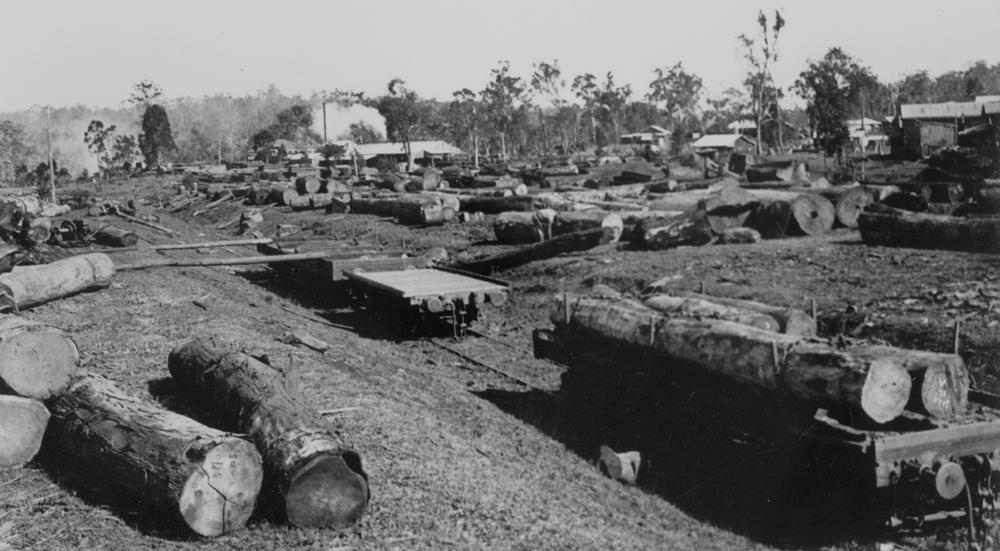
Lumber yard at a Ravenshoe sawmill, 1934

The traditional owners of the land in the Ravenshoe district are the Jirrbal people who speak a dialect of the Dyirbal language.

The site of the present day Ravenshoe was first settled by pastoralists prior to 1881 but when stands of red cedar (Toona ciliata) trees were found at nearby Cedar Creek, the mining entrepreneur, John Moffat purchased the pastoral properties in 1897. A village called Cedar Creek was established. By 1910, the nearby mining town of Herberton has been connected by railway to Cairns and Cedar Creek had been renamed Ravenshoe. The name is supposed to have been chosen because a copy of Henry Kingsley's novel Ravenshoe was found discarded nearby.

Ravenshoe State School opened on 5 February 1912. It expanded to offer secondary schooling on 3 February 1958.

By 1912, Ravenshoe had a store, a school, the Club Hotel and a population of 1,000 people. The timber industry was by now supplying Queensland maple (Flindersia brayleyana), oak (Argyrodendron peralatum) and black walnut (Endiandra globosa).

Geraldton Road State School opened in 1916 via Ravenshoe. It closed in 1960. It was at 45 Geraldton Road (now within the boundaries of neighbouring Evelyn, 17.50658°S 145.50540°E).

Chilverton State School opened on 31 July 1916 "via Ravenshoe". It closed on 1 July 1956. It was at 12280 Kennedy Highway (17.55944°S 145.51721°E), which is in Ravenshoe today but on the boundary with Evelyn.

On 11 December 1916, Ravenshoe was finally connected with Cairns by the Tablelands railway line.

Ravenshoe Methodist Church was officially opened on Saturday 29 May 1920, the first church to be erected in Ravenshoe. It was built from timber and was 30 by 20 feet (9.1 by 6.1 m) and could seat 80 people. It cost £390. It was at 13 Moore Street (17.604858°S 145.481°E). After the closure of the church some time after 1975, the building was relocated to 592 Wooroora Road to be incorporated into a house.

Horse Shoe Bend State School (sometimes written as Horseshoe Bend State School) opened in 1917 under head teacher Mary Ellen Duffy. It closed in 1925 due to low student numbers. The school reopened in 1929 and closed on 1 August 1952. It was at 182 Glendinning Road (17.59882°S 145.54150°E).

Chilverton Methodist Church opened on 3 June 1929. It was built immediately adjacent and north of the Chilverton State School. It is no longer extant, but was at 12280 Kennedy Highway (17.55888°S 145.51693°E).

Vine Creek State School opened on 10 September 1936. It closed on 16 August 1945. The school was at 620 Tully Falls Road (17.6658°S 145.50770°E).

Roads connected Ravenshoe with Atherton and Innisfail by 1936.

On Sunday 25 July 1937, the foundation stone was laid for St Barnabas Anglican Church by Bishop John Feetham. It was named St Barnabas after the Bush Brotherhood of St Barnabas, who had served in North Queensland. On Sunday 14 November 1937, Feetham returned to officially open and dedicate the church. It was built from timber.

On Sunday 6 June 1937, St Theresa of the Child Jesus Catholic Church was officially opened and blessed by Bishop John Heavey. It was 40 by 22 feet (12.2 by 6.7 m) and built from timber. In the 1970s, it was relocated to enable the construction of a new church building, which was made from concrete blocks. The old church building was then used as a school building.

In World War II as part of the Atherton Project, tent encampments were established by the Australian Army (6th and 7th Divisions) near Ravenshoe, Wondecla and Wongabel.

By 1949, there were three sawmills, two hotels, two cinemas, a guest house and two churches.

The Ravenshoe Parish of the Roman Catholic Diocese of Cairns was established in 1949.

St Teresa's Catholic School was established in 1950 by the Sisters of Mercy. The single-room school building was the former Catholic Church at Irvinebank which was relocated to Ravenshoe. On opening there were 60 children enrolled from Years 1 through 7. In 1978 the Sisters of Mercy ended their role in the school, being replaced by lay teachers.

St Barnabas' School was established in 1953 by the Bush Brotherhood of St Barnabas. Reginald Halse, Anglican Archbishop of Brisbane unveiled a plaque on 27 September 1952 to mark the site of the new school, a 100-acre (40 ha) block of land in anticipation of the school offering agricultural subjects. It closed on 31 October 1990. In 1992, the Queensland Education Department purchased St Barnabas' to establish a separate secondary campus for Ravenshoe State School.

Tully Falls State School opened on 9 August 1953. It closed on 31 December 1955.

Ravenshoe Seventh Day Adventist Church is a timber church built in 1980.

The railway service from Atherton to Ravenshoe closed in 1988, following the designation of the Wet Tropics of Queensland as a UNESCO World Heritage Site.

A Kingdom Hall of Jehovah's Witnesses was built in 1990.

The Ravenshoe Library opened in 1992 and had a major refurbishment in 2017.

Ravenshoe became national news after a vehicle ran into a gas cylinder at the Grigg Street 'Serves You Right Cafe' on 9 June 2015. In the resulting explosion and fire 20 people were hospitalised, 8 critically injured. Two people, the manager of the cafe and an 82-year-old Silver Valley resident, later died from their burns. As of 16 June 2015 there were still 7 people listed as critical with burn injuries. Five of them were females aged 43, 51, 59 and 75, and three males aged 56, 59 and 69. All were treated in Brisbane, while the driver of the vehicle that caused the explosion, with a broken spine and burns, was also listed as critical and treated in Cairns.

== Demographics ==
In the 2011 census, the locality of Ravenshoe had a population of 1,442 people, while the town of Ravenshoe had a population of 860 people.

In the 2016 census, the locality of Ravenshoe had a population of 1,400 people.

In the 2021 census, the locality of Ravenshoe had a population of 1,332 people.

== Education ==
Ravenshoe State School is a government primary and secondary (Prep–12) school for boys and girls. The school has two campuses; a primary (Prep–6) campus at 10 Ascham Street (17.6126°S 145.4819°E) and a secondary (7–12) campus at Moore Street (17.6105°S 145.4887°E). It includes a special education program operating at the Moore Street campus. In 2017, the school had an enrolment of 420 students with 46 teachers (41 full-time equivalent) and 34 non-teaching staff (23 full-time equivalent). In 2018, the school had an enrolment of 385 students with 45 teachers (41 full-time equivalent) and 39 non-teaching staff (24 full-time equivalent).

St Teresa's School is a Catholic primary (Prep–6) school for boys and girls at 6 Moffatt Street (17.6113°S 145.4870°E). In 2017, the school had an enrolment of 103 students with 12 teachers (9 full-time equivalent) and 10 non-teaching staff (5 full-time equivalent). In 2018, the school had an enrolment of 94 students with 11 teachers (9 full-time equivalent) and 9 non-teaching staff (3 full-time equivalent).

== Amenities ==
Ravenshoe has a butcher, bakery, supermarkets, two cafes, several craft shop, a post office, a medical centre, a newsagency, a chemist, a hardware store, two pubs, two tyre shops, two salons, four fuel outlets, two caravan parks, a laundromat, bank branches, two real estate agencies and three schools and a community kindergarten.

The Ravenshoe Millstream Country Club has a 9-hole golf course which is claimed to be the highest golf club in Queensland. Camping and caravan accommodation are available on site, for casual golfers.

The Tablelands Regional Council operate a public library at 24 Moore Street.

The Ravenshoe branch of the Queensland Country Women's Association meets at 15 Herbert Street.

St Teresa of the Child Jesus Catholic Church is on the south-east corner of Moore Street and Moffat Street (17.611055°S 145.487°E). It is within the Ravenshoe Parish of the Roman Catholic Diocese of Cairns which is administered from the Malanda Parish.

St Barnabas Anglican Church is at 18 Moore Street (17.610325°S 145.487°E).

Ravenshoe Seventh Day Adventist Church is at 32 John Street (17.604593°S 145.487°E).

Kingdom Hall of Jehovah's Witnesses is at 13 Tully Falls Road (17.61656°S 145.487°E).

== Attractions ==
=== Natural attractions ===
Ravenshoe is located close to waterfalls, crater lakes, swamps, water holes, rainforests and historical landmarks. There is also a diverse variety of plants and animals, including 12 species of possum, 8 species of kangaroo and abundant bird life. In 2005, Malaan National Park was declared over forests which were previously known as Dirran State Forest.

=== Bushwalking ===
Misty Mountain Wilderness trails are a network of extensive walking tracks that traverse Tully Gorge National Park and Wooroonooran National Park. There are bushwalks to the Millstream Falls as well as Little Millstream Falls.

=== Steam railway ===
From time to time, a steam train runs between Ravenshoe and the nearby town of Tumoulin, carrying locals and tourists to and from the local markets.

=== Other attractions ===
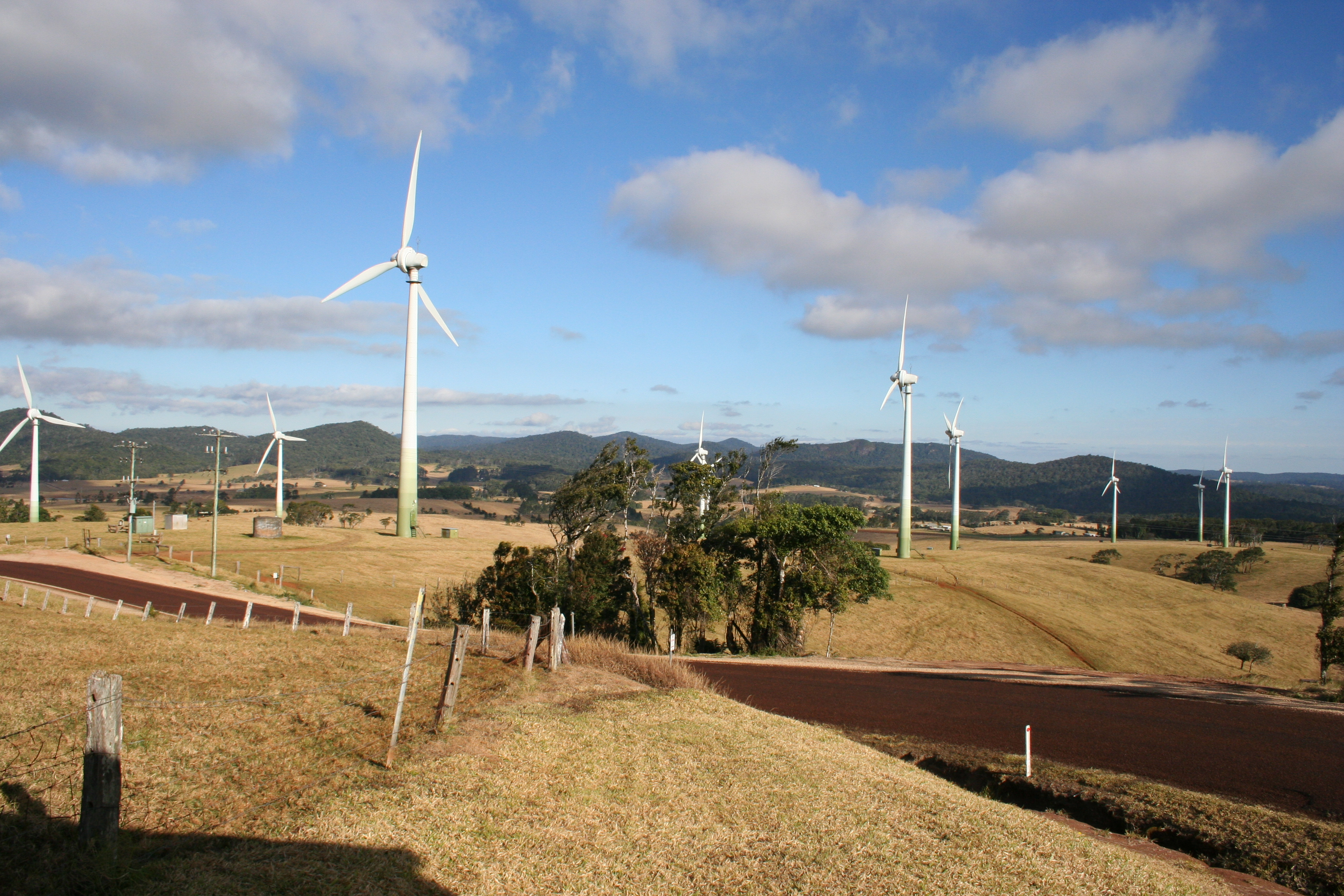
Windy Hill Wind Farm near Ravenshoe

Ravenshoe has a number of galleries and creative industries, reflecting the nature of the locals. The Windy Hill Wind Farm owned by Queensland Government's Transfield Services Infrastructure Fund (together with the Koombooloomba hydroelectric dam) generates enough electricity to power several towns.
