= Atherton State High School =

Location
- Atherton, Queensland; Australia; 17°15′36″S 145°29′9.6″E

Information
- Type: Public
- Motto: Latin: Alis Aquilae (On Eagles' Wings)
- Established: 1959
- Principal: Leanne Knight-Smith
- Enrolment: 781 (2025)
- Campus: Rural
- Colours: Maroon and yellow
- Website: athertonshs.eq.edu.au

Atherton State High School (ASHS) is a co-educational, state secondary school in Atherton, Tablelands Region, Queensland, Australia.

== Education ==
TAFE and Atherton High School were linked through vocational education and training programs. However The Atherton TAFE Branch moved away from the school in 2023, it is now located in a new location in Atherton.

== Cultural ==
Programs in music are available to junior and senior students. The music academy performs at key school and community events. Instrumental music students can have their private tutorials complimented through the school's instrumental music program. Public performance is also enhanced through the drama and dance programs. Opportunities exist for students in all year levels to participate in school shows, musicals, community drama events and state showcase spectaculars.

== Sport ==
The school has four sports teams, competing for three sports titles: athletics, cross-country, and swimming. They are Eacham, Euramo, Quincan and Barrine. Team names signify lakes throughout the Tableland region.

The school participates in many sporting competitions, with students competing in a broad range of sports at district, regional, state and national levels.

== Notable alumni ==
- Dallas Johnson
- Peter Beattie

== Student numbers ==
The following is a list of student enrolments:

- 2020 - 891
- 2021 - 939
- 2022 - 917
- 2023 - 854
- 2024 - 774
- 2025 - 781

== See also ==
- Education in Australia
