= Herberton Uniting Church =

Herberton Uniting Church (former)
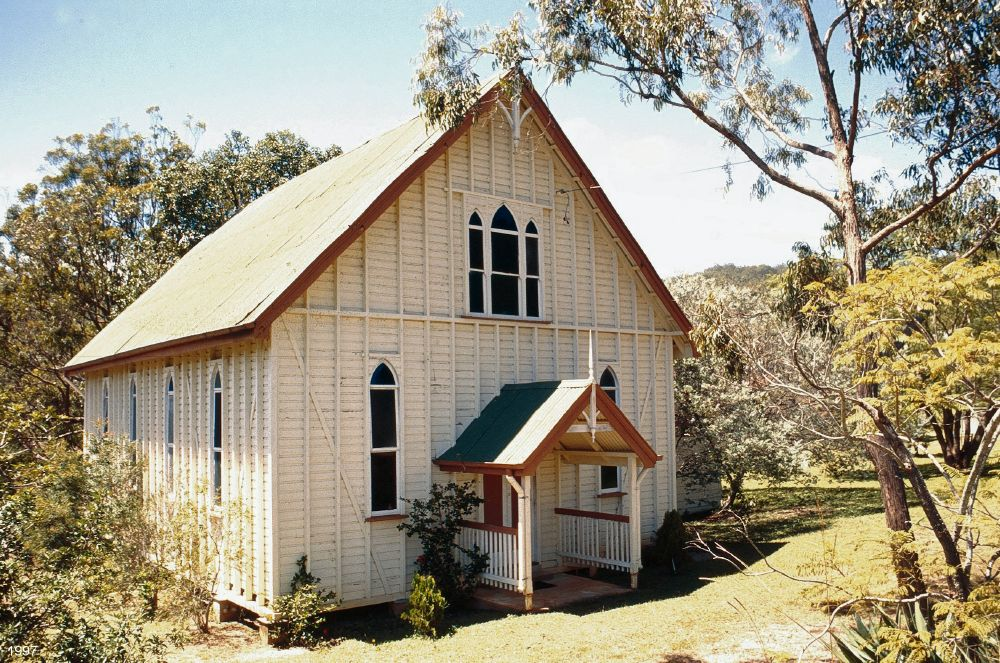
- Herberton Uniting Church in 1997, prior to the 2022 fire
- Herberton Uniting Church (former)
- 17.3821°S 145.386°E
- Address: 2–4 Lillian Street, Herberton, Tablelands Region, Queensland
- Country: Australia
- Denomination: Uniting (1977–2022); Australian Christian Churches (????–2022)
- Previous denomination: Presbyterian (1891–1977)

History
- Former name: Herberton Presbyterian Church
- Status: Former church
- Founded: 4 July 1891
- Founder(s): Mrs Bonar, Lady Mayoress, Herberton Shire
- Dedicated: 15 November 1891 by Rev. George Ewan
- Events: Destroyed by fire, suspected arson

Architecture
- Functional status: Abandoned (following 2022 fire)
- Architectural type: Church
- Style: Gothic Revival
- Years built: 1891–1911
- Construction cost: £400 (1891)
- Closed: 25 November 2022

Specifications
- Materials: Timber

Queensland Heritage Register
- Official name: Herberton Uniting Church; Herberton Presbyterian Church
- Type: State heritage (built)
- Designated: 27 August 1999
- Reference no.: 601788
- Significant period: 1890s, 1970s (historical); 1890s (fabric) ongoing (social)
- Significant components: Furniture/fittings, views to, memorial – honour board/ roll of honour, church
- Builders: R. Petersens

Herberton Uniting Church was a heritage-listed Uniting church at 2–4 Lillian Street, Herberton, Tablelands Region, Queensland, Australia. It was built in 1891 by R Petersens. It was also known as Herberton Presbyterian Church. It was added to the Queensland Heritage Register on 27 August 1999.

The building was burnt down in a fire on 25 November 2022. Police have said they are looking into the cause. Prior to its destruction, the Uniting church was also used for Australian Christian Churches' services.

== History ==
The Herberton Uniting Church was constructed in 1891 as the Herberton Presbyterian Church. In 1977 following the creation of the Uniting Church in Australia, the Herberton church became known as the Herberton Uniting Church.

Both the Methodist and Presbyterian Churches on the Tablelands were formed from Herberton. With the discovery of tin in Herberton, a community flourished and religious groups commenced regular meetings. The late 1880s and early 1890s were a boom time for Herberton with the establishment of the Great Northern Mining Company. From Herberton both the Methodist and Presbyterian churches expanded across the Tablelands, with the Presbyterian church being designated a sanction charge in 1891.

On 29 November 1890, Messrs John Newell, W. Bona, J. Blain, Gordon and Meldrum met in the lounge of a local hotel to discuss the feasibility of forming a Presbyterian Church in Herberton. The first requirement was a minister and, on 13 December 1890, Rev. George Ewan arrived to service the parish on a salary of about £200 per year. Rev. Ewan's parish extended to Irvinebank, Montalbion, Orient Camp, Muldiva, Calcifer, Newelltown, Carrington and Martintown (Tolga).

The first services in Herberton were held in the Herberton School of Arts hall and an organ was purchased for use by the church at a cost of £30. On 18 March 1891 a meeting of parish members and the local council was convened in the Herbertson Shire Clerk's office where a site in Lillian Street was selected for the construction of a church building. The site was levelled by voluntary labour. The tender of local builder Mr R. Petersens for £170 was accepted for the construction of a timber church.

The foundation stone of the former church was laid on 4 July 1891 by the Lady Mayoress of the Herberton Shire, Mrs Bonar. The structure was completed in October 1891 at a cost of about £400. The former church was dedicated and Rev. Ewan was inducted at a ceremony on 15 November 1891. When opened the former church was fitted with red cedar pews, a red cedar pulpit, and the organ purchased for the church and used previously for services held in the School of Arts hall.

In 1911 when the Tablelands railway from Atherton to Ravenshoe was laid, a portion of the property was resumed for this use, changing quite dramatically the setting of the former church. Following earthworks for the construction of the siding, the northern rear corner of the former church subsided and the entire structure was moved about 30 centimetres (12 in) southward.

A Roll of Honour made from copper was erected following World War I. This listed the names of the fallen and those who served in the war. During World War II many serviceman were stationed in this area of north Queensland and many reputedly attended regular services at the Herberton Presbyterian Church. The visitors' book of the former church listed the names of about 400 servicemen who attended services during this period.

In 1959 communion furniture was purchased for the church by the parishioners. A communion table, moderator's chair and two elders' chairs were donated to the church by local families.

Following the amalgamation of the Congregational, Methodist and Presbyterian Churches in Australia into the Uniting Church in Australia in June 1977, the Herberton Presbyterian Church became the Herberton Uniting Church.

On Friday 25 November 2022, the church was destroyed by fire.

== Description ==
The Herberton Uniting Church was a simple rectangular planned timber church building with a gabled roof sited adjacent to the Atherton-Herberton rail line which lines the southern bank of the Wild River through Herberton. The church faced Lillian Street.

The former church was of single skin timber construction with external framing and bracing creating an interesting external surface. The building has a steeply pitched gabled roof which was clad with sheets of corrugated iron. A simple timber finial was fixed to the apex of the roof on the front face of the building. The church was slightly elevated on concrete stumps.

The principal facade of the building, which addressed Lillian Street was symmetrically composed with a central projecting porch flanked by lancet windows. The timber framed porch had a gabled awning which reflected the pitch of the main roof of the structure. The awning was supported on stop chamfered timber posts. Sections of timber balustrade extended from the timber posts to the front face of the former church. The entrance door was a double timber boarded door in a pointed arched timber doorframe. The awning covered a small concrete pad which provided a level threshold for entrance to the building. Centrally positioned above the entrance porch was a three-part lancet window arrangement.

The two sides of the former church were lined with four lancet window openings, reflecting the internal bays. The rear of the former church had a small timber door near the eastern corner and was otherwise plain.

The interior of the former church was a simple single room with high ceiling constructed within the roof space, exposing simple timber trusses. The internal walls were lined with horizontal timber boarding. A timber screen of vertical boarding was fixed adjacent to the entrance door creating an entrance vestibule.

Internally the building contained many early significant elements which contributed to the documentation of the place's history. Such elements included a red cedar pulpit fixed to the rear wall of the church and comprised a moulded and panelled reredos surmounted by decorative carved timber panels and into which was incorporated a stool, in front of this was a three sided enclosure of timber moulded panels which was reached via three timber steps. The pulpit featured several carved timber finials in the shape of acorns. Other significant items included marble tablets, one commemorating parishioners who fought in World War I, another to the remembrance of Rev. J. D. Marly; and an unusual Roll of Honour made from beaten copper also commemorating those who fought during World War I.

The red cedar pews within the former church dated from the original building and were simple seats with railed backs and carved pew ends. The organ which dated from the earliest services held by the Uniting Church in the Herberton School of Arts was also an unusual and significant feature. The communion furniture included a table, moderator's chairs, and two elder's chairs all of which were made of timber.

== Heritage listing ==
The former Herberton Uniting Church was listed on the Queensland Heritage Register on 27 August 1999 having satisfied the following criteria.

The place is important in demonstrating the evolution or pattern of Queensland's history.

The former Herberton Uniting Church, constructed in 1891 as the Herberton Presbyterian Church demonstrated the development of the Presbyterian Church in Queensland. The development of the Presbyterian Church in the Tablelands area of north Queensland originated with the Herberton parish. The church also demonstrated the growth of Herberton as a mining town during the 1880s and 1890s following the discovery of tin and other metals.

The place is important in demonstrating the principal characteristics of a particular class of cultural places.

The building, prior to the 2002 fire, was a good example of a simple timber ecclesiastical building peculiar to Queensland with its single skinned construction and external frame.

The place is important because of its aesthetic significance.

The building, prior to the 2002 fire, was a good example of a simple timber ecclesiastical building peculiar to Queensland with its single skinned construction and external frame.

The place has a strong or special association with a particular community or cultural group for social, cultural or spiritual reasons.

The former Herberton Uniting Church had social value as a place of public worship for about 108 years. The early Presbyterian community funded the acquisition of land and the erection of the original building and, since then, parishioners donated various fittings and fixtures which created strong ties to the community. The social value of the place was further emphasised by the two Rolls of Honour within the building commemorating World War I.
