= William Henley Rawlings =

Australian politician

The Hon William Rawlings

Member of the Queensland Legislative Assembly for Woothakata
- In office 20 May 1893 – 11 April 1896
- Preceded by: William Little
- Succeeded by: John Newell

Member of the Queensland Legislative Council
- In office 12 July 1906 – 5 August 1906

Personal details
- Born: William Henley Rawlings; 14 October 1848 Bristol, England
- Died: 5 August 1906 (aged 57) Brisbane, Queensland, Australia
- Resting place: Toowong Cemetery
- Party: Labour Party
- Occupation: Union organiser, Miner

William Henley Rawlings (28 February 1848 – 5 August 1906) was a member of both the Queensland Legislative Council and the Queensland Legislative Assembly.

== Early life ==
Rawlings was born near Bristol, England, to William Rawlings and his wife Margaret Eliza (née Edwards). Trained for the sea, he sailed to Sydney in 1869 and on to New Zealand where he engaged in seafaring on the west coast for several years. In 1875, he was back in Australia and working as a miner in the Parkes goldfields.

Moving to Queensland and settling in the Herberton district in 1883, he undertook several jobs including labourer, assayer, miner, and prospector. By 1890, he was working as an Organiser for the Charters Towers Miners' Union.

== Political career and death ==
Rawlings was nominated as the Labour Party candidate for the seat of Woothakata in the 1893 colonial election. Victorious over his competitors William Little and W.M. Bonar, he held the seat for three years before losing to John Newell in the 1896 election.

Rawlings was appointed to the Queensland Legislative Council in July 1906 but served for less than a month before his death in August of that year. His funeral proceeded from the home of Michael Woods at Spring Hill to Parliament House, and then on to the Toowong Cemetery.

Parliament of Queensland
Preceded by William Little	Member for Woothakata; 1893–1896	Succeeded by John Newell
