= John Moffat (mining pioneer) =

British mining pioneer

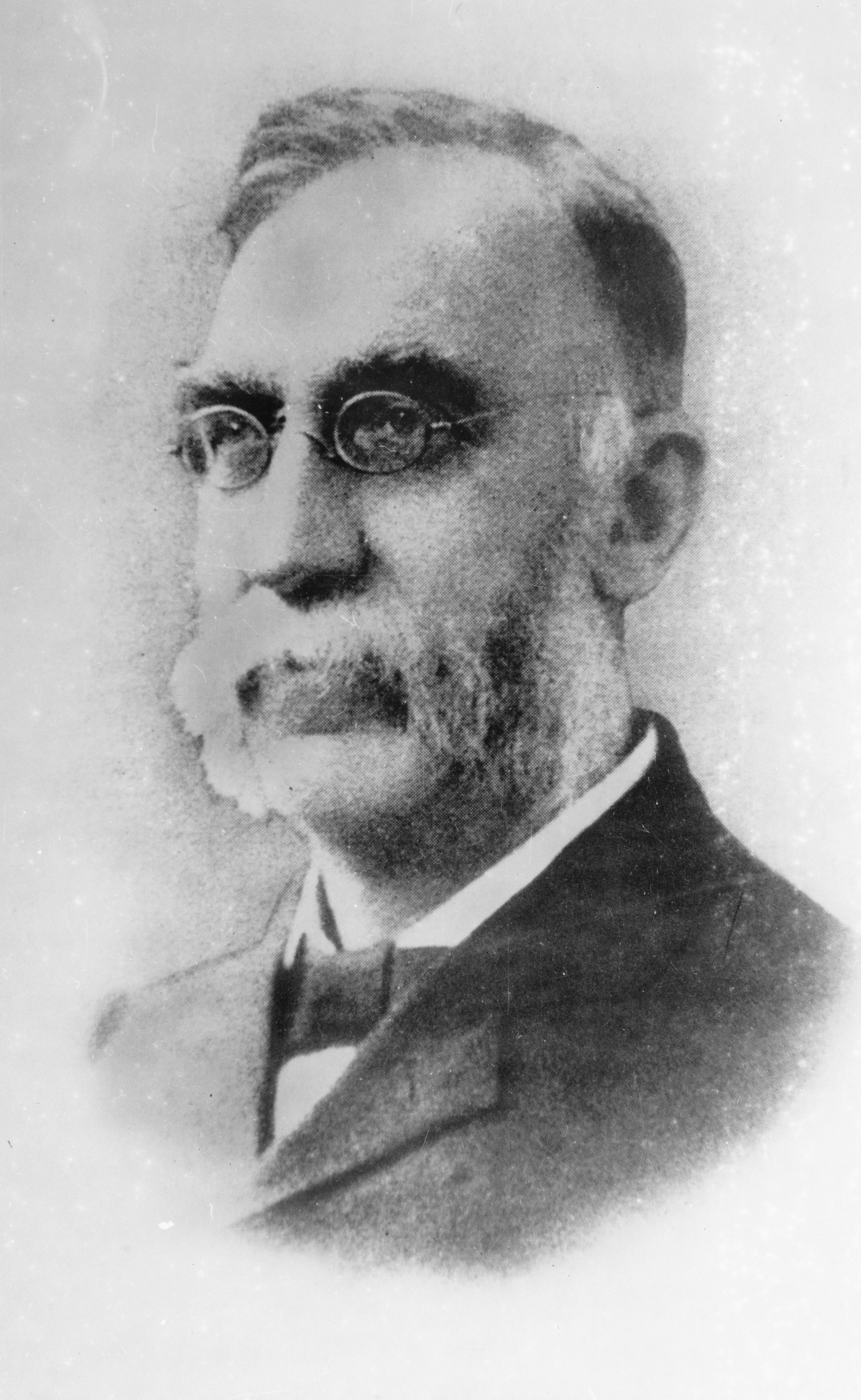
John Moffat, 1904

John Moffat (26 May 1841 – 28 June 1918) was a Scottish-born entrepreneur who developed a mining and industrial empire around Loudoun Mill and Irvinebank in North Queensland which drove the development of north-eastern Australia. He was a devout Swedenborgian who was famous for both vision and enterprise. He was born in Newmilns (New Mills), Ayrshire, Scotland, and spent most of his youth immersed in books. Extremely shy in temperament, he was known to hide whenever visitors approached. It was a habit he was to retain throughout his life.

== Career ==
=== Emigration to Australia ===
After learning bookkeeping and working as a clerk in Newmilns and Glasgow, he emigrated to Australia, where he worked as a shepherd on the Mount Abundance pastoral station, west of Brisbane.

He was known to carry a large swag of books and stuffed his saddle-bags with philosophy, theology, engineering and science books.

He entered into business with Brisbane storekeeper, Robert Love. A lot of custom started coming from the tin-fields of Stanthorpe. Moffat started a branch of the business on the tin fields where he traded goods for tin. He used his intelligence and savings to invest in the best prospects on the field.

=== Tin smelter ===
Moffat established the Tent Hill smelter in Stanthorpe, but it was financially unsuccessful.

In 1880, two of his former employees, William Jack and John Newell, found tin at Herberton on Atherton Tablelands.

=== The Tinaroo field ===
The area was known to have abundant resources of tin on what became known as the Tinaroo field, site of today's Lake Tinaroo. While prospecting there, Jack and Newell met John Atherton, an early settler knew that the first European explorer in that region, James Venture Mulligan had noticed rich deposits of tin ore on the Wild River, higher up in the 'wild ranges' in 1875. Atherton led Jack and Newell on an exploratory expedition to the area in 1879 but the party failed to find the rich alluvial deposits that had been noted by Mulligan. In 1880, a second expedition located the deposit and secured a claim for Moffat and Company. The town of Herberton was officially laid out in August of that year.

=== Great Northern mining company ===
Upon receiving samples of the ore and assaying them himself, John Moffat immediately departed for Herberton. Realising the value of the lode and the abundant resources he was surrounded by, he instigated the Great Northern Mining company, arranged to have a mill and smelter built and embarked on a fact-finding and purchasing trip in Europe.

=== Foundation of Irvinebank ===
Moffat returned to the Great Northern Mine and Mill in Herberton and learned of a new find 27 km to the west. After surveying the site, he founded a settlement there which he named 'Irvinebank', after the River Irvine of his birthplace, in Scotland. He used the latest knowledge and technology he had found in England, Scotland, Belgium and Germany, along with the finance raised, to develop the field and surrounding regions. John Moffat lived in Irvinebank from 1884 to 1912 and from there helped spur the development of north-eastern Australia by building mines, mills, smelters, towns, railways, tramways, aerial cableways and other infrastructure.

=== Moffat-Virtue company ===
Moffat co-founded the Moffat-Virtue company with William Wright Virtue, an engineer who patented several improvements to sheep shearing devices, and by 1914 Moffat-Virtue was a household name in rural Australia.

=== Philanthropy ===
He always recognised the importance of community, especially in the harsh and remote frontier of northern Australia, and always initiated and supported cultural infrastructure such as transport, School of Arts (mechanics' institutes) libraries, churches and other cultural institutions. This attracted families and permanent settlers who established themselves in a harsh and inhospitable environment.

== Awards ==
In 2018, John Moffat was inducted into the Queensland Business Leaders Hall of Fame.
