= Jack & Newell General Store, Herberton =

Jack & Newell General Store
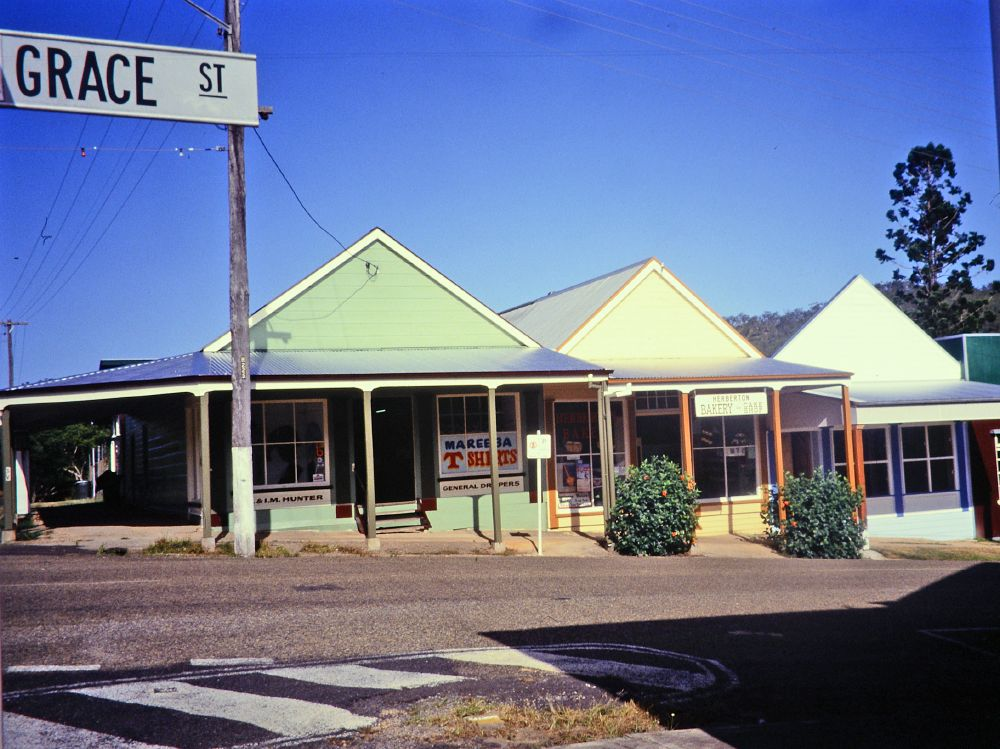
- Jack & Newell General Store, 1992

- Location within Queensland Location within Australia
- 17.3835°S 145.3849°E
- Location: Grace Street, Herberton, Tablelands Region, Queensland, Australia

History
- Design period: 1870s–1890s (late 19th century)
- Built: c. 1882, 1895

Queensland Heritage Register
- Official name: Jack & Newell General Store & Petrol Bowser (former)
- Type: state heritage (built)
- Designated: 22 April 1993
- Reference no.: 600539
- Significant period: 1880s, 1890s (fabric) c. 1882–1977 (historical use)
- Significant components: petrol – bowser, furniture/fittings, shed/s

Jack & Newell General Store is a heritage-listed pair of shops at Grace Street, Herberton, Tablelands Region, Queensland, Australia. They were built c. 1882 and in 1895. It was added to the Queensland Heritage Register on 22 April 1993.

== History ==
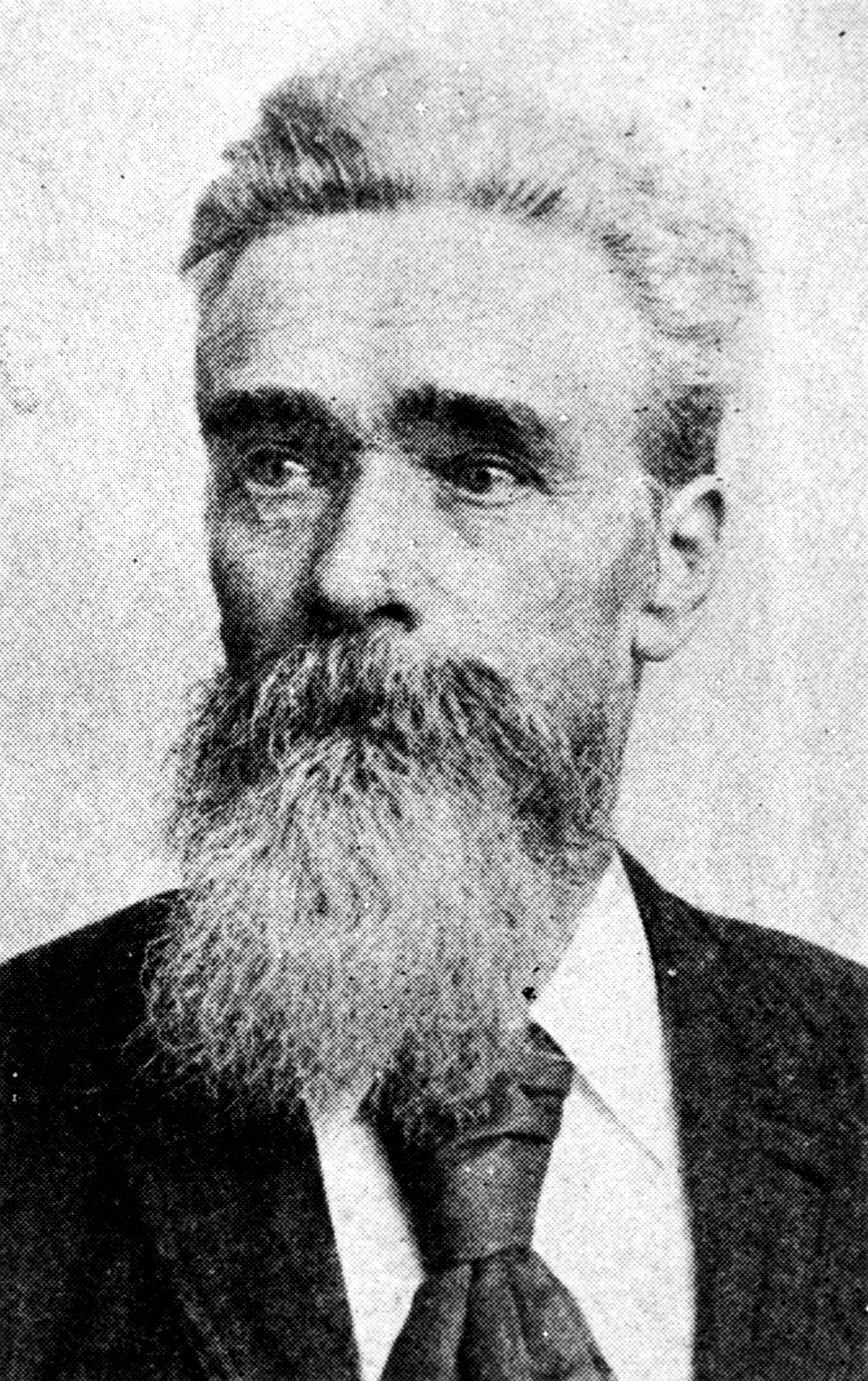
William Jack, early explorer in the Herberton District Queensland

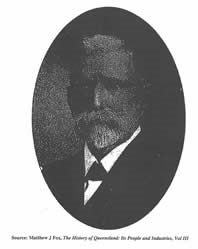
John Newell

The southeastern building of this pair of single-storeyed timber buildings was erected c. 1882 for William Jack, storekeeper, of Herberton. It was the first in a chain of general stores erected by William Jack and John Newell in North Queensland during the last two decades of the 19th century. The northwestern building was erected by 1895.

Herberton owes its existence to the April 1880 discovery of a substantial tin reef in the vicinity, by experienced miners and prospectors William Jack, John Newell, Thomas Brandon and John Brown. In partnership, Jack, Newell, Brandon and William Joss (who had bought out Brown) secured about 60 acres (24 ha) of freehold near the present town, and named their claim the Great Northern. A rush followed almost immediately, and by August 1880, when Warden Mowbray laid out the town of Herberton (so named by Jack and his partners because of its proximity to the Wild River, the head of the Herbert River), it already contained an hotel, a butcher's shop, and three stores, one of which was William Jack's. The tin fields around Herberton and the other towns which sprang up in the district in the early 1880s, proved to be the richest discovered on the Australian mainland.

At an early date, Jack sold his share in the Great Northern to merchant and mining entrepreneur John Moffatt, and set up Herberton's first store, in a small bark hut. Jack probably did not erect the more substantial premises of pit-sawn cedar chamfers until after he purchased the store site in October 1881.

John Newell joined William Jack as managing partner in Jack & Newell, General Merchants and Forwarding and Shipping Agents, in 1882, and in 1885 married Jack's daughter, Janet. As new mineral fields were discovered, Jack & Newell subsequently established a chain of 26 stores on the Atherton Tableland, and were frequently the financial mainstay of these early settlements. The company had its own form of paper currency, recognised by all banks and firms throughout North Queensland, and by the late 1890s was the largest merchant house north of Townsville. William Jack died in 1910, but the business name of Jack & Newell was retained.

John Newell maintained a lifelong association with mining interests in North Queensland, and was an active participant in civic affairs. He became a justice of the peace in 1884, was a member of the Herberton and Tinaroo Shire Councils, and served as mayor of Herberton in 1888–89. From 1896 until 1902 he was the Member of the Queensland Legislative Assembly for Woothakata; from its inception in 1906 until 1921, he was a member of the Cairns Harbour Board; and was vice-president of the short-lived Cairns Stock Exchange of 1906–12. Newell died in 1932, but several stores in the Jack & Newell chain survived into the 1970s. The store at Herberton remained the firm's headquarters until about 1960, and finally closed in late 1977.

== Description ==
This single-storeyed set of two shops is located on the corner of Grace and William Streets at the top of a rise on a northwesterly sloping site in Herberton. The building has corrugated iron, twin gable roofs with an awning to both street frontages supported by timber posts.

This single-skin timber building is clad in deep, pit-sawn chamferboard and features timber pilasters to the Grace Street shop fronts. Both shops have central entrances and a recent shop has been built on the lower side of the building to the northwest boundary. This shop has a timber gable parapet and a street awning to mimic the original shops.

An early petrol bowser is located on the William Street frontage. A single-storey fibrous cement shed is located to the rear of the building along with a grassed car parking area.

Internally, the corner shop has early shelving, exposed timber trusses and long timber counters with swivel stools fixed to the floor. The second shop is a bakery, and has been lined with hardboard. The building has been refurbished recently and original signage has been painted over.

== Heritage listing ==
The former Jack & Newell General Store was listed on the Queensland Heritage Register on 22 April 1993 having satisfied the following criteria.

The place is important in demonstrating the evolution or pattern of Queensland's history.

The former Jack & Newell General Store at Herberton is important in demonstrating the evolution and pattern of development of North Queensland history, being associated with the establishment and growth of Herberton and the surrounding tin fields in the late 19th century. It is significant historically also as the first store established in the chain of general stores founded by Jack & Newell throughout the Atherton Tableland and associated districts in the late 19th century.

The place demonstrates rare, uncommon or endangered aspects of Queensland's cultural heritage.

It is a rare, early 1880s rural general store in north Queensland retaining original pit-sawn cedar chamfers; and the interior offers rare illustration of a highly intact 19th century drapery store with early shelving, counter and seating.

The place is important in demonstrating the principal characteristics of a particular class of cultural places.

It is a rare, early 1880s rural general store in north Queensland retaining original pit-sawn cedar chamfers; and the interior offers rare illustration of a highly intact 19th century drapery store with early shelving, counter and seating.

The place is important because of its aesthetic significance.

The place exhibits a range of aesthetic characteristics valued by the Herberton community, including the contribution of the building's scale, form and materials, together with the adjacent petrol bowser, to the streetscape of Grace Street and to the Herberton townscape; and the interior with exposed roof framing, timber joinery and shop fittings.

The place has a strong or special association with a particular community or cultural group for social, cultural or spiritual reasons.

It has a special association for the local community as one of the earliest buildings in Herberton.

The place has a special association with the life or work of a particular person, group or organisation of importance in Queensland's history.

The place has a strong association with William Jack and John Newell and their substantial contribution to the foundation of Herberton and the Herberton tin mining industry, and to the development of commerce on the Atherton Tableland in the late 19th century.
