= Great Northern Mine =

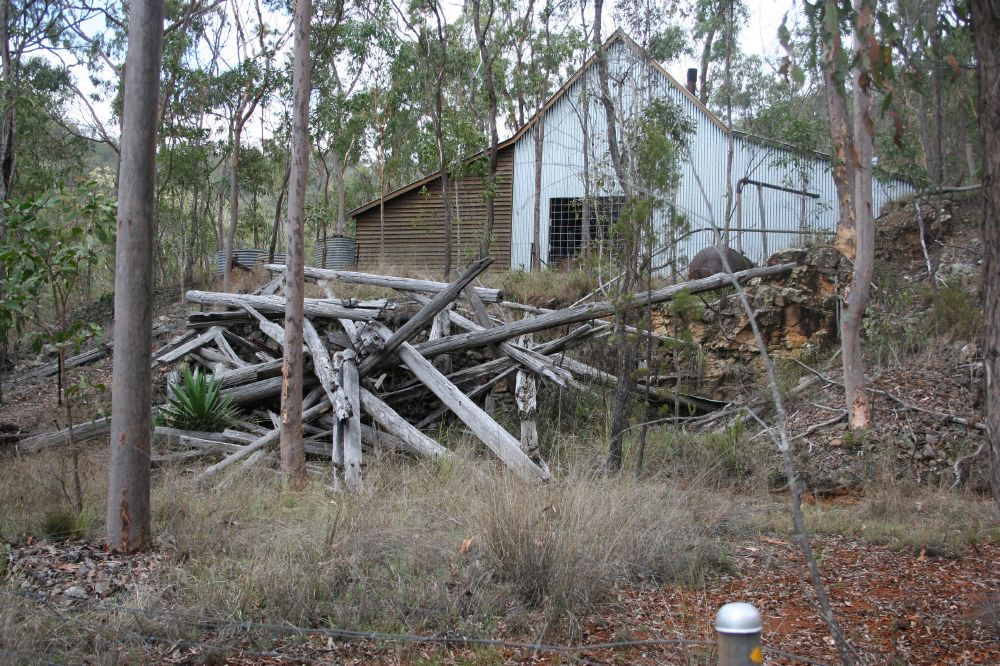
- Great Northern Mine, 2011

- Location within Queensland Location within Australia
- 17.3837°S 145.3901°E
- Location: Off Jacks Road, Herberton, Tablelands Region, Queensland, Australia

History
- Design period: 1870s–1890s (late 19th century)
- Built: 1880–1940s

Queensland Heritage Register
- Official name: Great Northern Mine (Herberton)
- Type: state heritage (archaeological, built)
- Designated: 21 October 1992
- Reference no.: 600542
- Significant period: 1880s–1940s (fabric); 1880–1893, 1902–1940s (historical)
- Significant components: mine – open cut, wall/s – retaining, shed/s, machinery/plant/equipment – mining/mineral processing, adit, headframe, objects (movable) – mining/mineral processing, residential accommodation – housing, shaft, alluvial workings, mullock heap

Great Northern Mine is a heritage-listed mine off Jacks Road, Herberton, Tablelands Region, Queensland, Australia. It was built from 1880 to 1940s. It was added to the Queensland Heritage Register on 21 October 1992.

== History ==
The Great Northern tin lode was discovered in 1879 and four prospectors, William Jack, William Ronald Joss, John Newell and Thomas Brandon, who had been working in the Tinaroo and Wild River area for some time applied on 12 April 1880 at Thornborough for a sixty-acre Mineral Freehold.

The Great Northern lode was on the eastern side of the Wild River and they traced the three feet wide lode for two miles up the ridges. They located two to three hundred weights of rich tin and, local legend has it, they smelted it crudely on site in a tree stump using their felt hats as bellows. Jack and Newell communicated their find to John Moffat in Stanthorpe who agreed to invest in a battery and smelter in the newly named Herberton area. By August 1880 there were 70 miners at work at Herberton.

On 18 September 1880 the Great Northern mine was christened. John Moffat, Anthony Linedale and George Seaman from Stanthorpe and Tent Hill arrived in Herberton in mid October 1880. Moffat's milling experience enabled him to secure leases and determine the location of tin batteries. Local miners hailed his technical knowledge as necessary for the development of the field.

Moffat's men prepared foundations for their Great Northern battery in November 1880. After Samuel Denny's experiments at tin lting on behalf of other miners failed, Moffat enlisted his support for the Great Northern venture. Moffat's machinery arrived in Herberton in February 1881. The Great Northern ten head stamp battery had a trial crushing in early May 1881. Moffat formed the Herberton Tin Company to manage the Great Northern battery and all his mining interests including the Great Northern mine, on behalf of his Glen Smelting Company in Tent Hill, New South Wales.

In the 1800s the Great Northern yielded a steady income for the Moffat's Glen Smelting Company. Up to 1885 the mine averaged a phenomenal 30%. Moffat's manager, William Bonar, who had previously worked on the Palmer Goldfield, was able to accurately assess the direction of the lode and patterns and distributions to determine where it might next appear as benches and steps in the shaft, a contrasting policy to the reckless devastation of many lodes on Herberton hill. Bonar worked on two lodes the Gully and the Eastern. The two shafts were timbered in 1885 and an "Eclipse" rock drilling plant was acquired in 1887. The assays dropped in 1885 but at 8.6% the Great Northern was still very profitable.

Moffat sought to sell the Great Northern mine and battery several times during the late 1880s and early 1890s. The manager, Bonar, and Herberton storekeeper and mining investor, John Newell, were opposed to southern management taking over. When the finances of the Glen Smelting Company were rationalised into the Irvinebank Mining Company (private) in 1889–90 the Herberton Tin Company was not sold into any public company. Moffat tried again in 1892 to sell the Great Northern mine and mill to Sydney interests but without success. The mine closed down in 1893, except for some work done by tributers.

Herberton and the Great Northern had suffered from three serious problems in its development: reckless opening of many lodes in the early years, the difficulty in gaining exemptions to install machinery, and the expectation that the Great Northern would continue to perform as a bonanza. There were also problems right up to World War I that there was theft of rich ore and tampering with assays.

The Great Northern contributed significantly to John Moffat's companies for decades. Over 30 years it produced 4,400 long tons (4,500 t) of tin valued at £220,000 at an average assay of 14%. The mill ceased for a time in 1895. Moffat succeeded in floating the Great Northern in 1901 but the mill and mine remained idle until 1902. The shaft was sunk to 213 metres (699 ft) in the next four years. The following years of operation the assay was only 3.5% and the mill was spectacularly less successful than the first fifteen years. Controversy arose over management of the three shafts, Froghole, Gully and Great Northern. Heavy water also entered the Gully shaft. Further sinking was postponed pending the erection of a headframe in 1909. However the mill, technologically more modern than the Loudoun at Irvinebank and christened on 24 August 1904, was a boon for miners. Nevertheless, the problem over assays and theft continued.

The brace was erected in 1909 on the New Gully shaft. The mine resumed in the middle of 1916 with dewatering to 91 metres (299 ft). The winding plant was reset on foundations and the machinery overhauled. Seventeen men were employed in 1917 mining in the No.2 and No.3 workings. 30.5 long tons (31.0 t) of tin ore were obtained for a return of five tons 13 cwt of tin valued at £1,016. The company's mill was expected to be commissioned in 1918. The Gully shaft was cleaned out in 1918 down to a rich body of ore at 12 metres (39 ft). The company was able to clear off its debt. The town battery started crushing in February 1918. That year it was the second highest producer on the field.

In 1928 encouraging results were obtained from the hitherto barren side of a porphry dyke at the 122-metre (400 ft) level. In 1930 the company lost the services of S. Day its manager since its re-opening in 1917. £7,658 worth of tin averaging 11.1% was won from 767 long tons (779 t) of ore. Freehold title was regained over the mine. Because of the low price of tin operations were suspended at the end of the year.

In 1937 the north workings were prospected and broken stopes retimbered; 29 long tons (29 t) of wolfram and 81 long tons (82 t) of tin were obtained. In the spa lode behind the boiler shed a winze and shaft were sunk for 10 long tons (10 t) of good ore in 1938. A new shaft to 15 metres (49 ft) on the eastern lode in 1940 and prospecting shafts were put in; 215 long tons (218 t) of old dumps were treated for 2.6 long tons (2.6 t) of concentrates.

In 1945 several tons of dumps were treated averaging under 1% for metal but no underground mining was done. No underground work was done in 1947 but some surface prospecting was carried out. In 1940 J. Newell dewatered "A" shaft. The Great Northern Freehold Mine and the battery changed hands in 1953. The new owner, F. L. Stamp, commenced work on the mine in June and put down six prospecting holes to obtain new lodes. The mine rarely operated thereafter.

== Description ==
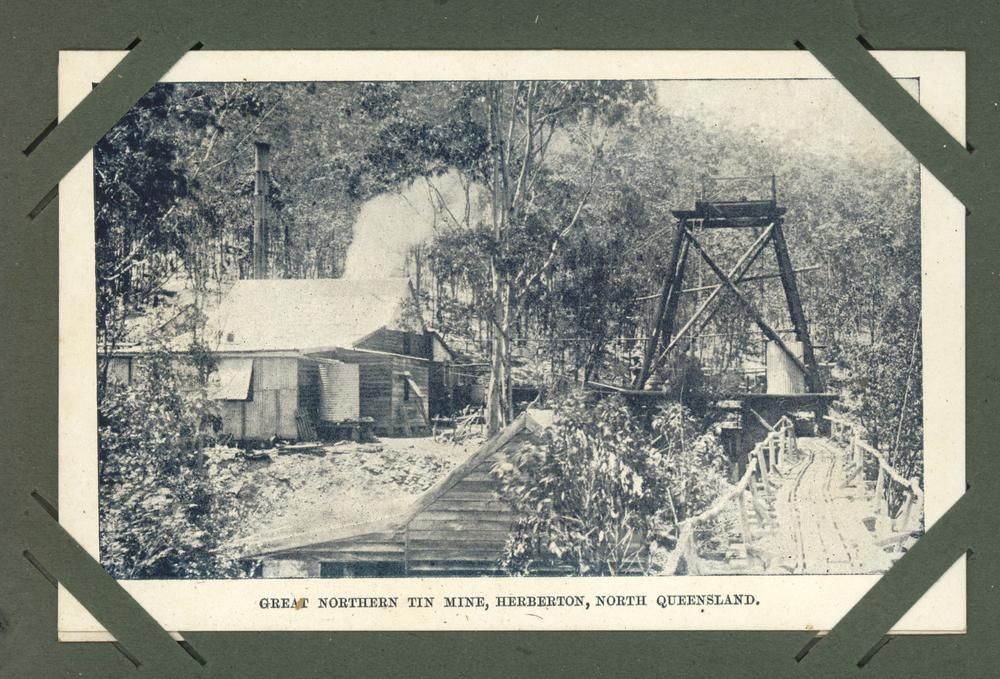
Great Northern Tin Mine, circa 1907

The place contains a comprehensive range of functions that exemplify historical tin mining in the Herberton district including - alluvial workings, shaft sinking, winding and pumping, maintenance and accommodation. There are four main component areas - alluvial workings, Eastern Shaft, Gully Shaft and a house.

Alluvial workings extend for the length of a permanent watercourse which runs through on the boundary of the property. These workings include stone and concrete retaining walls and evidence of work areas and camp sites. This area is claimed to be "the gully in which alluvial tin was first discovered".

The property contains 16 mine shafts of varying depths, an adit and an open cut shaft. The most important of these workings are the Eastern Shaft and the Gully shaft with their associated surface structures and plant. The Eastern Shaft group is extremely intact and includes a timber collared shaft and timber headframe, with an intact round timber and weatherboard winding shed containing an air receiver, compressor, single cylinder and portable steam engines, winding engine, boiler and pump. An extensive mullock dump is associated with the shaft.

The Gully Shaft, which is centrally situated on the property, contains a main shaft with a caved collar and recently collapsed timber headframe. Associated buildings includes a workshop and smithy (now collapsed), a crib room, and a round timber and weatherboard winding shed containing two vertical boilers converted to air receivers, a compressor, a winding engine and two boilers. This machinery is claimed to be from the Durham mine on the Etheridge Goldfield.

The fourth component of the place is an early two room house of weatherboard timber and iron construction set on round timber stumps. Furnishings, furniture and bric-a-brac of the former owner, remain. The house is termite infested and in poor condition.

The surviving plant includes:

- Colonial boiler - Smith & Faulkner Brisbane
- Tandem air compressor - A.Harkness & Co. Victoria Foundry Bendigo 1891
- Tandem air compressor - J.Horwood & Sons Bendigo Ironworks Sandhurst Estab 1856
- Portable steam engine - Marshall & Sons & Co. No 4904 Gainsborough England, David Munro & Co.Melbourne Distributors
- Vertical Special steam pump - Tangye Makers Birmingham
- Colonial boiler in brick mount - Walkers Limited
- Colonial boiler - no brand
- Two-cylinder winding engine - Walkers Ltd Engineers Maryborough
- Two-cylinder winding engine - no brand. (Walkers Limited)
- 2 Vertical boilers (Air receivers)
- Duplex steam pump (not in situ)
- Tandem air compressor - Ingersoll Rand.

== Heritage listing ==
Great Northern Mine was listed on the Queensland Heritage Register on 21 October 1992 having satisfied the following criteria.

The place is important in demonstrating the evolution or pattern of Queensland's history.

The Great Northern mine at Herberton is historically significant as the pioneer lode tin producer in Australia (compared with alluvial production). Discoveries of tin in 1879 led to the establishment of an active and thriving township to be named, Herberton. Within four years there were 160 other lode or reef tin mines being worked in the neighbourhood. Hence, the Great Northern had a key role in stimulating the development of the mining industry and the economy of the Atherton Tableland.

The place demonstrates rare, uncommon or endangered aspects of Queensland's cultural heritage.

The mine contains the only timber headframe with sheave wheels surviving in North Queensland. The rarity and intactness of the surviving plant surpasses any other mining place recorded in Queensland. The rare plant includes a Harkness compressor (possibly the only Harkness product surviving in Australia), a Horwood compressor (the only known intact item) and a very early and rare 1878 Marshall portable steam engine in good condition. It is rare that two tandem steam air compressors manufactured by two of Victoria's earliest engine builders (A. Harkness, Victoria Foundry, Bendigo and J. Horwood, Bendigo Ironworks) still reside together on an early North Queensland mine. The combination of components - alluvial mining, hard rock mining and residence on a freehold property - is rare.

The place has a special association with the life or work of a particular person, group or organisation of importance in Queensland's history.

The mine is also associated with the mining entrepreneur, John Moffat, as his first venture in North Queensland in 1880.
