= Herberton School of Arts =

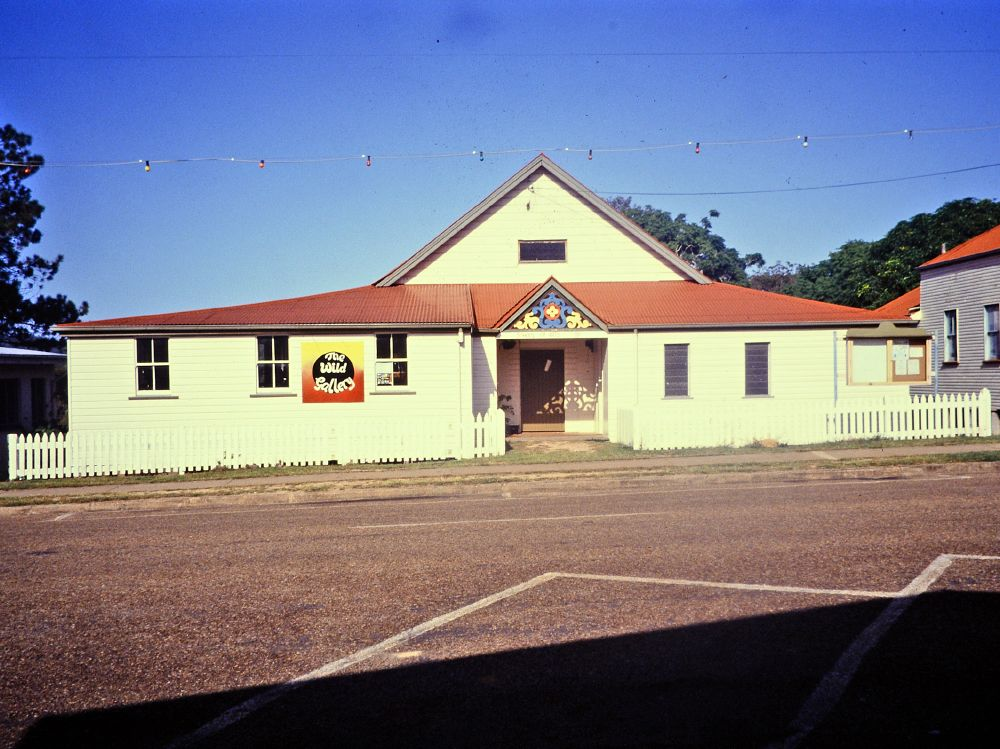
- Herberton School of Arts, 1992

- Location within Queensland Location within Australia
- 17.3843°S 145.3856°E
- Location: 61 Grace Street, Herberton, Tablelands Region, Queensland, Australia

History
- Design period: 1870s–1890s (late 19th century)
- Built: 1881

Site notes
- Architectural style: Classicism

Queensland Heritage Register
- Official name: Herberton School of Arts
- Type: state heritage (built)
- Designated: 21 October 1992
- Reference no.: 600540
- Significant period: 1880s–1900s (fabric); 1880s (historical); 1880s–1930s (social)
- Significant components: school of arts, library – building

Herberton School of Arts is a heritage-listed school of arts at 61 Grace Street, Herberton, Tablelands Region, Queensland, Australia. It was built in 1881. It was added to the Queensland Heritage Register on 21 October 1992.

== History ==
The School of Arts at Herberton was constructed in 1881 as a community endeavour during the earliest European settlement of the district and is still a community resource.

Herberton was founded following the discovery, in 1880, of a substantial reef of tin in the vicinity. A rush followed almost immediately, and by August, when Warden Mowbray laid out the town of Herberton (so named because of its proximity to the Wild River, the head of the Herbert River), it already contained a hotel, a butcher's shop, and three stores. The tin fields around Herberton and the other towns which sprang up in the district in the early 1880s, proved to be the richest discovered on the Australian mainland.

On 31 December 1880 an open-air public meeting was held for the purpose of founding a School of Arts in Herberton. Strong public support was demonstrated by donations of £50 for the purpose. A site was purchased for £18 in early January the next year. By the end of the month a bark structure had been erected. It was the first community building in the district and the establishment of a School of Arts so early in the settlement of the area was unusual.

The first Mechanics' Institutes or Schools of Arts were established in Britain in the early 1800s and were intended to assist self-improvement and to promote moral, social and intellectual growth by providing lectures, discussions and lending libraries to a rising middle class. At the time there were no public libraries and books were expensive, so access to them by borrowing as subscribers provided an important educational and recreational service. The first School of Arts committee in Queensland was established in Brisbane in 1849 aiming for "the advancement of the community in literary, philosophic and scientific subjects". As towns and districts became established, local committees were formed to establish Schools of Arts and they became one of the principal means of adult education.

By 22 October 1881 The Queenslander reported that a public hall had been built in Herberton. It opened with a ball on 9 November 1881. On 16 November that year it was the venue for the first local government meeting on the Tablelands and within a month was also in use as a school. Indeed, the demand for the venue for meetings, lectures and theatre was so high that by December, bookings for the first months of the new year had been made to the sum of £250.

By 1882 Herberton was connected to Port Douglas by a coach service. It boomed in the 1880s and 1890s, its population reaching its highest level of 1,500 in 1895 before it began to decline as the nearby town of Irvinebank developed in the late 1890s. In 1895 the rear of the School of Arts was extended to provide a stage and two small dressing rooms.

It was intended that the development of towns on the Tablelands should be encouraged by connecting them to the coast by rail, however, the terrain was difficult and the Tablelands railway line came very slowly over the range from Cairns between 1886 and 1910. A photograph taken in this year, to celebrate the arrival of the railway, shows two small rooms at the front of the hall, possibly created by enclosing verandahs.

In 1934 one of these rooms was extended for use as offices for the Herberton Shire Council while its offices were constructed elsewhere. By the 1960s the building was in poor condition though still being used for meetings and social functions. A series of grants and community projects provided funds for renovation and repair until the Shire Council took over responsibility for the building in 1986. Since 1992 it has housed the Herberton Public Library in its core and there have been a geological collection and a photographic display in its front rooms, thus continuing the educational aspects of its service to the community. In 1992 a suspended coved ceiling was installed in the hall, under the main gable.

The building was enclosed underneath with timber battening in 1995. Alterations have been made to the front facade with the addition of various gardens, paving and the erection of a pergola on the northern side (both complete by 1995). The pergola had been sheeted with corrugated metal by 2001.

== Description ==
The School of Arts is located in the central business area of Herberton on a site that falls away from the street towards the rear property boundary (101/SP124675). It comprises a reserve, 747 sqm in size and a small road leading off Grace Street, which is about 253 sqm. The building sits at the street end of the site, diagonally opposite the two-storey timber Royal Hotel. To the north, at the intersection with William Street stands the former Jack & Newell General Store.

The School of Arts is a single-storeyed timber-framed building with weatherboard cladding and set on timber and some steel posts. The undercroft, which increases in height as the land falls away, is enclosed with timber battening. Two concrete block rooms (toilets) have been inserted under the building at its rear. The roof is clad with corrugated metal sheeting and comprises a main gable running perpendicular to the street, broken-backed skillions over two rooms on each of the rear gable ends and low-pitched, hipped additions facing the street on either side of a central gabled porch. This is filled with a triangular panel of painted timber fretwork and beyond which is the entry door to the library. On either side of the door are a number of windows. A modern timber pergola has been inserted in front of the northern section of this building face along with some paving and garden beds (all by 1995, pergola sheeted by 2001).

The interior comprises a large hall, now used as a library, with a stage area at the rear flanked by small dressing rooms, and two L-shaped rooms on either side of the street entrance. The hall has a suspended coved ceiling of acoustic board exposing the bottom chords of the timber trusses. The walls of the stage area are unlined, while those toward the street are lined with wide vertical boarding. The windows of the hall on both its side walls have timber board shutters hinged from the top. The small rooms on either side of the stage are entirely unlined and each has a small boarded-up window and ledged-and-braced door.

The rooms at the front of the building house an exhibition space and a small geological museum. The ceilings are lined with stained timber boarding, while some walls are single-skin with horizontal boarding and some are weatherboards.

== Heritage listing ==
Herberton School of Arts was listed on the Queensland Heritage Register on 21 October 1992 having satisfied the following criteria.

The place is important in demonstrating the evolution or pattern of Queensland's history.

The School of Arts is important in illustrating the development of Herberton and as an element in the network of these institutions which sprang up in any town of consequence in Queensland during the 19th and early 20th centuries. They were community based and played a valuable educational and social role in the dissemination of information and the provision of facilities for lectures, meetings, games of skill and the staging of community events such as plays and concerts.

The place is important because of its aesthetic significance.

The School of Arts is on a site central to the business area and makes an important visual contribution to the built character of Herberton.

The place has a strong or special association with a particular community or cultural group for social, cultural or spiritual reasons.

The School of Arts is important for its connection with the community of Herberton as an integral part of the social and community life of the town since its inception.
