= Barrier Reef Hotel =

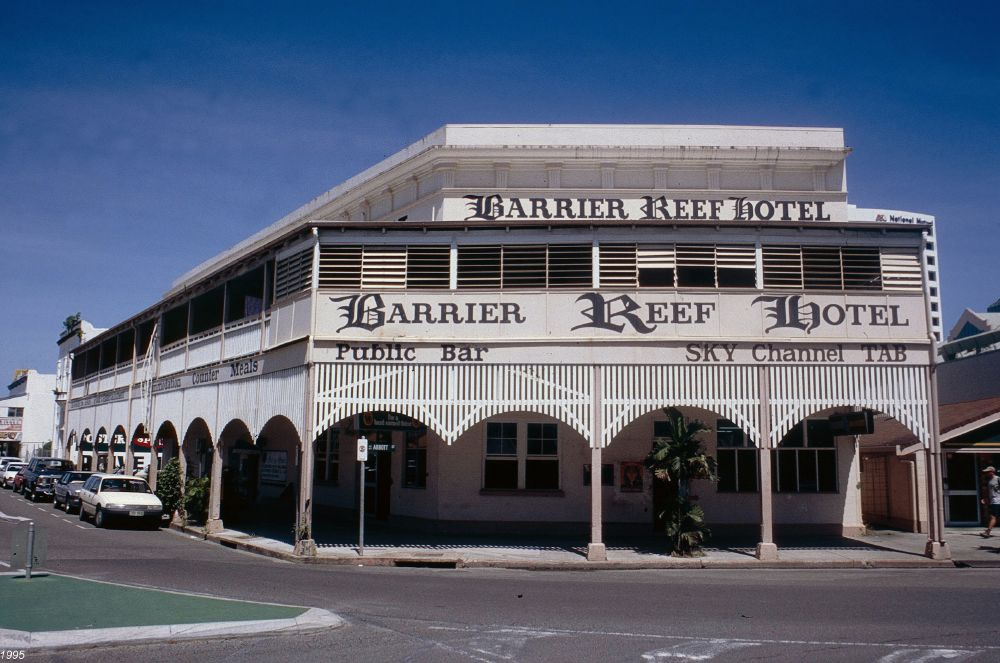
- Barrier Reef Hotel, 1995

- Location within Queensland Location within Australia
- 16.9249°S 145.7795°E
- Location: Abbott Street, Cairns City, Cairns, Cairns Region, Queensland, Australia

History
- Design period: 1919–1930s (interwar period)
- Built: 1926

Site notes
- Architect: Lawrence and Lordan in conjunction with Richard Hall

Queensland Heritage Register
- Official name: Barrier Reef Hotel, Empire Hotel
- Type: state heritage (built)
- Designated: 29 July 1997
- Reference no.: 601608
- Significant period: 1920s (fabric); 1926–ongoing (historical use)
- Builders: Carl Peter Jorgensen

Barrier Reef Hotel is a heritage-listed hotel at Abbott Street, Cairns City, Cairns, Cairns Region, Queensland, Australia. It was designed by Lawrence and Lordan in conjunction with Richard Hill built in 1926 by Carl Peter Jorgensen. It was also known as Empire Hotel. It was added to the Queensland Heritage Register on 29 July 1997.

== History ==
The Barrier Reef (formerly Empire) Hotel, a two-storeyed reinforced concrete building, was erected in 1926 for PJ Doyle Ltd, wine and spirit merchants of Cairns and Thursday Island. The architects were Lawrence and Lordan in conjunction with Richard Hill, both Cairns-based firms. The building replaced an earlier Empire Hotel on the site, opened in 1898.

The Barrier Reef Hotel is situated at the corner of Abbott and Wharf Streets on what was formerly Section II of the 1876 Cairns Town Plan - the survey point from which the town of Cairns was laid out was fixed at this corner just 0.5 metres (1 ft 8 in) from the present building. On the opposite side of Abbott Street the Government Reserve was established. Close to the earliest wharves, this end of Abbott Street developed during the last quarter of the 19th century as the principal business and administrative district of Cairns, composed principally of government offices, warehouses, shipping agents' offices and hotels. The latter catered for local office and wharf workers, as well as for travellers arriving by the coastal steamers. Little of this district's 19th century structures survive, the area being largely re-built in the first four decades of the 20th century as wharf facilities expanded to cater for the emergence of Cairns as a major sugar port. And of the buildings extant in this district by the late 1930s - Burns Philp Building, Joseph Pease Building, Jack and Newell Building, Consolidated Fertilizers Building and a string of working- class hotels: the Australian, Criterion, Mining Exchange, Oceanic, Royal and Empire (later the Barrier Reef) - only the Barrier Reef Hotel and the former Jack and Newell Building remain to perpetuate the association of this part of the city with its waterfront origins.

Patrick J Doyle, for whom the second Empire Hotel was built, had established business as an accountant, commission agent and general agent at Thursday Island in 1889, and was clerk of the Torres Divisional Board from at least 1890 until c. 1899. By 1894, Doyle had entered into wine and spirit wholesaling, moving his main office to Cairns c. 1899, and maintaining a branch office at Thursday Island. About 1921 he formed a limited liability company, and in the same year acquired title to the first Empire Hotel site and to the land between the hotel and the corner of Wharf and Abbot Streets. PJ Doyle Ltd appears to have been successful, with new Cairns offices and bulk store being constructed for the firm, 1925–26.

PJ Doyle Ltd's construction in 1926 of the second, more substantial Empire Hotel reflected local confidence in the growth of Cairns as an important regional centre. Revenue generated through the Port of Cairns had risen from £12,000 in 1906 to £55,456 in 1926, outstripping both Townsville and Rockhampton. In the mid-1920s the Cairns Harbour Board announced plans to erect additional wharf facilities - a new reinforced concrete wharf, 400 feet (120 m) long, with rail approach and large shed - which was constructed 1928–29. With its status as the principal port of Far North Queensland being consolidated during the interwar period, Cairns underwent rapid development, and the city centre was largely re-built.

In April 1925 the Cairns licensing court condemned the first Empire Hotel building, refusing to renew the license unless the place was demolished and replaced with a brick or concrete structure by 30 September 1925. PJ Doyle Ltd could well have erected offices or warehouses instead, but the company chose to retain the hotel business, indicating their confidence in the ability of the wharf district to support yet another expensive new hotel. Their decision to invest in building a new Empire Hotel appears to have been linked with the development of Cairns at this period.

Work on the new Empire (to cost £10,000) had started by April 1926, the contractor being Carl Peter Jorgensen of Cairns. The building was well underway by September that year, and the hotel was open for business by February 1927. The ground floor contained a public bar, dining room, kitchen and one shop fronting Abbott Street; the first floor was taken up with bedrooms and bathrooms. It was a plain and modest hotel, catering mainly for business and working people. During the 1930s the hotel was used extensively by the travelling public, averaging 105 guests per week in 1936. During the Second World War the Royal Australian Air Force occupied part of the hotel, from early 1943 until mid-1945.

In late 1938 the Empire Hotel site was transferred to Northern Australian Breweries Ltd, who held the title until 1960. PJ Doyle Wines & Spirits Pty Ltd maintained a close connection with the Empire after 1938, firstly as a mortgagor, and from 1 December 1959 until c. 1977 as the lessee. A variety of sub-lessees, (often the owners of the property), operated the hotel during this latter period.

Both the first and second Empire hotels maintained a strong association with the workers on the wharves across the road. Reputedly, during the 1950s, when Cairns' sugar handlers were working round-the-clock in three eight hour shifts, the Empire Hotel remained open 24 hours a day. The name was changed to the Barrier Reef Hotel in May 1960, possibly reflecting the burgeoning prawning and fishing industry based in Cairns from the late 1950s. During the 1960s and early 1970s the hotel fell into disrepair, with the license suspended briefly in 1974. Since the mid-1970s the hotel and adjacent sites, including the former Jack & Newell Building, have been amalgamated as a re-development site. The building still functions as a hotel.

== Description ==
The Barrier Reef Hotel is situated on the corner of Wharf and Abbott Streets, Cairns. The floor plan of the building responds to the trapezoidal shape of the site where the grid layout of the city meets Trinity Inlet. The building is constructed in reinforced concrete, with timber floors and corrugated iron roofing. Windows and doors are of timber.

The building is two-storeyed with a wide verandah attached to parapet walls running along Wharf and Abbott Streets. The verandah is supported on heavy timber posts evenly spaced with the posts each side of the corner at the street intersection missing, which is an original feature. The verandah has a plain slatted balustrade at first floor level and below this a later skirt with segmental profile of slatted boards between the supporting posts. The verandah has been enclosed at first floor level along Abbott Street.

The parapet wall is finished at the top with a heavy cornice with wide dentil course supported on fluted pilasters beneath. The rear elevations are without decoration and run as a parapet wall along the west elevation and slope back from the Abbott Street elevation forming a parapet to a skillion roof. The skillion roof runs back from the west, Wharf and Abbott Street elevations. The north and west walls are punctuated by evenly spaced windows of double hung proportion indicating the position of single rooms at ground and first floor levels. Some of the windows have been replaced with louvres. The fenestration at ground floor level along Wharf and Abbott Streets appears to be original except the main entry door at Wharf Street, which has been replaced with an aluminium framed door. The northwestern rear sections of the hotel appear to represent a conglomeration of a number of periods of alterations.

Typically the interior of the ground floor has been altered to suit changing retail hotel requirements. It is now divided into restaurant kitchen, restaurant, public bar and ablution facilities.

The main stair to the first floor has simple detailing reflecting its interwar period of construction and remains in its original position. The first floor has retained its original configuration being divided into a series of single rooms off narrow corridors which run parallel to the west and north elevations. The detailing is plain with battened ceilings.

The building is a strong contributor to the streetscape along both Abbott and Wharf Streets.

A single-storeyed gable roofed building of contemporary design runs down the northwest side of the hotel and serves as a TAB. It is not considered to be of heritage significance.

== Heritage listing ==
Barrier Reef Hotel was listed on the Queensland Heritage Register on 29 July 1997 having satisfied the following criteria.

The place is important in demonstrating the evolution or pattern of Queensland's history.

The Barrier Reef Hotel survives as an important illustration of the growth and rebuilding of Cairns in the interwar years, when Cairns was transformed from a late 19th-century backwater into a progressive, 20th-century city. The building is important also as an illustration of the emphasis placed by Cairns architects and builders of the interwar period on reinforced concrete as a suitable building material for a tropical, cyclone-prone environment.

The place demonstrates rare, uncommon or endangered aspects of Queensland's cultural heritage.

It is one of only two surviving buildings which illustrate the early-established and important connection between the businesses in the Wharf-Abbott-Lake Street area and the adjacent wharves, and remains a good example of a substantial, inter-war Cairns hotel which catered principally for local workers.

The place is important in demonstrating the principal characteristics of a particular class of cultural places.

It is one of only two surviving buildings which illustrate the early-established and important connection between the businesses in the Wharf-Abbott-Lake Street area and the adjacent wharves, and remains a good example of a substantial, inter-war Cairns hotel which catered principally for local workers.

The place is important because of its aesthetic significance.

The building makes a strong contribution to the streetscape along both Abbott and Wharf Streets.

The place has a strong or special association with a particular community or cultural group for social, cultural or spiritual reasons.

The Barrier Reef Hotel has a strong association for the Cairns community with the development of an early, vibrant commercial district based on wharf activities, and of Cairns as an important Queensland port.
