= William Little (politician) =

Australian politician

Member of the Queensland Legislative Assembly for Woothakata
- In office 19 May 1888 – 20 May 1893
- Preceded by: New seat
- Succeeded by: William Rawlings

Personal details
- Born: William Clancy Little; 1840 Liverpool, New South Wales, Australia
- Died: 18 June 1902 (aged 61-62) Sydney, New South Wales, Australia
- Spouse: Ellen Adams (m.1879)
- Occupation: Miner

William Clancy Little (1840 – 18 June 1902) was a politician in Queensland, Australia. He was a Member of the Queensland Legislative Assembly.

Parliament of Queensland
New seat	Member for Woothakata; 1888–1893	Succeeded by William Rawlings
