= Jack and Newell Building =

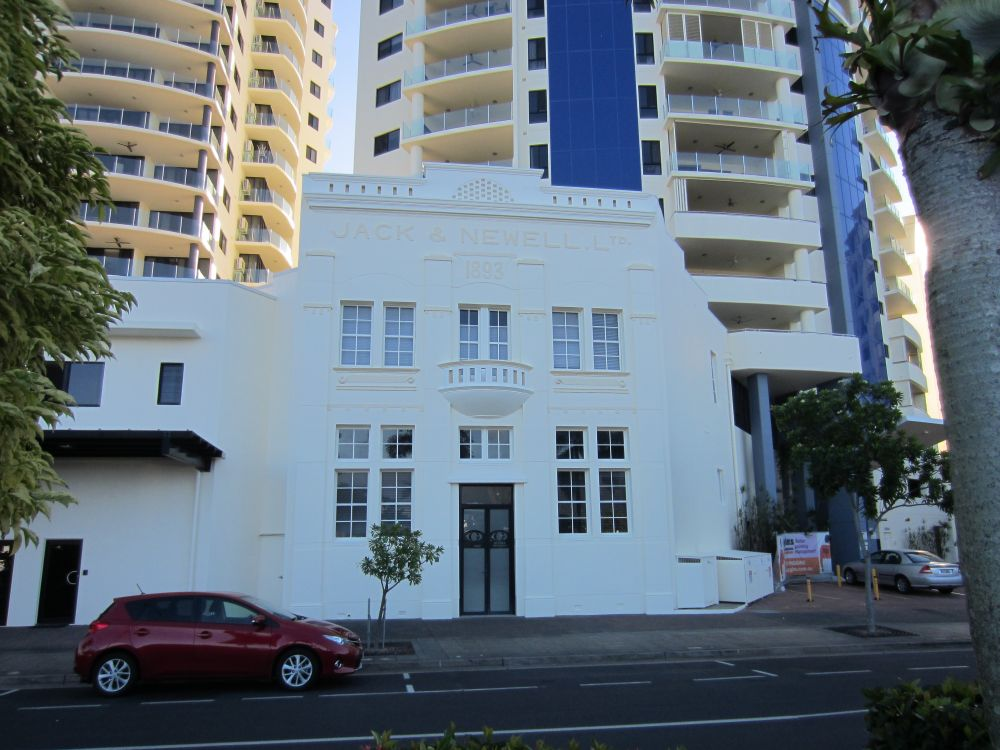
- Jack and Newell Building, 2015

- Location within Queensland Location within Australia
- 16.9252°S 145.7793°E
- Location: 29 Wharf Street, Cairns City, Cairns, Cairns Region, Queensland, Australia

History
- Design period: 1900–1914 (early 20th century)
- Built: 1911

Queensland Heritage Register
- Official name: Jack and Newell Building (former), Bartlam's Ltd, Fearnley & Co. Ltd, Nosworthy's Stores
- Type: state heritage (built)
- Designated: 22 November 1996
- Reference no.: 601610
- Significant period: 1900s (fabric); 1911–1980s (historical commercial use)
- Significant components: showroom, office/s, strong room, warehouse
- Builders: Hanson & Sons

Jack and Newell Building is a heritage-listed office building at 29 Wharf Street, Cairns City, Cairns, Cairns Region, Queensland, Australia. It was built in 1911 by Hanson & Sons. It is also known as Bartlam's Ltd, Fearnley & Co. Ltd, and Nosworthy's Stores. It was added to the Queensland Heritage Register on 22 November 1996.

== History ==
The former Jack & Newell Building appears to have been erected in 1911 as new premises for Fearnley & Co. Ltd, shipping and commission agents, on land held in the name of the company's managing director, Dr John Hastings Reed of Cairns.

John Gillett Fearnley had arrived in Cairns c. 1888 as manager for commission and shipping agents Thomas & Maddon. In 1889 he went into partnership with WC Smith (previously manager of the Queensland National Bank in Cairns), as Smith & Fearnley, storekeepers, merchants, and commercial, forwarding, shipping and insurance agents, Cairns. In 1893 (the year which appears on the front of the present building) the partnership was dissolved, and JG Fearnley, commission, forwarding and shipping agent was established.

About 1895 Fearnley secured the Adelaide Steamship Company's new Cairns agency. Initially he rented wharf facilities, but c. 1898 erected a substantial new wharf and offices past the terminus of Wharf Street at Lake Street, on Special Lease No.546. By 1905, JG Fearnley was one of the four principal wharf owners in Cairns, the others being Burns, Philp & Co., Walsh & Co., and Howard Smith Co. Ltd. He was a justice of the peace and a prominent member of the community, having served for many years on the local council and on a variety of local community committees. A street in Cairns is named in his honour.

The firm of JG Fearnley was re-structured in 1905–1906. In May 1905 Fearnley relinquished the agency for the Adelaide Steamship Company, selling his wharf, sheds and associated offices to the Company, but retaining his shipping, forwarding and general agency business. By August 1905 new offices (not the present building) were being erected for his firm near the Adelaide Steamship Company's offices and close to his former wharf. In October the same year Fearnley announced his intention of moving his family to the south, and left his business under the management of accountant Lionel Draper of Cairns from 9 December 1905. In January 1906, he entered into an agreement with a group of Brisbane businessmen to convert his firm into a limited liability company, Fearnley & Co. Ltd, with Fearnley remaining the managing director of the company for life, but with power to delegate that function. The new company was registered in July 1906 with Dr John Hastings Reed, manager of the Hambledon Sugar Mills outside Cairns, delegated Managing Director.

Affecting the activities of Cairns shipping agencies and wharf owners at this time was the establishment of the Cairns Harbour Board, incorporated by Act of Parliament on 20 December 1905, and in operation from 1 January 1906. In 1906 the new Board announced that it had formed a scheme for the development of the harbour and intended to acquire and develop the existing wharves, which it did in 1907–1908. In 1907 the Harbour Board also moved the offices of the Adelaide Steamship Company further back from their former wharf. Similar action could well have been taken with other shipping agency offices, and may have provided the catalyst for Fearnley & Co. Ltd moving to new offices in Wharf Street, opposite the Harbour Board's No.2 wharf (formerly Walsh & Co.'s wharf), in December 1907. This equates very much with the location of the present building.

The 1907 move may well have been to the present site, but it is not clear whether to the present building. The site was alienated in 1876 as allotment 20 of Section 2, parish of Cairns, County of Nares. Whether any building was extant on the site prior to 1907 is not known. Title was transferred to John Hastings Reed in September 1907, at which time he also took out a mortgage of £1500 on the property. This may have enabled the construction of the present building. However, early in 1911 Cairns contractors Hanson and Sons were reported to have won the contract to erect new brick premises for Fearnley & Co. Ltd, time 4 months and price around £2,300. This is more likely to refer to the present building.

From late 1922 to early 1923, Fearnley & Co. Ltd was taken over by Bartlams Ltd, merchants, carriers, shipping and forwarding agents of Townsville and Charters Towers, and title to the site of the Fearnley & Co. Ltd Building was transferred to them in January 1926. By April 1931, Bartlams had relinquished business in Cairns, but retained title to the Wharf Street property. From 1 December 1930, Ralph Collins Nosworthy took out a five-year lease on part of the building from Bartlams, and the Queensland Post Office Directory records Nosworthy's Stores at 29 Wharf Street in 1934.

In 1939 the property was transferred to John Newell of the North Queensland firm of Jack & Newell, who had held title to the adjoining property (allotment 23 of section 2) since 1899. Jack & Newell had established as general storekeepers in Herberton in 1880, and by the turn of the century had stores at Herberton, Irvinebank, Montalbion, Muldiva, Mareeba, Cairns and Port Douglas and were operating as commission, forwarding and shipping agents as well. Their Cairns shipping and forwarding agency was established c. 1897, possibly in the single-storeyed building on allotment 23.

Jack & Newell's acquisition of the former Fearnley & Co. Ltd premises in the late 1930s continued the association of the building with the shipping and forwarding business. It seems that the building was rendered only after the sale to Jack & Newell, obliterating the names Fearnley & Co. Ltd and Bartlams Ltd on the front facade and replacing them with Jack & Newell & Co. The building and site remained the property of Jack & Newell Pty Ltd until acquired in the mid-1970s as part of the Barrier Reef Hotel re-development site. Through the second half of the 1970s and during the 1980s, the building was used as a wine and spirits bulk store associated with the nearby Barrier Reef Hotel.

In 2004, as part of a redevelopment of Wharf Street, most of the building was pulled down and only the facade and front office remain as part of the 14-storey Jack & Newell Holiday Apartments complex.

== Description ==
The former Jack and Newell Building is situated in Wharf Street, half-way along the block between Abbott and Lake Streets, and directly opposite the principal wharves of Cairns.

The plan form of the building is rectangular, with the Wharf Street boundary responding to the subdivision of land in this area where the grid pattern of the city meets Trinity Inlet at an angle. The building is constructed in brick and is two-storeyed where it faces Wharf Street and single-storeyed at the rear.

The elevation to Wharf Street is symmetrical about a ground floor entry door and first floor French doors that open onto a segmental balcony which has a simple slotted balustrade. Each side of these elements are pairs of timber double hung windows at ground and first floor level between capped pilasters. The whole of the facade has been rendered, covering the original brickwork which had rendered bands over the windows at each level, below the first floor windows and across the facade at the sill and head of the ground floor windows. The facade is finished at the top with a stepped parapet slotted at each side and with a semicircular decorative honeycomb brick element centrally positioned over a cornice that extends across the width of the building. Below this is the sign JACK & NEWELL & Co. in relief and below this, centrally located, the date 1893, also in relief.

The side walls step down from the Wharf Street elevation forming a parapet to the skillion roof over the upper storey. The rear wall to the upper storey contains three symmetrically aligned double hung windows. The east elevation contains two rectangular windows located towards the rear of the two-storeyed section at ground and first floor levels. The corrugated iron clad roof to the single-storeyed section, which is supported on timber trusses, is gabled with internal gutter to the side wall parapets and extends back to a stepped gable rear wall. This wall has a single loading bay entrance.

The walls to the interior of the ground floor of the building are finished in plaster. The interior of the side walls have a blind arch configuration. The ceiling is narrow tongue and groove boarding with a timber cornice. The remains of a timber stair with a geometric pattern balustrade survive in the northeast corner of the ground floor of the front section. The stair flight up to the intermediate landing has been removed. The timber floors to the ground floor of the front and rear sections of the building have been replaced in concrete; there is evidence of these original floors surviving on the walls. A wide opening has been made in the adjoining wall between the front and rear sections and an original door opening exists under the stair. A strong room exists that opens into the front section of the ground floor but is situated in the rear section.

The upper floor of the building is divided into rooms off a central hall by three quarter height tongue and groove panelled partitions with glazing over. The ceiling is tongue and groove similar to the ground floor. A trap door is centrally positioned in the floor at the top of the stair.

== Heritage listing ==
The former Jack and Newell Building was listed on the Queensland Heritage Register on 22 November 1996 having satisfied the following criteria.

The place is important in demonstrating the evolution or pattern of Queensland's history.

The former Jack & Newell Building is important in illustrating the early 20th century establishment of Cairns as the principal port of Far North Queensland. In particular, it illustrates the development of port facilities and improved warehousing in the Wharf St district following establishment of the Cairns Harbour Board in 1906. For over 6 decades the building was associated with 3 firms of important North Queensland shipping and forwarding agents, and is rare surviving evidence of the role of such firms in the development of Cairns as a major regional port.

The place demonstrates rare, uncommon or endangered aspects of Queensland's cultural heritage.

The building is the last remaining early 20th century warehouse in what was formerly a vibrant commercial district based on wharf activities. Along with the nearby Barrier Reef Hotel, it is one of only two buildings which survive to illustrate the early-established and important connection between the businesses in the Wharf-Abbott-Lake Street area and the adjacent wharves.

The place is important in demonstrating the principal characteristics of a particular class of cultural places.

The former Jack & Newell Building demonstrates the principal characteristics of a masonry warehouse associated with shipping and commission agency work, illustrated in particular by the survival of office partitioning on the upper floor, display space on the lower floor of the front section, and warehousing facilities in the rear single-storeyed section. The relationship between the double and single storeyed sections of the building remains clear, and adds to our understanding of the functioning of an early 20th century Queensland shipping agency business. The inclusion of a small upper-storey front balcony is indicative of the physical and functional relationship of the building to the wharves opposite.

The place is important because of its aesthetic significance.

The building retains a characteristic local streetscape pattern of building dimension and scale, particularly in its local variance of classical facade decoration, and survives as a marker of the earlier streetscape.

The place has a strong or special association with a particular community or cultural group for social, cultural or spiritual reasons.

The building has a strong association for the Cairns community with the growth of the commercial district associated with the wharves, and remains a symbol of early 20th century shipping activity in Cairns, when the town was developing into the principal port of far North Queensland.

The place has a special association with the life or work of a particular person, group or organisation of importance in Queensland's history.

It has had a strong association with 3 important North Queensland-based shipping agencies: Fearnley & Co. Ltd, Bartlams Ltd, and Jack & Newell & Co. Although erected for Fearnley & Co., the building has been associated mostly (1939–76) with Jack & Newell & Co., who had traded from Wharf Street since the late 1890s.
