= Herberton War Memorial =

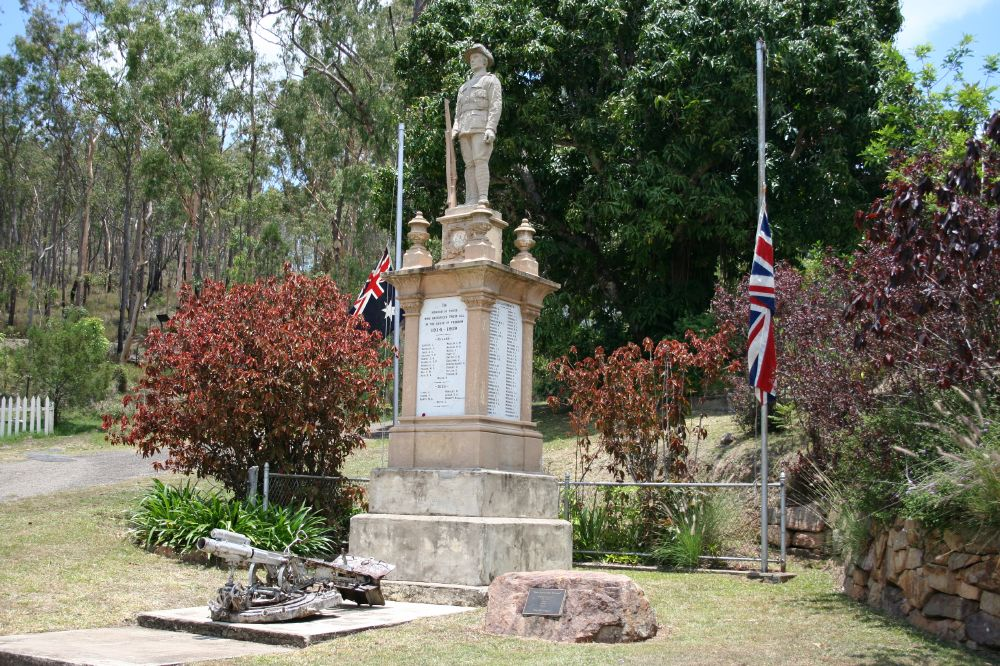
- Herberton War Memorial, 2011

- Location within Queensland
- 17.3853°S 145.3869°E
- Location: Myers Street, Herberton, Tablelands Region, Queensland, Australia

History
- Design period: 1919–1930s (interwar period)
- Built: 1922

Site notes
- Architect: Andrew Lang Petrie and Son

Queensland Heritage Register
- Official name: Herberton War Memorial
- Type: state heritage (built)
- Designated: 21 October 1992
- Reference no.: 600541
- Significant period: 1920s– (social); 1920s (historical, fabric)
- Significant components: pathway/walkway, memorial – soldier statue, flagpole/flagstaff, war trophy/ies, memorial surrounds/railings
- Builders: Andrew Lang Petrie and Son

Herberton War Memorial is a heritage-listed memorial at Myers Street, Herberton, Tablelands Region, Queensland, Australia. It was designed and built by Andrew Lang Petrie and Son in 1922. It was added to the Queensland Heritage Register on 21 October 1992.

== History ==
The Herberton War Memorial was unveiled on 3 May 1922 by Queensland Premier Ted Theodore. Funds were raised by local residents and the monument was commissioned from Andrew Lang Petrie. The stone memorial honours the 199 local men who enlisted during the First World War, including the 21 who were killed and the 7 who died on service.

The town of Herberton was settled following the discovery of tin in 1880. It was surveyed in August of the same year and rapidly expanded during the following decade. In October 1910 the Tablelands railway was extended to Herberton from Cairns, assisting in making the town a focal point for the surrounding district of mineral processing and pastoral industries.

The memorial forms a dominant landmark, situated on a hillside overlooking the town. A captured gun (war trophy) completes the setting.

Australia, and Queensland in particular, had few civic monuments before the First World War. The memorials erected in its wake became our first national monuments, recording the devastating impact of the war on a young nation. Australia lost 60,000 from a population of about 4 million, representing one in five of those who served. No previous or subsequent war has made such an impact on the nation.

Even before the end of the war, memorials became a spontaneous and highly visible expression of national grief. To those who erected them, they were as sacred as grave sites, substitute graves for the Australians whose bodies lay in battlefield cemeteries in Europe and the Middle East. British policy decreed that the Empire war dead were to be buried where they fell. The word "cenotaph", commonly applied to war memorials at the time, literally means "empty tomb".

Australian war memorials are distinctive in that they commemorate not only the dead. Australians were proud that their first great national army, unlike other belligerent armies, was composed entirely of volunteers, men worthy of honour whether or not they paid the supreme sacrifice. Many memorials honour all who served from a locality, not just the dead, providing valuable evidence of community involvement in the war. Such evidence is not readily obtainable from military records, or from state or national listings, where names are categorised alphabetically or by military unit.

Australian war memorials are also valuable evidence of imperial and national loyalties, at the time, not seen as conflicting; the skills of local stonemasons, metalworkers and architects; and of popular taste. In Queensland, the digger (soldier) statue was the popular choice of memorial, whereas the obelisk predominated in the southern states, possibly a reflection of Queensland's larger working-class population and a lesser involvement of architects.

Many of the First World War monuments have been updated to record local involvement in later conflicts, and some have fallen victim to unsympathetic re-location and repair.

Although there are many different types of memorials in Queensland, the digger statue is the most common. It was the most popular choice of communities responsible for erecting the memorials, embodying the ANZAC spirit and representing the qualities of the ideal Australian: loyalty, courage, youth, innocence and masculinity. The digger was a phenomenon peculiar to Queensland, perhaps due to the fact that other states had followed Britain's lead and established Advisory Boards made up of architects and artists, prior to the erection of war memorials. The digger statue was not highly regarded by artists and architects who were involved in the design of relatively few Queensland memorials.

Most statues were constructed by local masonry firms, although some were by artists or imported.

At this time, A L Petrie and Son of Toowong were the most prolific. They were the largest masonry firm in Queensland at this time and were responsible for many First World War memorials throughout the state. Some statues differed in detailing, although most were supplied on a range of standard pedestals.

This monument is an intact example of the workmanship of A L Petrie. It incorporates a standard type of pedestal first used in 1918 at Upper Coomera and subsequently in many other Queensland locations. The monument was painted in 1974.

Of particular interest is the inclusion of the name of an aboriginal (designated as such) listed among those who died in service.

== Description ==
The First World War Memorial is situated in a dominant position on a hill overlooking the town. The memorial is surrounded by kerbing and a wire mesh panel (once a fence) with flagstaffs at each end stands behind it. A path leads to the memorial and various gardens, plantings and steps contribute to the setting. A gun or "war trophy" is located in front of the monument.

The painted sandstone memorial comprises a substantial pedestal surmounted by a digger statue.

The monument itself sits on a stone base step above two white painted concrete steps. A square recessed marble pillar projects from the base and bears the leaded names of the 199 local men who served in the First World War, including the 21 fallen and the 7 who died on service. One of those who died on service, one is designated as aboriginal. At each corner are engaged square pillars with Corinthian capitals. These support a simple cornice surmounted by four urns.

The digger statue stands on a pedestal which has a relief carved, green painted laurel wreath on the front face and relief carved crossed flags at the rear. The soldier statue stands erect, with his rifle at his side. The left foot is placed slightly in front of the right. His uniform is painted khaki green, as is his hat.

The entire monument is heavily painted in various colours.

== Heritage listing ==
Herberton War Memorial was listed on the Queensland Heritage Register on 21 October 1992 having satisfied the following criteria.

The place is important in demonstrating the evolution or pattern of Queensland's history.

War Memorials are important in demonstrating the pattern of Queensland's history as they are representative of a recurrent theme that involved most communities throughout the state. They provide evidence of an era of widespread Australian patriotism and nationalism, particularly during and following the First World War.

It is unique in that lists an aboriginal amongst those who died in service.

The place is important in demonstrating the principal characteristics of a particular class of cultural places.

The monuments manifest a unique documentary record and are demonstrative of popular taste in the inter-war period.

Unveiled in the early 1920s, the memorial at Herberton demonstrates the principal characteristics of a commemorative structure erected as an enduring record of a major historical event. This is achieved through the use of appropriate materials and design elements. As a digger statue it is representative of the most popular form of memorial in Queensland

The place is important because of its aesthetic significance.

It is an uncommon example of a memorial still located in its original surrounds and has aesthetic value both as a dominant landmark and for its high degree of workmanship and design.

The place has a strong or special association with a particular community or cultural group for social, cultural or spiritual reasons.

The memorial has a strong association with the community as evidence of the impact of a major historic event.

The place has a special association with the life or work of a particular person, group or organisation of importance in Queensland's history.

It also has a special association with Brisbane monumental masonry firm A L Petrie and Son.
