= William Wright Virtue =

Engineer and co-founder of the Moffat-Virtue Company (1863–1926)

William Wright Virtue (27 March 1863 – 18 September 1926) was an engineer known for establishing the Moffat-Virtue Company along with John Moffat. He became a member of The First Church of Christ, Scientist and, along with his wife, became one of the first of its practitioners in Australia.

== Biography ==
Virtue was born in Glasgow, Scotland on March 27, 1863. His parents were Hannah Roy and George Wright Virtue, and two of his four siblings died in childhood. Virtue graduated in with a degree in chemistry from Glasgow Mechanics' Institution in 1878, winning medals and topping his class every year. Virtue married Harriet McDougal on 23 June 1886 in Glasgow; they had a son and two daughters.

Virtue and his family moved to Australia, settling in Sydney around 1891, where he worked with John Moffat to engineer and patent several improvements to sheep shearing devices and start the Moffat-Virtue Sheep Shearing Machine Co. in the early 1890s. The company was restructured into two companies, Moffat-Virtue Ltd and the Federal Sheep Shearing Co., and by 1914 'Moffat-Virtue' became a household name in rural Australia.

Virtue traveled overseas considerably in his work, especially to the United States and Britain. In Boston he encountered Christian Science in 1898, receiving class instruction from Julia Bartlett, a student of the religion's founder Mary Baker Eddy. He sent literature to his wife, who was a semi-invalid, and she also joined the church and traveled to Boston in 1899; and both became Christian Science practitioners. The two of them were among the earliest practitioners in Australia, and held the city's first Christian Science meetings at their home in Sydney. William Virtue was the first contributor from Australia to the Christian Science Sentinel, a periodical produced by the church, and in September 1900 helped establish the Christian Science Society of Sydney, which in December 1902 became First Church of Christ, Scientist, Sydney. He and his wife served as First and Second readers.

Virtue retired from his position of managing director at Moffat-Virtue in 1922, although he remained somewhat involved in the company. He died in 1926, and was survived by his wife, his two daughters, and one son, Graham Virtue, who at the time was serving in his father's old position as managing director of the Moffat-Virtue company.
