= John Newell (Queensland politician) =

Australian politician

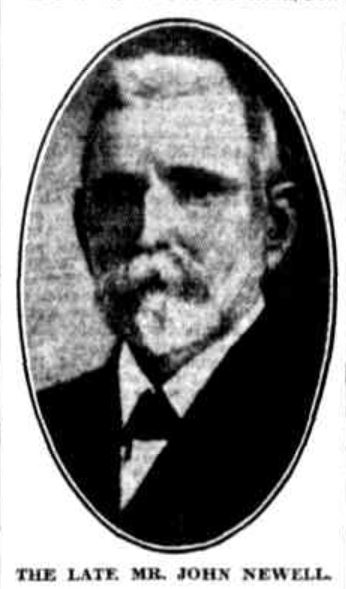
- The late Mr John Newell, following his death in 1932

Member of the Queensland Legislative Assembly for Woothakata
- In office 11 April 1896 – 11 March 1902
- Preceded by: William Rawlings
- Succeeded by: Michael Woods

Personal details
- Born: John Newell; 30 November 1848 County Down, Ireland
- Died: 20 July 1932 (aged 83) Herberton, Queensland, Australia
- Resting place: Herberton Cemetery
- Party: Ministerial
- Spouse: Janet Jack (m.1885 d.1947)
- Occupation: Storekeeper

John Newell (30 November 1849 – 29 July 1932) was a member of the Queensland Legislative Assembly.

== Early life ==
Newell was born at "The Hollow", County Down, Ireland, the son of the James Newell and his wife Margaret (née McDowall). He was educated at Drumaghlis National School. He spent seven years working as a clerk in Belfast.

== Business life ==
Newell immigrated to Queensland arriving in Brisbane in 1872 aboard the Gauntlet. He moved to Cooktown in 1875 but was back in a year later where he worked for a mercantile company.

In 1877 he was back in North Queensland, this time in Smithfield, working as a store manager. In 1879 he was with a party that discovered a lode of tin in Herberton and in 1882 he joined with future brother-in-law William Jack in opening the successful storekeeping firm, Jack & Newell.

== Public life ==
Newell was a member of the Tinaroo and Herberton shire councils and the chairman of Herberton in 1888–1889. As a member of the Ministerialists, he then won the seat of Woothakata at the 1896 Queensland colonial election, defeating the sitting member, William Rawlings. He held Woothakata for six years, retiring at the 1902 state election.

== Personal life ==
On 21 January 1885 he married Janet Jack (died 1947) at Watsonville and together had two sons and two daughters.

== Later life ==
Newell died in July 1932 and was buried in the Herberton Cemetery.

Two of the buildings of Jack & Newell are now heritage-listed:

- Jack & Newell General Store in Herberton
- Jack & Newell Building in Cairns

== Legacy ==
The town and locality of Newell in the Shire of Douglas is named after him.

| Preceded by William Rawlings | Member for Woothakata; 1896–1902 | Succeeded by Michael Woods |
