= Historic Village Herberton =

Open-air museum in Herberton, Queensland, Australia

Coordinates: 17.3743°S 145.3850°E

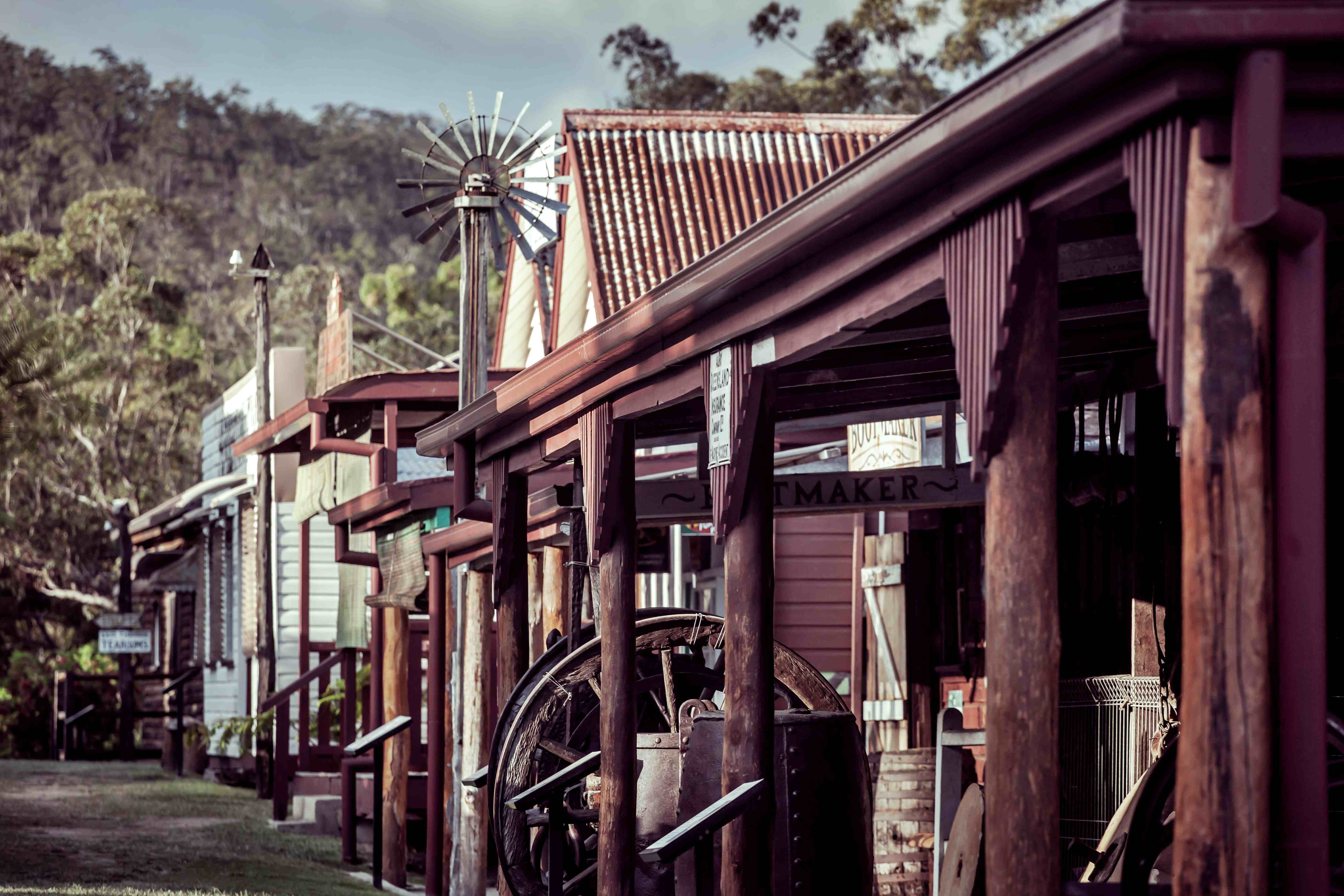
Street scene at Historic Village Herberton

The Historic Village Herberton is an open-air historic museum in Herberton, Queensland. It was opened in 1977 by then Queensland Premier Joh Bjelke Petersen and was owned by Harry and Ellen Skenner, who closed it in April 2003 due to escalating public liability costs. It was reopened in 2009 by Just Jeans retail chain store founder Craig Kimberly and his wife Connie. The Village is located on a 16-acre site and comprises over 50 historically restored period buildings dating back to the 1860s, set out like a tin mining town. It is the largest private collection of its type in Queensland.

== History ==
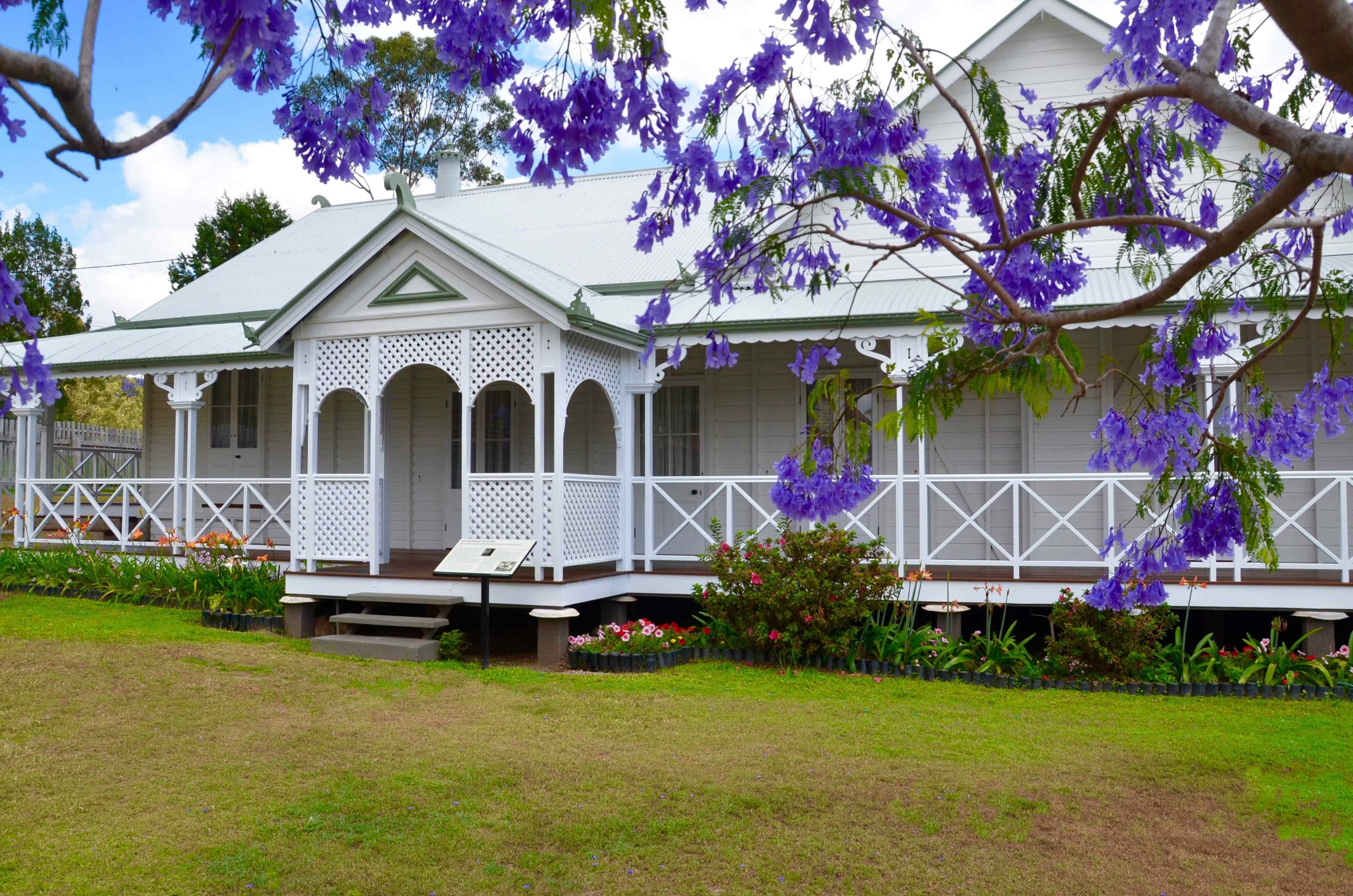
Elderslie House, the village's first building, was restored and opened to the public in 2015.

A miner’s hut, built for John Newell and called Elderslie House, was the first building on the site when the Village was created in 1973. John Newell and William Jack were credited as being the founders of Herberton. The 100-year-old Herberton State School building was added to the Village in 1978 followed by the Herberton Catholic Presbytery, which was built in the 1920s. Among the displays today are the Tin Pannikin Pub, built by Harry Skenner as an ode to Ettamoggah Pub immortalised in Ken Maynard’s comic strip, and Bishop Feetham's Cottage, a National Trust listed building.

In 2008, the Village was bought by Craig and Connie Kimberley, who had a holiday home in Port Douglas and spotted the abandoned village while driving through the region. They started restoring and expanding the Village in 2009. They opened Elderslie House to the public for the first time in 2015.

== Displays ==
The historic Village reopened on April 5, 2009 with 30 buildings and now has more than 50 buildings and over 150,000 exhibits. Among the displays are a coach and livery stable, ANZ bank, presbytery, telephone exchange, blacksmith shop, garage, dress shop, toy store, grocery store, farmer’s supplier’s store, butcher, pub, dentist, doctor, clothing store and jail. The museum also includes memorabilia from Herberton’s foundation years including vintage toys, clothing, bottles, medicine tins, cars, fire engines and horse carts.

== Awards ==
Herberton Historic Village awards include a bronze in the Cultural Tourism section at the Queensland Tourism Awards in 2015 and 2013 and a gold at the Tropical North Queensland Tourism Awards in 2014.
