= Electoral district of Woothakata =

Former state electoral district of Queensland, Australia

Woothakata Queensland—Legislative Assembly
- State: Queensland
- Created: 1888
- Abolished: 1912
- Namesake: Woothakata, Queensland
- Coordinates: 17°22′S 145°23′E

The electoral district of Woothakata was a Legislative Assembly electorate in the state of Queensland. It was first created in a redistribution ahead of the 1888 colonial election, and existed until the 1912 state election.

Woothakata electorate covered the western Atherton Tableland and the total catchment area of the Mitchell River on lower Cape York Peninsula, including the towns of Chillagoe and Herberton. Woothakata was abolished in the 1911 redistribution being split into the existing electoral district of Cook (northern part), the new electoral district of Eacham (eastern part) and the new electoral district of Chillagoe (south-eastern part).

== Members for Woothakata ==
The members for Woothakata were:

Member	Party	Term
William Little	none	19 May 1888 – 20 May 1893
William Rawlings	Labor	20 May 1893 – 11 Apr 1896
John Newell	Ministerial	11 Apr 1896 – 11 Mar 1902
Michael Woods	Labor	11 Mar 1902 – 18 May 1907
Michael Woods	Ministerial	18 May 1907 – 19 Nov 1907
Michael Woods	Opposition	19 Nov 1907 – 18 Feb 1908
Michael Woods	Ministerial	18 Feb 1908 – 29 Oct 1908
Michael Woods	Indep. Opposition	29 Oct 1908 – 2 Oct 1909
Ted Theodore	Labor	2 Oct 1909 – 27 Apr 1912

== See also ==
- Electoral districts of Queensland
- Members of the Queensland Legislative Assembly by year
- Category:Members of the Queensland Legislative Assembly by name
