= Michael Woods (Australian politician) =

Australian politician (1857–1934)

Mick Woods
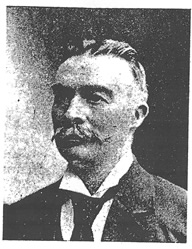

Member of the Queensland Legislative Assembly for Woothakata
- In office 11 March 1902 – 2 October 1909
- Preceded by: John Newell
- Succeeded by: Ted Theodore

Personal details
- Born: Michael Joyce Reginald Woods; 1857 Parramatta, New South Wales, Australia
- Died: 12 November 1934 (aged 76-77) Brisbane, Queensland, Australia
- Resting place: Balmoral Cemetery
- Party: Independent Opposition
- Other political affiliations: Labour, Kidstonites, Opposition
- Spouse(s): Bridget Pickering (m.1879 d.1884), Deborah Ann Gilbert (m.1888 d.1902)
- Occupation: Queensland Railways employee

Michael Joyce Reginald Woods (1857 - 12 November 1934) was a member of the Queensland Legislative Assembly.

== Biography ==
Woods was born in Parramatta, New South Wales, the son of the Michael Woods and his wife Sarah (née McCreah). He was educated in Goulburn and he spent all his working life in the railways.

On 12 August 1879 he married Bridget Pickering at Dalby and together had three sons. Bridget died in 1884 and four years later, on 23 July 1888, Woods married Deborah Ann Gilbert (died 1902) and together had three sons and three daughters. He died in Brisbane in November 1934 and his funeral proceeded from his daughter's residence in Bulimba to the Balmoral Cemetery.

== Public life ==
Woods started out in Queensland state politics as a member of the Labour Party, but in 1907 he switched to the Kidstonites for six months, then the Opposition Party for three months before rejoining the Kidstonites in February 1908. For his last year in parliament he sat as an independent Opposition member.

In 1902 he won the seat of Woothakata. He held the seat until he was defeated by future Queensland Premier, Ted Theodore in 1909.

Preceded by John Newell	Member for Woothakata; 1902–1909	Succeeded by Ted Theodore
