= Herberton =

- Town
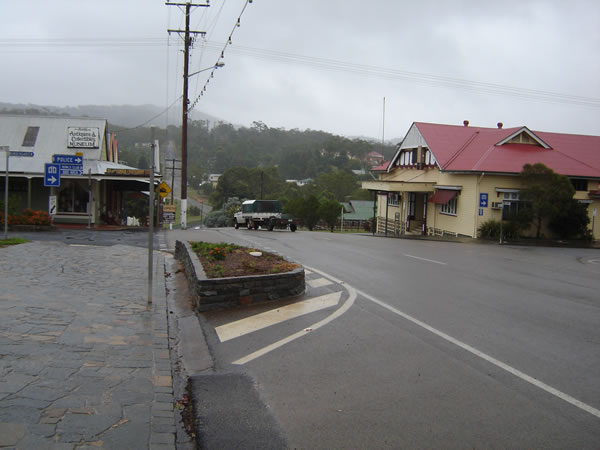
- The main street of Herberton, 2005

- Interactive map of Herberton
- Coordinates: 17.3813°S 145.3838°E
- Country: Australia
- State: Queensland
- LGA: Tablelands Region
- Location: 18.4 km (11.4 mi) SW of Atherton; 95.7 km (59.5 mi) SW of Cairns; 347 km (216 mi) NW of Townsville; 1,695 km (1,053 mi) NNW of Brisbane
- Established: 1880

Government
  - State electorate: Hill
  - Federal division: Kennedy

Area
  - Total: 23.3 km^{2} (9.0 sq mi)
- Elevation: 918 m (3,012 ft)

Population
  - Total: 895 (2021 census)
  - Density: 38.41/km^{2} (99.49/sq mi)
- Time zone: UTC+10:00 (AEST)
- Postcode: 4887
- Mean max temp: 25.4 °C (77.7 °F)
- Mean min temp: 14.4 °C (57.9 °F)
- Annual rainfall: 1,152.7 mm (45.38 in)
Localities around Herberton
Watsonville	Moomin	Moomin
Kalunga	Herberton	Wondecla
Kalunga	Wondecla	Wondecla

Herberton is a rural town and locality in the Tablelands Region, Queensland, Australia. In the 2021 census, the locality of Herberton had a population of 895 people.

== Geography ==
Herberton is on the Atherton Tableland in Far North Queensland. It is situated 918 metres (3,012 ft) high on the Great Dividing Range south-west of Atherton. Vegetation ranges from tropical rainforest to the east, wet sclerophyll forests to the north and east and open sclerophyll forests and woodlands to the north and west.

The Atherton–Herberton Road enters from the north, and Longlands Gap–Herberton Road exits to the south.

== History ==
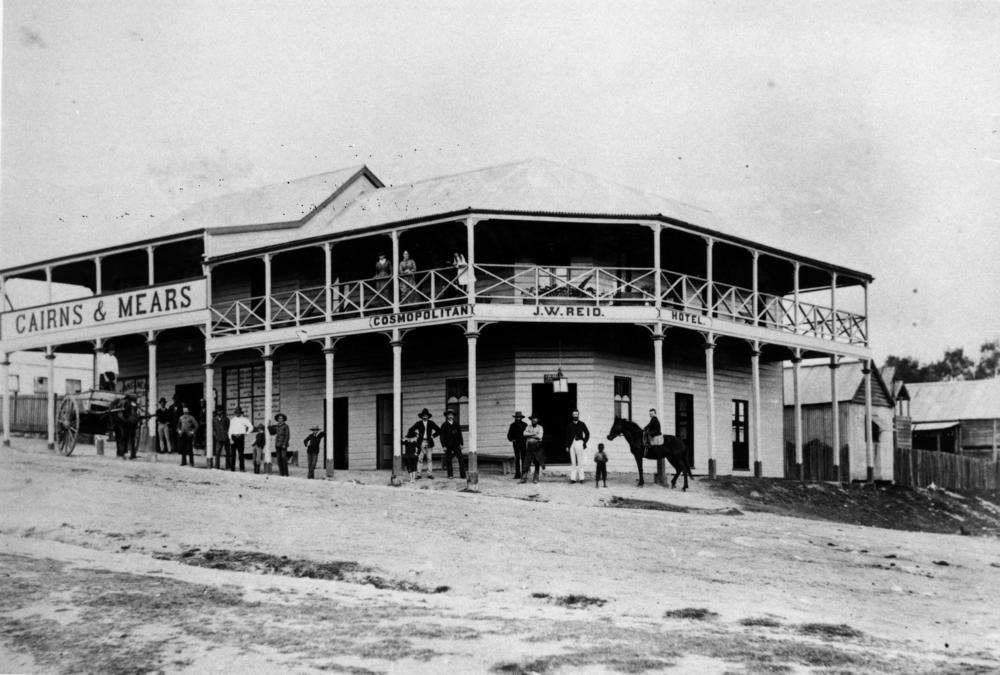
Cosmopolitan Hotel in Herberton in 1888

The first European exploration of this area, part of the traditional land of the Dyirbal, was undertaken in 1875 by James Venture Mulligan. Mulligan was prospecting for gold, but instead found tin. The town of Herberton was established on 19 April 1880 by John Newell to exploit the tin find, and mining began on 9 May 1880. By September 1880, Herberton had a population of 300 men and 27 women. Herberton Post Office opened on 22 November 1880.

The town's name is attributed to John Newell. It is believed he named it after the Herbert River whose northern tributary (Wild River) flows through Herberton and/or after Robert George Wyndham Herbert, the first Premier of Queensland (after whom the Herbert River is named).

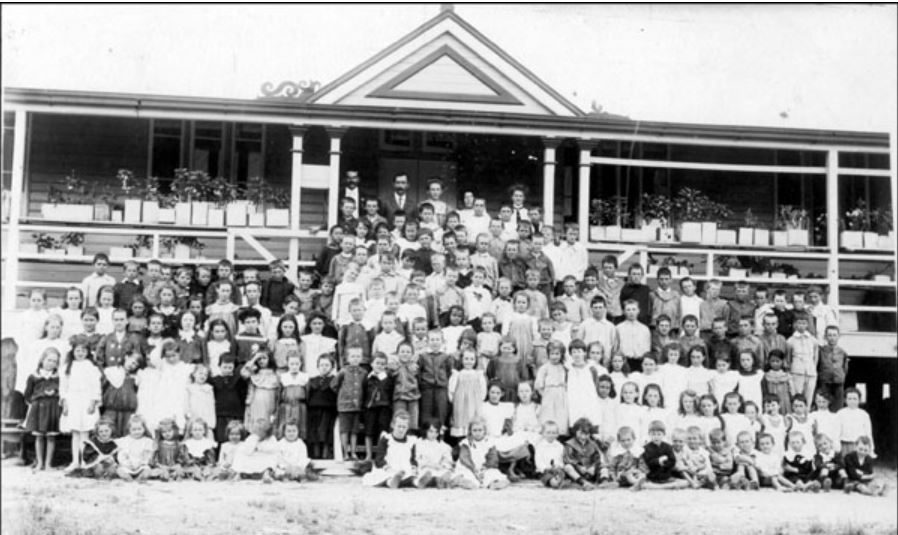
Herberton State School, 1903

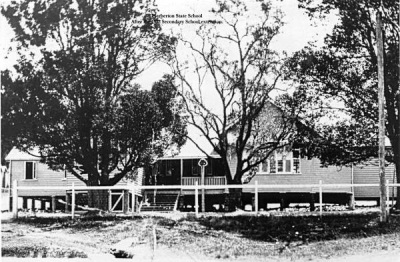
Herberton State School, 1912

In July 1881, the residents of Herberton had raised £115 for the construction of a school. Herberton Provisional School opened on 12 December 1881 with 35 students in the Herberton Hall; the fee was one shilling per week for the first child of a family with an additional sixpence a week for each additional child. In October 1882 the Queensland Government reserved five acres and two roods for a state school and called for tenders to erect a state school and teacher's residence. In November 1882 the contract for the buildings was awarded to James Pasley to construct the buildings using hardwood in nine months for £2,040. In April 1883 the Queensland Government officially announced that there would be a new state school in Herberton. The actual opening date of the new state school is unclear but Thomas Peter Wood was appointed headmaster of Herberton State School from 1 January 1884, so the school was operational at that time. In 1912 the school was one of the first five schools in Queensland to receive a secondary department, commencing operations on 15 February 1912 with the arrival of the teacher Miss Ramsay B.A. who would teach two languages, English history, mathematics, and science. In 1994, a new primary school campus was established with the secondary department remaining on the original school site.

In January 1882, the Queensland Government called for tenders to construct a telegraph line to Herberton. In March 1882 they called for tenders for a post and telegraph office.

The Herberton parish of the Roman Catholic Vicariate Apostolic of Cooktown (now the Roman Catholic Diocese of Cairns) was established in 1884. On Sunday 17 March 1889 the Bishop of Cooktown John Hutchinson blessed and opened St Patrick's Catholic church in Herberton.

Herberton Presbyterian Church was constructed in 1891, opening on 15 November 1891. In 1977 following the amalgamation of many Presbyterian churches into Uniting Church in Australia, it became the Herberton Uniting Church. On Friday 25 November 2022, the church was destroyed in a fire.

In the late 19th century, the Mulligan Highway was carved through the hills from Herberton and passed through what is now Main Street, Atherton, before continuing down to Port Douglas. This road was used by the coaches of Cobb and Co to access Western Queensland.

The tin mining in Herberton motivated the Queensland Government to build a railway line to connect Herberton to a coastal port. Three ports were considered: Port Douglas, Cairns and Geraldton (now Innisfail), all involving a crossing of the Great Dividing Range. The route from Innisfail was shortest but would go through the roughest terrain crossing the Great Dividing Range. The route from Port Douglas was the easiest to build but it would be longest. Eventually Cairns was chosen as it had the best port (and the unstable geology of the proposed Barron Gorge route was not known at that time) and the first section of the Tablelands railway from Cairns to Redlynch at the base of the range was opened on 8 October 1887. However, the railway to Herberton was not completed until 20 October 1910 by which time the tin mining boom was over. The Tablelands railway continued from Herberton to Tumoulin opening on 31 July 1911 and then to Ravenshoe opening on 11 December 1916.

St Mary's Anglican School for girls was opened in 1918 by the Sisters of the Sacred Advent. The school closed in 1965.

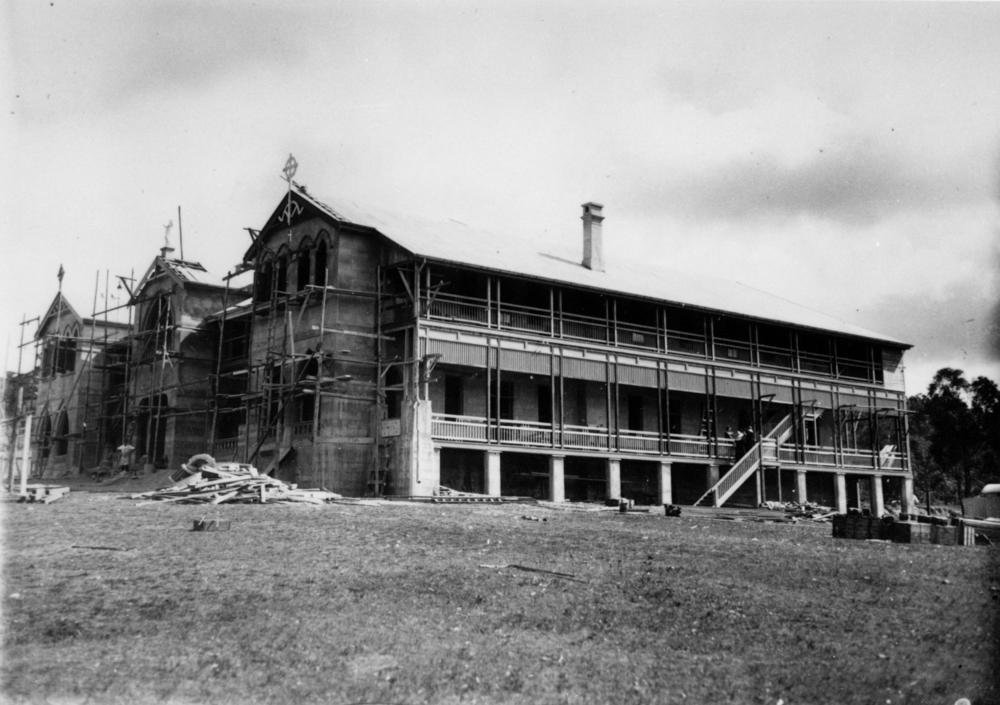
Mount St. Bernard College under construction

Mount St Bernard College was established on 1 February 1921 by the Sisters of Mercy.

The Herberton branch of the Queensland Country Women's Association opened in 1925. In 1949 the branch acquired a building in William Street and named it the Janet Newell C.W.A. Memorial Hall to commemorate the late Janet Newell, a long-serving branch president. Janet Newell was the wife of John Newell and the daughter of William Jack, the founders of Herberton and of the chain of Jack & Newell stores, the first of which was the Jack & Newell General Store in Herberton. The C.W.A. hall was officially opened by two of Janet Newell's sons.

Tin mining ceased in Herberton in 1985.

The railway line from Atherton to Ravenshoe was closed in 1988 due to the World Heritage Listing of Queensland's Wet Tropics. However, the section between Herberton and Tumoulin can still be used and the Ravenshoe Steam Railway operate heritage steam train tours along the route.

The Herberton Public Library opened in 1995 with a major refurbishment in 2016.

== Demographics ==
In the 2006 census, the town of Herberton had a population of 974 people.

In the 2011 census, the locality of Herberton had a population of 934 people.

In the 2016 census, the locality of Herberton had a population of 855 people.

In the 2021 census, the locality of Herberton had a population of 895 people.

== Heritage listings ==
Herberton has a number of heritage-listed sites, including:

- Holy Trinity Anglican Church, 38 Broadway Street (17.3802°S 145.3846°E)
- Jack & Newell General Store, Grace Street (17.3835°S 145.3849°E)
- Herberton School of Arts, 61 Grace Street (17.3843°S 145.3856°E)
- Great Northern Mine, off Jacks Road (17.3837°S 145.3901°E)
- Herberton Uniting Church (former), 2–4 Lillian Street (17.3821°S 145.386°E)
- Herberton War Memorial, Myers Street (17.3853°S 145.3869°E)

== Climate ==
Herberton is notably drier than the area around Atherton with average rainfall for Herberton of 1,154.6 mm (45.46 in). Herberton is the most northerly location in Australia to have recorded a temperature at or below −5 °C (23 °F), and also the only location in Tropical North Queensland to have done so. The average minimum temperature ranges from 10 °C (50 °F) in winter to 18 °C (64 °F) in summer, while maximums range from 21 to 29 °C (70 to 84 °F).

Climate data for Herberton (1961–1990 normals, extremes 1957–1991, 909 m (2,982 ft) AMSL)
Month	Jan	Feb	Mar	Apr	May	Jun	Jul	Aug	Sep	Oct	Nov	Dec	Year
Record high °C (°F)	35.2 (95.4)	35.2 (95.4)	32.8 (91.0)	33.0 (91.4)	30.6 (87.1)	31.1 (88.0)	28.3 (82.9)	31.7 (89.1)	33.3 (91.9)	35.7 (96.3)	38.1 (100.6)	36.7 (98.1)	38.1 (100.6)
Mean maximum °C (°F)	32.5 (90.5)	31.5 (88.7)	30.4 (86.7)	28.7 (83.7)	26.9 (80.4)	26.3 (79.3)	25.4 (77.7)	28.0 (82.4)	30.3 (86.5)	32.5 (90.5)	33.8 (92.8)	33.2 (91.8)	34.7 (94.5)
Mean daily maximum °C (°F)	28.2 (82.8)	27.5 (81.5)	26.3 (79.3)	24.6 (76.3)	22.8 (73.0)	21.5 (70.7)	21.2 (70.2)	23.0 (73.4)	25.1 (77.2)	27.2 (81.0)	29.0 (84.2)	28.8 (83.8)	25.4 (77.8)
Daily mean °C (°F)	23.2 (73.8)	23.0 (73.4)	22.0 (71.6)	20.3 (68.5)	18.4 (65.1)	15.9 (60.6)	15.6 (60.1)	16.9 (62.4)	18.8 (65.8)	20.9 (69.6)	22.8 (73.0)	23.2 (73.8)	20.1 (68.1)
Mean daily minimum °C (°F)	18.2 (64.8)	18.4 (65.1)	17.7 (63.9)	16.0 (60.8)	13.9 (57.0)	10.3 (50.5)	9.9 (49.8)	10.8 (51.4)	12.4 (54.3)	14.5 (58.1)	16.5 (61.7)	17.6 (63.7)	14.7 (58.4)
Mean minimum °C (°F)	14.2 (57.6)	15.2 (59.4)	13.2 (55.8)	11.0 (51.8)	6.9 (44.4)	2.1 (35.8)	1.8 (35.2)	4.1 (39.4)	6.6 (43.9)	8.6 (47.5)	12.3 (54.1)	13.4 (56.1)	−0.1 (31.8)
Record low °C (°F)	9.5 (49.1)	10.2 (50.4)	8.9 (48.0)	7.2 (45.0)	−1.1 (30.0)	−3.3 (26.1)	−5.0 (23.0)	−2.2 (28.0)	0.6 (33.1)	3.4 (38.1)	8.3 (46.9)	9.4 (48.9)	−5.0 (23.0)
Average rainfall mm (inches)	226.4 (8.91)	217.0 (8.54)	251.8 (9.91)	92.1 (3.63)	56.9 (2.24)	35.6 (1.40)	21.7 (0.85)	21.7 (0.85)	21.1 (0.83)	35.3 (1.39)	96.1 (3.78)	135.1 (5.32)	1,210.8 (47.65)
Average rainy days (≥ 1 mm)	14.5	15.7	16.1	13.7	10.5	7.0	5.5	4.6	4.6	4.9	8.4	10.3	115.8
Source: Bureau of Meteorology

== Tourism and attractions ==
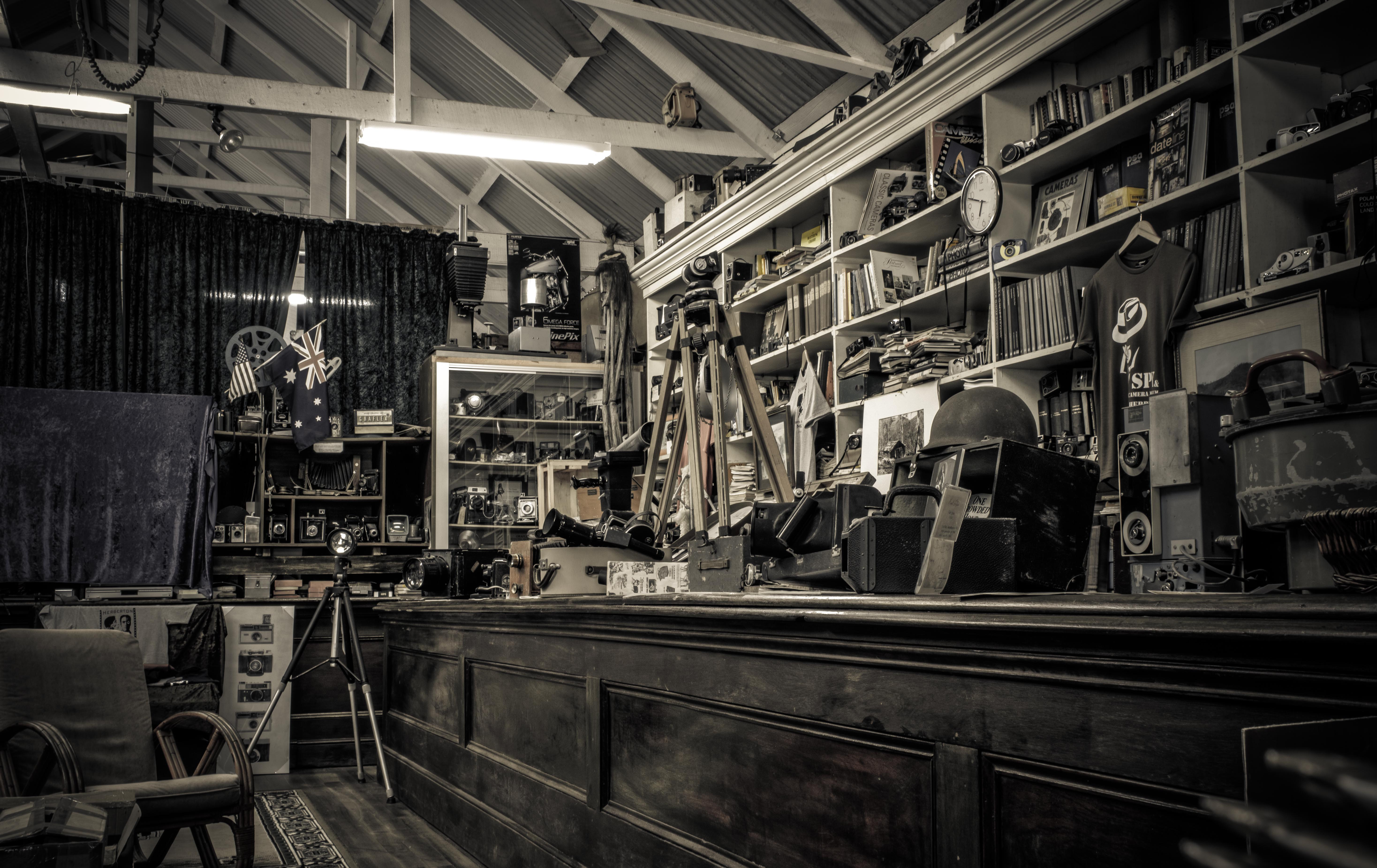
Herberton Spy & Camera Museum

The Herberton Mining Museum and Visitor Information Centre opened in 2005, houses mining and social history of the Herberton Mining field, archives for the local area and maintains a genealogy project recording the families of the district and their histories.

A Heritage Walk for tourists that takes in some of the old buildings and historical features of the town is a popular attraction. Historic Village Herberton is a 16-acre representation of a mining town filled with streets of buildings of the time, each one a museum in its own right with exhibits such as vintage machinery, cars and Australian antiques. It has more than 50 restored period buildings.

The Herberton Spy & Camera Museum houses antique spy cameras, a photographic gallery and photographic memorabilia with guided tours through the museum and a working photographer and photographic studio.

Most recently, a railway museum has been established by volunteers in the former Herberton railway station building. This is operated by volunteers and only open part-time.

The Tepon Equestrian Grounds just out of Herberton have recently been upgraded with a large undercover pavilion for equestrian and other sporting events such as cycling and mountain biking. Local markets are held on the 3rd Sunday of every month at the Wondecla Oval.

There are several caravan parks, hotels, motels and B&Bs located in the town.

Atherton Herberton Historic Railway The Atherton-Herberton Historic Railway Inc. (AHHR) is dedicated to the preservation and display of local railway memorabilia including the operation of a first-class Tourist and Historic rail journey. The AHHR is in the historic town of Herberton, the oldest town on the Atherton Tablelands and is situated amongst many other tourist attractions. AHHR has several attractions providing tourists and visitors from across the world with a rail journey on their unique Tinlander train which links Herberton to the multi award-winning outdoor museum, the Historic Village Herberton. Visitors are also taken back in time through a static museum and can view a multi-year restoration project where a 1905 built steam locomotive and 1910 timber railway carriage restoration are underway. This train attraction will be fully operational in 2021. The main business location consists of the original Herberton Railway Station, rebuilt after a fire in 1936 and provides an outlook over the existing railway lines, restored steam trains and carriages. In addition, several restoration sheds are used to repair trains and carriages to give them a new lease on life and provide additional displays for the museum. The organisation has commenced restoration to a very high standard of 3 kilometres of previously Queensland Rail maintained railway track back to an operational condition between Herberton Station and Historic Village Herberton. In addition, 2.5 kilometres of railway track from Platypus Park Station Atherton has been restored with ongoing vegetation and drainage work revitalising and maintaining the track towards Wongabel.

== Amenities ==
The Tablelands Regional Council operates a Herberton Public Library and Customer Service Centre at 61 Grace Street (the Herberton School of Arts, 17.3842°S 145.3858°E).

The Herberton branch of the Queensland Country Women's Association meets at the Janet Newell C.W.A. Memorial Hall at 14 William Street (17.3827°S 145.3861°E).

St Patrick's Catholic Church is at 2 Moffatt Street West (corner of Broadway Street, 17.3794°S 145.3840°E). It is within the Herberton Parish of the Roman Catholic Diocese of Cairns which is administered from the Atherton Parish.

Herberton Uniting Church is at 2–4 Lillian Street (17.3821°S 145.3860°E). It is part of the North Queensland Presbytery of the Uniting Church in Australia.

== Education ==
Herberton State School is a government primary and secondary (Prep–10) school for boys and girls. In 2017, the school had an enrolment of 176 students with 20 teachers (17 full-time equivalent) and 17 non-teaching staff (12 full-time equivalent). It includes a special education program. The new primary school campus constructed in 1994 is not within Herberton but on Elwyn Phillips Memorial Drive in neighbouring Moomin to the north (17.3723°S 145.3790°E). However, the secondary (7–10) campus remains at the original school site in Grace Street, Herberton (17.3805°S 145.3825°E).

Mount St Bernard College is a Catholic secondary (7–12) school for boys and girls at 15 Broadway Street (17.3793°S 145.3826°E). In 2017, the school had an enrolment of 191 students with 34 teachers (32 full-time equivalent) and 31 non-teaching staff (26 full-time equivalent).

For government secondary education to Year 12, the nearest government school is Atherton State High School in Atherton to the north-east.

== Notable people ==
Notable people associated with Herberton include:

- Bunny Adair, Member of the Queensland Legislative Assembly for Cook who attended Herberton State School.
- Alice Bonar, founder of the Australian Red Cross in Herberton, now the oldest continuously operating branch in Australia. In 1914 reconvened the branch as a member of the Australian Red Cross. Eldest son David Welbourn Bonar a tunneller at Hill 60 and daughter May was a nurse in World War I.
- Nancy Francis (1873–1954), journalist and poet known as 'Black Bonnet'. Wrote extensively on life in the Daintree area including recording indigenous culture. Wrote poetry published in North Queensland papers and The Bulletin.
- James Douglas Henry, mining engineer, served in 4th Queensland Imperial Bushmen contingent. Member of the Mining Corps then Commanding Officer of 1st Australian Tunnellers involved in Hill 60. Retired to Tepon near Herberton and ARP warden for Wondecla area in World War II.
- John Ledlie, one of the founders of North Queensland firm Armstrong, Ledlie and Stillman. Brought the first electric street lights outside his Herberton store. Shire Chairman of Herberton Shire Council, member of Cairns Harbour Board and Cairns Regional Electricity Board. Teamed with Robert Ringrose to establish Herberton State High School in 1912.
- John Newell, Member of the Queensland Legislative Assembly for Woothakata, Chairman of Herberton Shire Council, Mayor of Herberton Municipality. One of the discoverers of payable tin and the establishment of Herberton Gold and Mineral Field. Founding member of the Tinaroo Division Board.
- Robert Ringrose, barrister, geologist, naturalist, fellow of Royal Geographical Society of Queensland who established the conservation area now known as Mount Hypipamee National Park. Worked to establish the Charters Towers School of Mines and one of the first 12 state high schools in Herberton in 1912.
- Tom Risley, artist and sculptor. Trained as an electrician then worked in rainforest ecology in CSIRO. His work is held in New York Museum of Modern Art, gallery in Japan, pieces in National Gallery of Australia and Queensland Art Gallery, private collections and one of his largest sculptures is situated in the Gordon Gardens in the Herberton Mining Museum & Visitor Information Centre.
- Dallas Johnson played his junior rugby league for the Magpies, the local rugby league team the town has, and Atherton Roosters. He went on to play for NRL clubs such as Melbourne Storm, NQL Cowboys and represented QLD and Australia.
