= Shire of Herberton =

Former local government area of Australia

Coordinates: 17.3811°S 145.3841°E

- Local government area
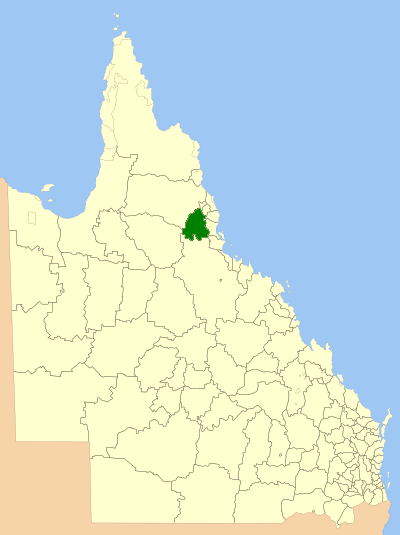
- Location within Queensland

- Country: Australia
- State: Queensland
- Region: Far North Queensland
- Established: 1895
- Council seat: Herberton

Area
  - Total: 9,607.0 km^{2} (3,709.3 sq mi)

Population
  - Total: 5,423 (2006 census)
  - Density: 0.56448/km^{2} (1.46201/sq mi)
- Website: Shire of Herberton
LGAs around Shire of Herberton
Mareeba	Atherton	Eacham
Mareeba	Shire of Herberton	Johnstone, Cardwell
Etheridge	Dalrymple	Hinchinbrook

The Shire of Herberton was a local government area of Queensland. It was located on the Atherton Tableland, a plateau forming part of the Great Dividing Range west of the city of Cairns. The shire, administered from the town of Herberton, covered an area of 9,607.0 square kilometres (3,709.3 sq mi), and existed as a local government entity from 1895 until 2008, when it amalgamated with several other councils in the Tableland area to become the Tablelands Region.

== History ==
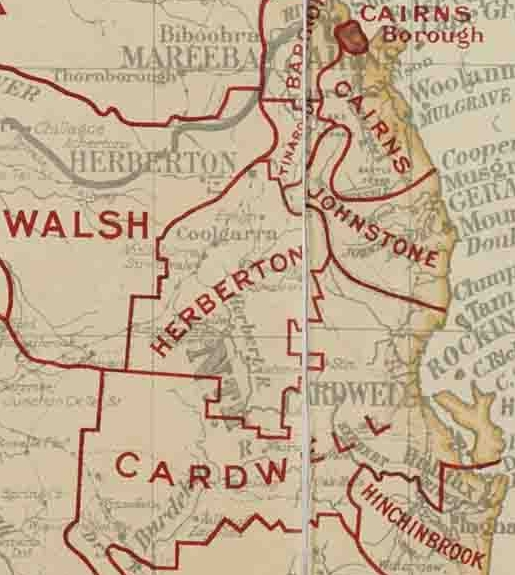
Map of Herberton Division and adjacent local government areas, March 1902

Tinaroo Division was created on 3 September 1881 under the Divisional Boards Act 1879 by amalgamating parts of Cairns, Hinchinbrook and Woothakata Divisions. It was responsible for a large area which included Herberton. On 15 September 1888, the Borough of Herberton was established to manage the affairs of the town of Herberton by excising part of Tinaroo Division. On 11 May 1895, the borough was amalgamated with the part of the Tinaroo Division around Herberton to create the Herberton Division. With the passage of the Local Authorities Act 1902, the Herberton Division became the Shire of Herberton on 31 March 1903.

On 15 March 2008, under the Local Government (Reform Implementation) Act 2007 passed by the Parliament of Queensland on 10 August 2007, the Shire of Herberton merged with the Shires of Atherton, Eacham and Mareeba to form the Tablelands Region.

== Towns and localities ==
The Shire of Herberton included the following settlements:

- Herberton
- Evelyn
- Innot Hot Springs
- Kalunga
- Millstream
- Moomin
- Mount Garnet
- Ravenshoe
- Tumoulin
- Wairuna
- Wondecla

== Chairmen ==
- 1908: Charles Harding
- 1927: F. A. Grigg

== Population ==
Year	Population
1933	2,852
1947	3,198
1954	4,150
1961	3,815
1966	3,634
1971	3,726
1976	3,679
1981	3,688
1986	4,210
1991	4,560
1996	5,113
2001	5,083
2006	5,423
