= Warrongo people =

Aboriginal Australian people

The Warruŋu, also known as the Warungu/Warrongo, were an Indigenous Australian people of the northern Queensland rainforest areas south of Cairns.

== Language ==
The Warrongo language, extinct since the death of the last speaker Alf Palmer in 1981, is classified as a member of the Maric branch of the Pama–Nyungan languages. Tsunoda Tasaku made a claim for Warungu having "the strongest syntactic ergativity" of all the world's languages. The claim has been challenged by Robert M. W. Dixon who believes that the conversational material on which it is based is vitiated by confusions in the informant.

=== Last speakers ===
- Alf Palmer, boatbuilder, who also knew Jirrbal, Girramay, and Warrgamay. His mother Lucy was one of the people pushed into the gorge to drown at Blencoe Falls.

=== Some words ===
- warrngu (woman)

== Country ==
Mount Garnet marks their northern border. From there their territory extended southeast along the Herbert River.

== Society ==
The Warrongo bore close linguistic and cultural affinities with the Gudjal and Gugu Badhun peoples, all three occupying the Herbert and Upper Burdekin rivers. Like other contiguous groups of this area, the Warrango divided their members into four "skin" sections:

- gorgorro (polite form:goynba), totem = carpet snake(gabol)/sparrowhawk (garrgay)
- gorgilla (polite form:woragaja), totem = crow (wajagan)/eaglehawk (gorrijala)
- won.go (polite form:wolmirri), totem = echidna (barrbira)/dove (?gorraga)
- wojorro (polite formn:yawonya), totem = eagelhawk/carpet snake/emu (gondolo) (Note: These are the male terms. Women of the same groups are referred to by applying a female suffix)

== History of contact ==
Tin was discovered in the vicinity of Warrongo territory, (Note: It is not quite clear whether this was Warrongo or Ngaygungu territory) in the Wild river area in 1880. John Atherton's Cashmere station, and the Gunnawarra station, were established on their territory in the mid-1870s. The surging influx of miners led to many clashes and massacres. At Blencoe Falls, a group of Warrongo were driven off the cliffs to plunge into the gorge. Very little knowledge survived of these people.

== Sources ==
- Dixon, R. M. W. (1972). The Dyirbal Language of North Queensland. Cambridge University Press. p. 339. ISBN 978-0-521-08510-6.
- Dixon, R. M. W. (1994). Ergativity. Cambridge University Press. p. 180. ISBN 978-0-521-44898-7.
- Dixon, R. M. W. (2011). Searching for Aboriginal Languages: Memoirs of a Field Worker. Cambridge University Press. ISBN 978-1-108-02504-1.
- Menghetti, Diane (1984). Charters Towers (PDF) (Ph.D. thesis). James Cook University.
- Sutton, Peter (1973). Gugu-Badhun and its neighbours: A Linguistic Salvage Study (PDF). Macquarie University MA Thesis. ISBN 978-0-521-59971-9.
- Tindale, Norman Barnett (1974). "Warungu (QLD)". Aboriginal Tribes of Australia: Their Terrain, Environmental Controls, Distribution, Limits, and Proper Names. Australian National University.
- Tsunoda, Tasaku (1974). A grammar of the Warungu language, North Queensland (M.A. thesis). Monash University.
- Tsunoda, Tasaku (2012). A Grammar of Worrongo. Walter de Gruyter. ISBN 978-3-110-23877-8.
