= Pterostylis thulia =

Scientific classification
- Kingdom: Plantae
- Clade: Embryophytes
- Clade: Tracheophytes
- Clade: Spermatophytes
- Clade: Angiosperms
- Clade: Monocots
- Order: Asparagales
- Family: Orchidaceae
- Subfamily: Orchidoideae
- Tribe: Cranichideae
- Genus: Pterostylis
- Species: P. thulia

Binomial name
- Pterostylis thulia (D.L.Jones) Janes & Duretto

Synonyms
- Oligochaetochilus thulius D.L.Jones

Species of orchid

Pterostylis thulia is a species of orchid endemic to northern Queensland, Australia. It has a rosette of leaves at the base or the plant and up to five flowers with transparent and pale brown flowers with a bristly, insect-like labellum.

== Description ==
Pterostylis thulia has a rosette of four to seven sessile, overlapping, elliptic, oblong or egg-shaped leaves, 5–25 mm (0.20–0.98 in) long and 3–9 mm (0.12–0.35 in) wide at the base of the plant. Up to five flowers are borne on a flowering scape 50–200 mm (2.0–7.9 in) tall each flower on a thin pedicel 3–6 mm (0.12–0.24 in) long. The dorsal sepal and petals are fused, forming a hood or "galea" over the column. The galea is slightly curved and transparent with light brown markings, the petals nearly touching and closing off the base of the gales. The dorsal sepal is 13–18 mm (0.51–0.71 in) long with a point 7–13 mm (0.28–0.51 in) long. The lateral sepals are turned down, 5–8 mm (0.20–0.31 in) long and wide with thread-like points 15–22 mm (0.59–0.87 in) long and spreading apart at the tips. The labellum is insect-like and attached by a claw about 1.5 mm (0.059 in) long, oblong in the lower part then tapered, 3–4 mm (0.12–0.16 in) long, 1.6–2 mm (0.063–0.079 in) wide and reddish-brown with ten to sixteen prominent white bristles up to 3 mm (0.12 in) long and projecting forwards. Flowering occurs from July to September, and the seed capsule is elliptic, 8–10 mm (0.31–0.39 in) long and 3–4 mm (0.12–0.16 in) wide.

== Taxonomy ==
This species was first formally described in 2010 by David Jones who gave it the name Oligochaetochilus thulius in the journal The Orchadian from a specimen he collected near Blencoe Falls on the Herbert River in 1971. In the same year, Jasmine Janes and Marco Duretto changed the name to Pterostylis thulia. The specific epithet (thulia) is derived from the Ancient Greek word Thoule meaning "farthest north" since this species is the most northerly occurring member of the genus known to date.

== Distribution and habitat ==
Pterostylis thulia is only known from the type location where it grows among grass tussocks and rocks in open forest at altitudes from 450 to 500 m (1,480 to 1,640 ft).
