= Warrongo =

Warrongo or Warrungu may refer to:

- Warrongo people of Queensland, Australia
- Warrongo language spoken by them
- Warrangu: River Story, a 2024 album by Dobby
