= Seaview Range =

Mountain range in Australia

Seaview
- Location within Queensland

Geography
- Country: Australia
- State: Queensland
- Region: Far North Queensland
- Range coordinates: 18°38.4′S 145°53.05′E
- Parent range: Great Dividing Range

The Seaview Range, part of the Great Dividing Range, is a mountain range located west of Ingham in North Queensland, Australia. Much of the range is covered by rainforest and parts of it are protected in the Girringun National Park and the Wet Tropics of Queensland world heritage area.

The range is the headwaters for the Burdekin River, the Herbert River and contains Wallaman Falls.

== History ==
The Seaview Range was first explored by Frederick Manson Bailey in 1873. It was nominated for listing on the National Heritage Register in 1978.

== See also ==
- List of mountains in Queensland
