= Gugu-Badhun =

Aboriginal Australian people

Gugu Badhun
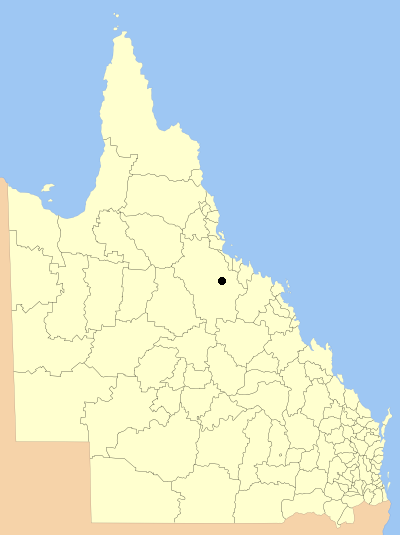
- Gugu Badhun traditional lands

Total population
- 1000-2000

Regions with significant populations
- Australia (Queensland)

Languages
- English, formerly Warrongo language and Gugu Badhun language

The Gugu Badhun are an Aboriginal nation whose country is located in the Upper Burdekin region of northern Queensland. Gugu Badhun country is approximately 220 km northwest of Townsville and includes the small township of Greenvale as well as a number of pastoral stations. The most comprehensive and up-to-date description of the nation is found in the book Gugu Badhun: People of the Valley of Lagoons, published in 2017.

== Language ==
Gugu Badhun is considered, with the Gudjal language, to be a dialect of the Warrongo subgroup of Greater Maric. The Gugu Badhun dialect has dental consonants, in contrast to the rest of Warrongo.

== Country ==
Norman Tindale estimated that the Gugu Badhun, or as he wrote it, Kokopatun, occupy roughly 1,300 square miles (3,400 km^{2}) of territory lying east of the Great Dividing Range. He asserted that their northern boundary lay at Mount Garnet, and that their eastward extension stretched as far as Gunnawarra and the Herbert River. He put their southern frontier at the Dry River and Meadowbank.

His definition of the northern boundary was quickly challenged by Robert Dixon and Peter Sutton who stated that the northern boundary was flawed, with its stretch from Mount Garnet to the Herbert River actually being in Warungu territory.

Sutton (1973, p. 14) describes Gugu Badhun country in the following way:

The Gugu Badhun inhabited the Upper Burdekin (on both sides of the river), north to Meadowbank, Glenharding and Wairuna Stations, where they had their border with the Warungu. Their southern border was the Clarke River, about where it joins the Burdekin. There they met the Gudjal. These three tribes, running north to south, formed something of a unity.

The landscape of Gugu Badhun country was formed through lava flows from Kinrara volcano, which erupted 7000 years ago. The country centres on a region known as the Valley of Lagoons. The region gets its name from a number of vast, but shallow, lagoons near the Burdekin River. Some of these lagoons dry out during the prolonged dry season common to North Queensland, but others are permanent, spring-fed lagoons. The year-round water supply maintains a diverse array of birdlife, kangaroos and other mammals, and today, beef cattle. Cadet-James et al. (2017, p. 1-2) describe the landscape:

Along the watercourses, the vegetation is thick and green, but away from the water it changes dramatically. Here, the countryside is predominantly open eucalypt woodland, dominated by ironbarks and with an understory of grass. While not arid country, it is certainly not lush. Grey kangaroos and agile wallabies are the most obvious mammals, but possums, echidna, bandicoots and many others live here too. Large birds include emu and bustards, while apostle-birds, honeyeaters and parrots provide a noisy background to this archetypal Australian bush setting. In places where the basalt is on the surface, the land may appear barren, but beneath the surface the fissured rock provides the source of the life-giving springs of water that nourish these lands.

=== Native title ===
Gugu Badhun people hold native title over approximately 6,540 square kilometres (2,530 mi^{2}) through the Gugu Badhun People #2 Consent Determination on 1 August 2012. The Gugu Badhun Aboriginal Corporation (GBAC) is the Registered Native Title Body Corporate (RNTBC), also sometimes referred to as the Prescribed Body Corporate (PBC), incorporated under the Corporations (Aboriginal and Torres Strait Islander) Act 2006 (Cth) (CATSI). GBAC holds and exercises the native title rights and interests as the agent of the Gugu Badhun People.

== People ==
The Gugu Badhun people have maintained an ongoing connection to the land known as Gugu Badhun country. Gugu Badhun people have experienced colonisation and dispossession from land, but their story "is a story of achievement in the face of adversity".

The first European contact with Gugu Badhun people was Ludwig Leichhardt's exploratory party in 1845, making them among the first inland Aboriginal nations in Northern Australia to encounter Europeans. The explorers were followed, in the 1860s, by Native Police who attempted to violently "clear out" Gugu Badhun country to make way for settlers. The scrubby landscape meant that Gugu Badhun were able to resist these incursions for approximately 20 years. Eventually, though, many Gugu Badhun people "came in" and worked on cattle stations, and contemporary Gugu Badhun people maintain strong relationships with pastoral families in the region.

In the 1930s and 1940s, many Gugu Badhun people who had remained on country decided to move to the nearby towns and cities for education and employment opportunities. Gugu Badhun man, Dick Hoolihan, rose to prominence as a political activist:

"At that stage, when I got to know him [Dick Hoolihan], I didn't understand this until later, that he was born on the Valley of Lagoons in a cave, grew up, educated himself and unbeknown to me, he was an Aboriginal activist in the 1950s. He was the first President of the Townsville Aboriginal Advancement League. He came out of the Act situation. He led a bit of a rebellion of all the Aboriginal stockmen in the upper Burdekin. He encouraged them not to sign up on the employment contracts. He was a bit of a radical person. Then he joined the Communist Party. When he came to Townsville, he was very heavily involved in Aboriginal affairs in the '50s" (Noel Gertz, quoted in Cadet-James et al, 2017, p.100).

Today, Gugu Badhun people gather on country annually for a Culture Camp which reinforces community ties, connection to country, and cultural values. Like all identities, the Gugu Badhun identity has evolved since before contact with Europeans, but Gugu Badhun people strongly identify with their culture, country, and community.

== Sources ==
- Cadet-James, Yvonne; James, Robert Andrew; McGinty, Sue; McGregor, Russell (2017). Gugu Badhun: People of the Valley of Lagoons. Canberra: AIATSIS Research Publications. ISBN 978-1922102645.
- Cohen, Benjamin E.; Mark, Darren F.; Fallon, Stewart J.; Stephenson, P. Jon (April 2017). "Holocene-Neogene volcanism in northeastern Australia: Chronology and eruption history" (PDF). Quaternary Geochronology. 39: 79–91. Bibcode:2017QuGeo..39...79C. doi:10.1016/j.quageo.2017.01.003.
- Dixon, Robert M. W. (2002). Australian Languages: Their Nature and Development. Vol. 1. Cambridge University Press. ISBN 978-0-521-47378-1.
- James, Robert Andrew (2009). A modern history of the Gugu Badhun people and their country (PDF) (MA thesis). James Cook University.
- Menghetti, Diane (1984). Charters Towers (PDF) (Ph.D. thesis). James Cook University.
- "National Native Title Register Details". National Native Title Tribunal.
- Sutton, Peter (1973). Gugu-Badhun and its neighbours: A Linguistic Salvage Study (PDF) (MA thesis). Macquarie University.
- Tindale, Norman Barnett (1974). "Kokopatun (QLD)". Aboriginal Tribes of Australia: Their Terrain, Environmental Controls, Distribution, Limits, and Proper Names. Australian National University.
- "WHO WE ARE". Gugu Badhun.
