= Atlas of the World's Languages in Danger =

UNESCO publication of endangered languages

Cover page of the book's third edition

The UNESCO Atlas of the World's Languages in Danger was an online publication containing a comprehensive list of the world's endangered languages. It originally replaced the Red Book of Endangered Languages as a title in print after a brief period of overlap before being transferred to an online-only publication.

== History ==
In 1992, the International Congress of Linguists (CIPL) meeting in Canada discussed the topic of endangered languages, as a result of which it formed the Endangered Languages Committee. It held an international meeting, also in 1992, in Paris, to place the topic before the world and initiate action. The meeting was considered important enough to come under the authority of UNESCO.

At the instigation of Stephen Wurm, the committee resolved to create a research center, the International Clearing House for Endangered Languages (ICHEL), and to publish the UNESCO Red Book of Endangered Languages, based on the data the committee collected. The book title was derived from the Red Book of Endangered Species. Shigeru Tsuchida was to start the research center. It began in 1994 at the University of Tokyo with Tasaku Tsunoda as its director.

Meanwhile, the initial reports on endangered languages had already been collected and submitted to UNESCO in 1993 by regional experts. The reports were subsequently turned over to ICHEL, who created a website to enable regular updates to be made available.

In February 2009, UNESCO launched an online edition of the Atlas of Endangered Languages which covered the whole world, contained more information than previous printed editions, and offered the possibility for users to provide online feedback.

Building on this foundation, in 2019, UNESCO launched a new project, the Online World Atlas of Languages (WAL), which was intended to expand the scope beyond only documenting endangered languages to documenting all languages, including sign languages. As of September 2026, the WAL is a work-in-progress and offline until further notice, while the global data set is completed and website construction is completed.

Once completed, the WAL's purpose is to provide a comprehensive, up-to-date resource for researchers, policymakers, and the general public, reflecting the diversity of the world's linguistic heritage and supporting efforts in language preservation and revitalization.

== Classification ==
UNESCO language endangerment classification

The UNESCO list developed six categories of endangerment:

- Extinct: There are no speakers left. The Atlas presumes extinction if there have been no known speakers since the 1950s.
- Critically endangered: The youngest speakers are grandparents and older, and they speak the language partially and infrequently.
- Severely endangered: The language is spoken by grandparents and older generations. While the parent generation may understand it, they do not speak it to children or among themselves.
- Definitely endangered: Children no longer learn the language as a mother tongue in the home.
- Vulnerable: Most children speak the language, but it may be restricted to certain domains (e.g. home).
- Safe / Not Endangered: Is spoken by all generations and intergenerational transmission is uninterrupted. These languages are not included in the Atlas as they are not endangered.

As of November 2025, these categories are being reviewed by UNESCO to ensure they reflect the most up-to-date information on language vitality worldwide. Updates aim to provide an accurate and reliable representation of the current status of languages, supporting efforts in documentation, preservation, and revitalization.

== See also ==
- Lists of endangered languages
