= Herbert River Falls =

- Location within Queensland
- Location: Far North Queensland, Australia
- Coordinates: 18°14′06″S 145°22′15″E
- Type: Plunge
- Elevation: 505 metres (1,657 ft)
- Total height: 56–75 metres (184–246 ft)
- Watercourse: Herbert River

The Herbert River Falls is a plunge waterfall on the Herbert River that is located in the UNESCO World Heritage–listed Wet Tropics in the Far North region of Queensland, Australia.

== Location and features ==
The falls are located on the northern boundary of the Girringun National Park, west of Cardwell, in the Cassowary Coast local government area, approximately 162 kilometres (101 mi) northwest of the river's mouth at Ingham. The waterfall plunges from the Atherton Tableland at an elevation of 505 metres (1,657 ft) and falls between 56–75 metres (184–246 ft) into the Herbert River Gorge below.

The "tribal council" set for the second season of the American reality television show Survivor was built atop the falls in 2000 and featured on each episode.

== See also ==
- List of waterfalls
- List of waterfalls in Australia
