= Millstream Falls National Park =

National park in Queensland, Australia

- IUCN category II (national park)
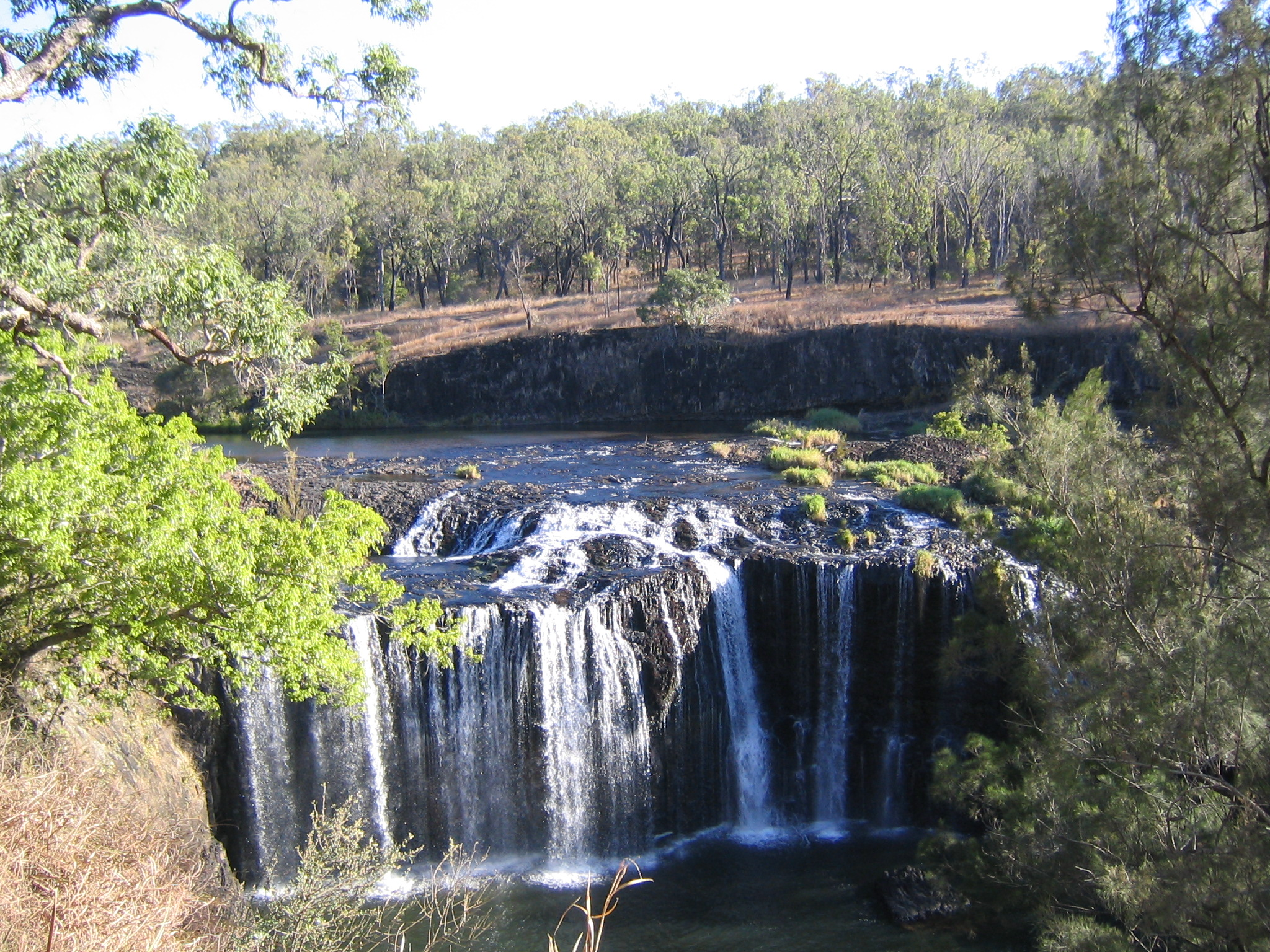
- Millstream Falls

- Location within Queensland
- Location: Queensland
- Coordinates: 17°37′0″S 145°28′32″E
- Area: 3.72 km^{2} (1.44 sq mi)
- Governing body: Queensland Parks and Wildlife Service
- Website: Official website

Millstream Falls National Park is located just west of Ravenshoe, Queensland along the Kennedy Highway in Far North Queensland, Australia, 1,341 km northwest of Brisbane. Big Millstream Falls is reputedly the widest single-drop falls in Australia. The park is small, at only 3.72 km^{2} (1.44 sq mi).

== See also ==
- Millstream Falls
- Protected areas of Queensland
