= Gudjal =

Aboriginal Australian people

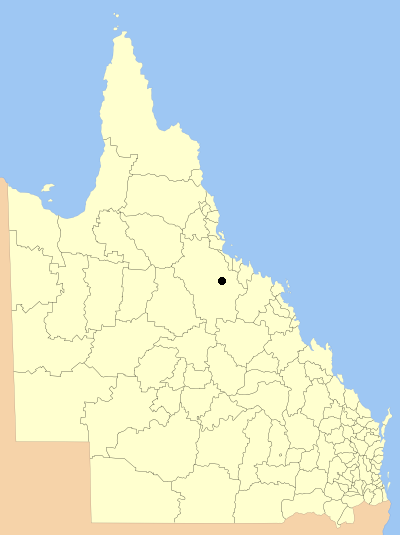
- Gudjal traditional lands

Total population
- possibly under 100 (less than 1% of the Australian population, less than 1% of the Aboriginal population)

Regions with significant populations
- Australia (Queensland)

Languages
- English, formerly Warrongo language and Gugu Badhun language

Religion
- Aboriginal mythology

The Gudjal, also known as the Kutjala, are an Indigenous Australian people of northern Queensland.

== Language ==
The Gudjal spoke a dialect of the Warrongo subgroup of Greater Maric. The materials surviving from earlier periods are not sufficient to reconstruct the language on its own, and arrangements were made, as part of a revitalization programme, to adopt terms and usages still attested for the Gugu-Badhun language.

== Country ==
Gudjal traditional lands encompassed an estimated 7,500 square miles (19,000 km^{2}) on both sides of the Great Dividing Range, taking in Mount Sturgeon, Mount Emu Plains, the Lolworth and Reedy Springs Stations. It includes the upper Clarke River. The eastern extension ran close to Charters Towers.

== History of contact ==
As colonial settlements began, with their lands been expropriated for cattle runs, the Gudjal were forced southwards towards Hughenden and Pentland.

== Art ==
The Gudjal created rock art galleries; one conspicuous example can be found in the vicinity of Charters Towers.

== Alternative names ==
- Gudjali
- Koochul-bura

== Some words ==
- younga (mother)
- wurboon (white man)
- galbin (children)

== Sources ==
- Dixon, Robert M. W. (2002). Australian Languages: Their Nature and Development. Vol. 1. Cambridge University Press. ISBN 978-0-521-47378-1.
- Hobson, John Robert (2010). Re-awakening Languages: Theory and Practice in the Revitalisation of Australia's Indigenous Languages. Sydney University Press. ISBN 978-1-920-89955-4.
- Lukin, Gresley (1886). "The Clarke River" (PDF). In Curr, Edward Micklethwaite (ed.). The Australian race: its origin, languages, customs, place of landing in Australia and the routes by which it spread itself over the continent. Vol. 2. Melbourne: J. Ferres. pp. 436–437.
- Menghetti, Diane (1984). Charters Towers (PDF) (Ph.D. thesis). James Cook University.
- Sutton, Peter (1973). Gugu-Badhun and its neighbours: A Linguistic Salvage Study (PDF) (MA thesis). Macquarie University MA.
- Tindale, Norman Barnett (1974). "Kutjala (QLD)". Aboriginal Tribes of Australia: Their Terrain, Environmental Controls, Distribution, Limits, and Proper Names. Australian National University.
