= Carl Sofus Lumholtz =

Norwegian explorer and ethnographer (1851–1922)

Carl Lumholtz
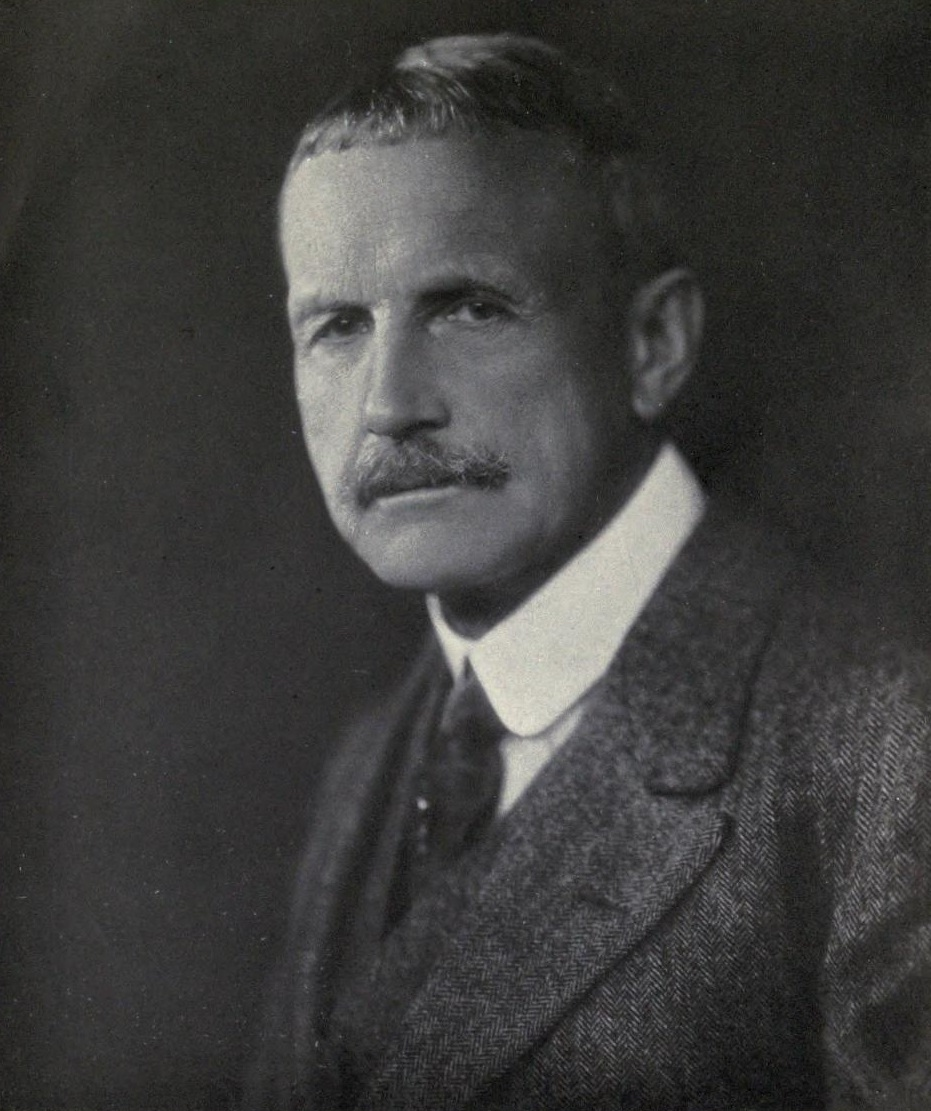
- Born: Carl Sofus Lumholtz; 23 April 1851; Faaberg, Norway
- Died: 5 May 1922 (aged 71); Saranac Lake, New York
- Citizenship: Norwegian
- Education: University of Oslo
- Scientific career
- Fields: Ethnography; Adventure

Signature
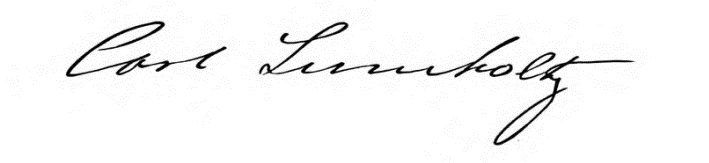

Carl Sofus Lumholtz (23 April 1851 – 5 May 1922) was a Norwegian explorer and ethnographer, best known for his meticulous field research and ethnographic publications on indigenous cultures of Australia and Mexico.

== Biography ==
Born in Faaberg, Norway, Lumholtz graduated in theology in 1876 from the Royal Frederick University, now the University of Oslo.

== Australia ==
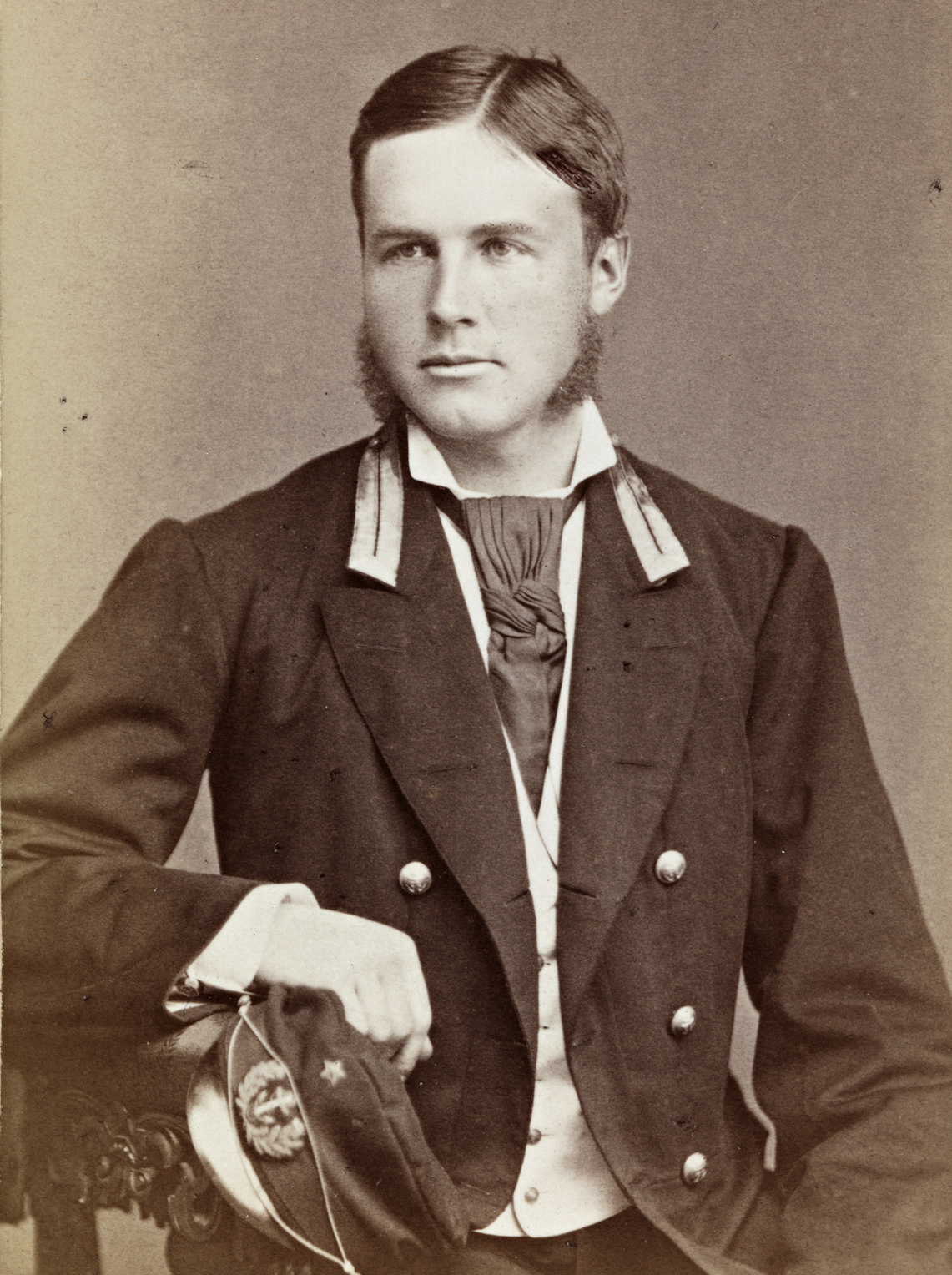
Carl Lumholtz as a Naval cadet (no date).

Lumholtz travelled to Australia in 1880, where he spent ten months from 1882 to 1883 among the Indigenous inhabitants of the Herbert-Burdekin region in North Queensland. He wrote a book about his experience, Among Cannibals: An Account of Four Years' Travels in Australia and of Camp Life with the Aborigines of Queensland, first published in 1889. According to Brayshaw, Lumholtz's work is unique in that:

"Unlike transitory or casual observers as explorers and settlers were, Lumholtz did not confine his discussion to obvious matters such as personal appearance, canoes, huts and weapons. Many other facets of life including social relationships, attitudes, the role of women and details of day to day existence came under his scrutiny."

However, Brayshaw is also critical of his work, noting that:

He never learned to speak the language, collecting only 140 words in all the time he was there... Even Lumholtz, living with the Aborigines for ten months, learnt very little."

He gave a series of two lectures on Among Australian Natives for the Lowell Institute for their 1889–90 season.

He spent four years in Queensland; his expeditions included visits to the Valley of Lagoons and the Herbert River area. He made collections of mammals while living with the local peoples, these specimens were used for the descriptions of four new species. One of these was named for the type locality, Pseudochirulus herbertensis (Herbert River Ringtail Possum), and another commemorates his name, Dendrolagus lumholtzii (Lumholtz's Tree Kangaroo).

== Mexico ==
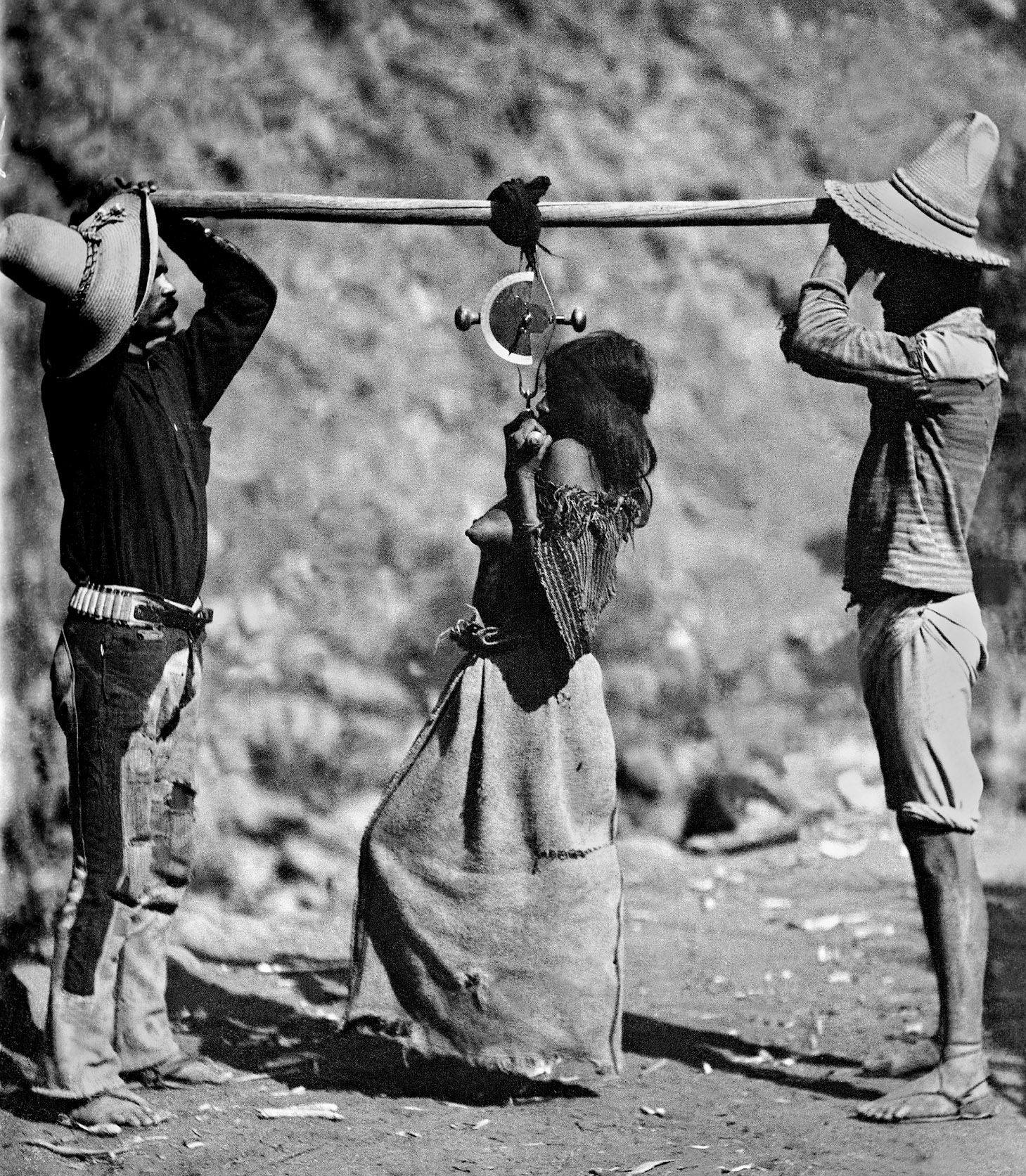
Tarahumara Woman Being Weighed, Chihuahua. 1892 photo by Carl Lumholtz.

Lumholtz later travelled to Mexico with the Swedish botanist C. V. Hartman He stayed for many years, conducting several expeditions from 1890 through to 1910 which were paid for by the American Museum of Natural History. His work, Unknown Mexico, was a 1902 two-volume set describing many of the indigenous peoples of northwestern Mexico, including the Cora, Tepehuán, Pima Bajo, and especially the Tarahumara, among whom he lived for more than a year. Lumholtz was one of the first to describe artifacts from the ancient shaft tomb and the Purépecha culture. He described archaeological sites, as well as the flora and fauna, of the northern Sierra Madre region called the gran Chichimeca. He gave a series of three lectures on "The Characteristics of Cave Dwellers of the Sierra Madre" for the Lowell Institute's 1893–94 season.

In 1905 Lumholtz was a founding member of the Explorers Club, an organization to promote exploration and scientific investigation in the field. He went on a brief expedition to India from 1914 to 1915, then to Borneo from 1915 to 1917, which was his last expedition.

Along with John Raleigh Briggs and James Mooney in the late 1800s, Lumholtz was one of the first Westerners known to have tried and described the effects of peyote. He learned of and tried peyote through his encounters with the Tarahumara and Huichol natives of Mexico. Subsequently, Lumholtz sent the German chemist Arthur Heffter peyote buttons, and Heffter successfully isolated and identified mescaline as the active constituent of peyote in 1897, publishing his findings in 1898.

== Borneo ==
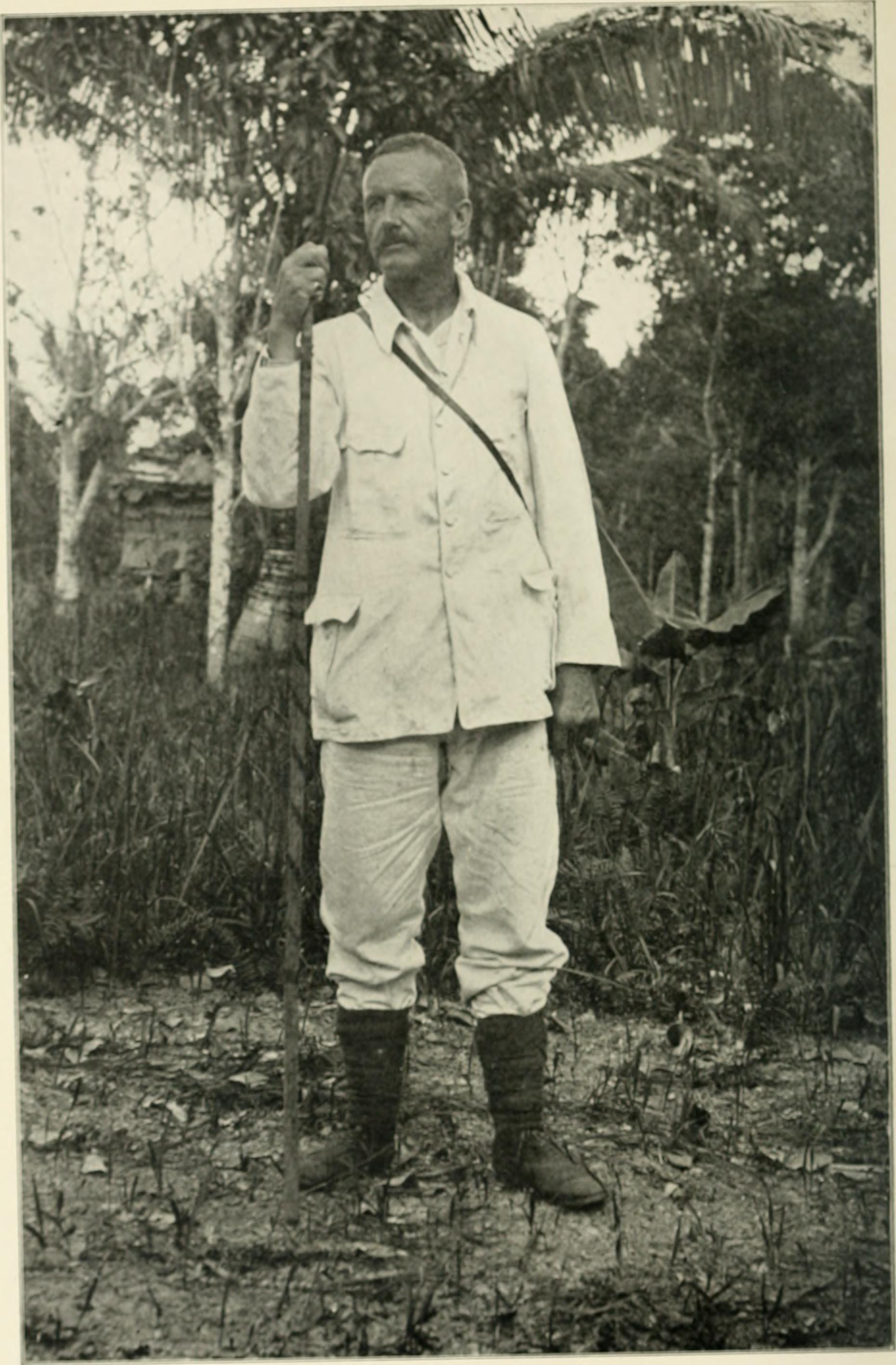
Carl Lumholtz in the Bulungan Regency, Dutch Borneo, May 1914.

Lumholtz started an expedition in 1914 to explore the mostly unknown lands of Dutch Central Borneo, currently part of Indonesia. His primary focus was to interact with the indigenous peoples to learn about their culture and habits, although he also was interested in the flora and fauna of the area.

He received numerous financial grants from geographical institutions (Norwegian Geographical Society, the Royal Geographical Society of London and the Koninklijk Nederlandsch Aardrijkskundig Genootschap), but his journey was complicated by the outbreak of the First World War which made it difficult to acquire a military escort. He originally had planned to explore New Guinea, but this was rendered impossible by the war.

He encountered two new species of flying squirrels and one new species of colugo that were native to the area. He presented his findings in 1916 in Amsterdam in a film titled Borneo Gefilmd (translated: The filming of Borneo) which was about 40 minutes long.

In this expedition Lumholtz encountered several different tribes of indigenous people. One of them was the Dayak people, which not only are masters of woodcutting but also show tremendous fortitude when in battle with crocodiles, according to Lumholtz. They also played an important part in Lumholtz's expedition, by making camps and snares for catching wildlife, and carrying supplies for him. (Dayaks has been considered a collective term for the native people of Borneo.)

Another people Lumholtz encountered were the Punan. When Lumholtz visited the Punan, they had already discontinued the practice of head-hunting and were now a peaceful and harmless people, according to Lumholtz. He also stated that the Punan had probably copied this custom from the Dayaks.

Lumholtz wrote on his experiences in Borneo in his book, Through Central Borneo; an account of two years' travel in the land of the head-hunters between the years 1913 and 1917, published in 1920.

== Later life ==
In 1922 Lumholtz died of tuberculosis at Saranac Lake, New York, where he was seeking treatment at a sanatorium. He had published six books on his discoveries, as well as the autobiography My Life of Exploration (1921).

== Legacy and honors ==
His greatest legacy was his books and his way of working, which strongly influenced the field of ethnography.

- The Lumholtz National Park of North Queensland was named in his honor when created in 1994. However, the name was subsequently changed to Girringun National Park in 2003 to reflect its indigenous roots.
- The Mexican conifer Pinus lumholtzii, Lumholtz's pine, was named after him.
- The marsupial species Lumholtz's tree-kangaroo (Dendrolagus lumholtzi) was named after him.
- The snake species Calamaria lumholtzi was named after him.

== Works ==
An incomplete list of works:

- Among Cannibals; an account of four years' travels in Australia and of camp life with the aborigines of Queensland (1889).
- Unknown Mexico; a record of five years' exploration among the tribes of the western Sierra Madre; in the tierra caliente of Tepic and Jalisco; and among the Tarascos of Michoacan (1902).
- Through Central Borneo; an account of two years' travel in the land of the head-hunters between the years 1913 and 1917 (1920).
- My life of exploration (1921).
