= Wallaman Falls =

Waterfall on Stony Creek in Queensland, Australia

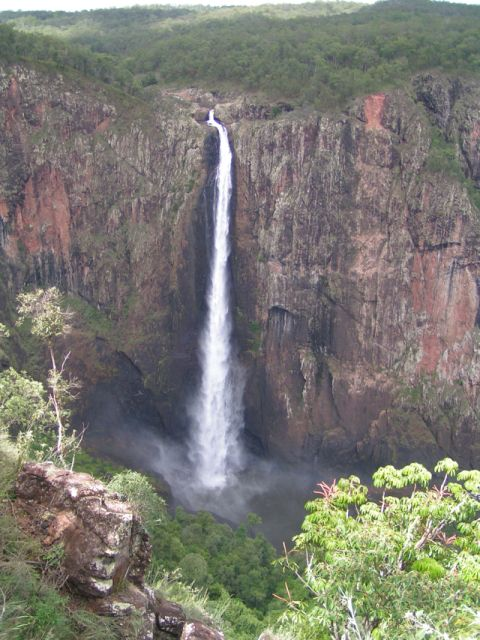
- Wallaman Falls in Girringun National Park

- Location within Queensland
- Location: North Queensland, Australia
- Coordinates: 18°35′32″S 145°48′05″E
- Type: Cascade, horsetail
- Elevation: 533–554 m (1,749–1,818 ft)
- Total height: 305 m (1,001 ft)
- Number of drops: 2
- Longest drop: 268 m (879 ft)
- Total width: 15 m (49 ft)
- Average width: 15 m (49 ft)
- Watercourse: Stony Creek
- Average flow rate: 3 m^{3}/s (110 cu ft/s)
- World height ranking: 294

The Wallaman Falls, a cascade and horsetail waterfall on the Stony Creek, is located in the UNESCO World Heritage-listed Wet Tropics in the locality of Wallaman, Shire of Hinchinbrook in the northern region of Queensland, Australia. The waterfall is notable for its main drop of 268 metres (879 ft), which makes it the country's tallest single-drop waterfall. The pool at the bottom of the waterfall is 20 metres (66 ft) deep. An estimated 100,000 people visit the waterfall annually.

== Location and features ==
The waterfall is situated in the Girringun National Park as it descends from the Atherton Tableland, where the Stony Creek, a tributary of the Herbert River, flows over an escarpment in the Seaview Range. The falls initially descend over a small number of cascades before the 268-metre (879 ft) horsetail drop. In total, the falls descend over 305 metres (1,001 ft). Based on the falls' single-drop descent, the World Waterfall Database places Wallaman Falls at 294 in its world rankings.

The geological history of the formation may be traced back some 50 million years, when the uplift of the continental margin in the region created modern landforms. The Herbert River, which previously flowed west, began to cut through the terrain en route to its outflow in the Coral Sea. The gorge produced by this erosive action gradually retreated inland along the Herbert River's course at a rate of 40 centimetres (16 in) per hundred years. The river's tributaries were eventually left suspended by this action, forming their own gorges.

== See also ==
- List of waterfalls
- List of waterfalls of Queensland
