= Millstream Falls =

Millstream Falls Yindinji
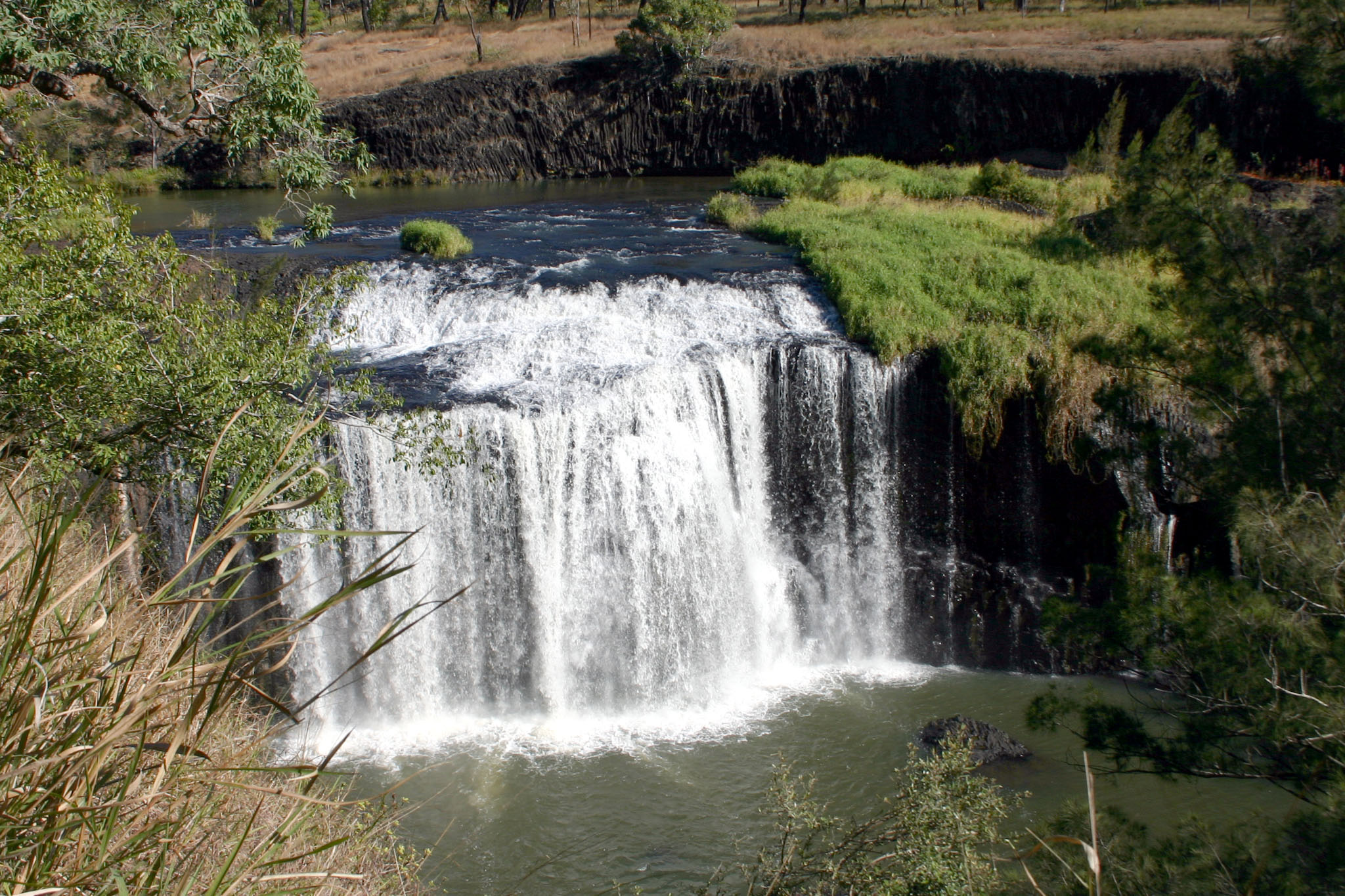
- Millstream Falls

- Location within Queensland
- Location: Far North Queensland, Australia
- Coordinates: 17°38′00″S 145°23′00″E
- Type: Tiered plunge
- Watercourse: The Millstream

The Millstream Falls (Aboriginal: Yindinji), a tiered plunge waterfall on The Millstream, is located in the UNESCO World Heritage–listed Wet Tropics in the Far North region of Queensland, Australia.

== Location and features ==
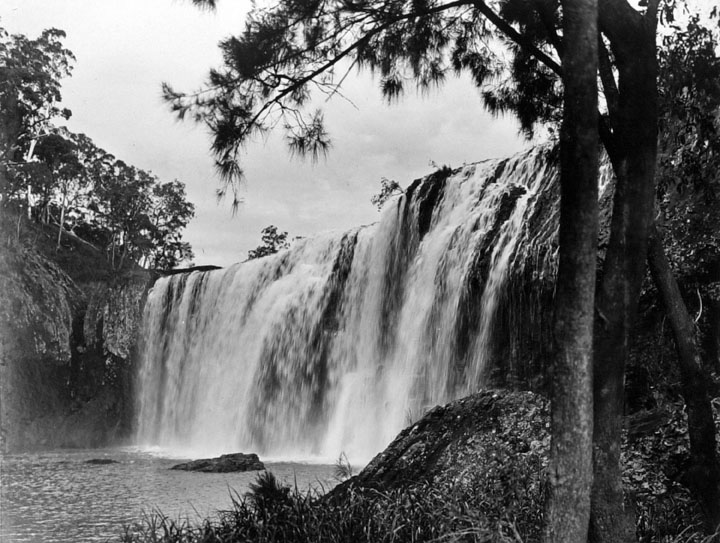
Millstream Falls, 1935.

The Millstream Falls are situated approximately 15 kilometres (9.3 mi) southwest of Ravenshoe, on the Atherton Tableland and are accessible by road from the Kennedy Highway. The falls are protected within the Millstream Falls National Park. Big Millstream falls are a height of [27.23m] and Little Millstream falls are a height of [15.45m]

The falls comprise two sets of falls, Big Millstream Falls and Little Millstream Falls, both located on the same watercourse, situated approximately 500 metres (1,600 ft) apart. The larger of the two falls is reputably the widest single-drop waterfall in Australia.

== See also ==
- List of waterfalls
- List of waterfalls in Australia
