= Girringun National Park =

National park in Queensland, Australia

- Location within Queensland
- Location: Queensland
- Nearest city: Ingham
- Coordinates: 18°05′00″S 145°35′36″E
- Area: 1,538 km^{2} (594 sq mi)
- Established: 1994
- Governing body: Queensland Parks and Wildlife Service
- Website: Official website

Girringun National Park is a national park in Queensland, Australia, approximately 50 kilometres (31 mi) southwest of Ingham, 110 kilometres (68 mi) north of Townsville and 1,290 kilometres (800 mi) northwest of Brisbane. The park is one of the Wet Tropics World Heritage Area series of national parks, and is a gazetted World Heritage Site.

== History ==
The park was originally named the Lumholtz National Park, after scientist Carl Sofus Lumholtz, when it was created in 1994. The Blencoe Falls Section was gazetted as part of Lumholtz National Park in 2000. The name was subsequently changed to Girringun in 2003. On National Parks Day 2010 (28 March) the Government of Queensland announced the addition of 2,810 hectares (6,900 acres) to the park.

== Environment ==
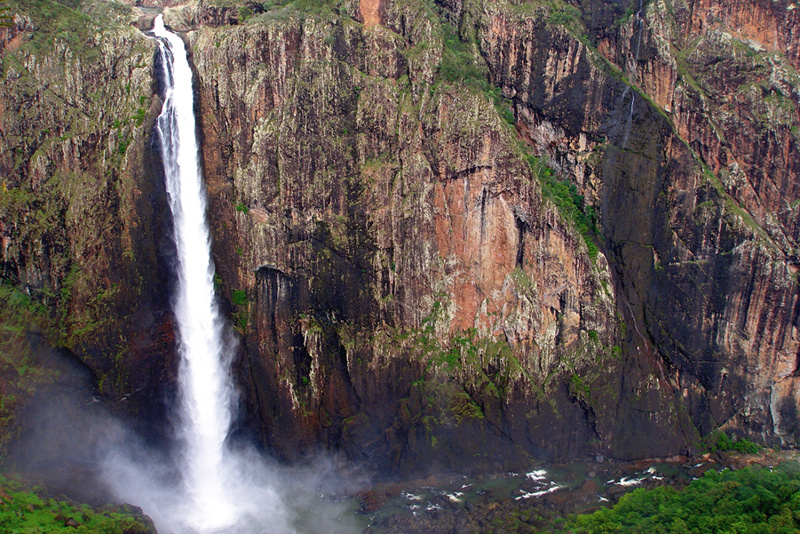
Wallaman Falls

This large national park consists mainly of wet sclerophyll forests, but small pockets of rainforest also exist along the eastern slopes and hilltops. The Seaview, George and Cardwell ranges dominate the landscape, which is strewn with granite debris from a volcanic eruption 100,000 years ago. Perhaps the most well known geological feature in this park is the Wallaman Falls. At 268 metres (879 ft) it is the largest single-drop falls in Australia. The park forms part of the Wooroonooran Important Bird Area, identified as such by BirdLife International because it supports populations of a range of bird species endemic to Queensland's Wet Tropics.

== Access and infrastructure ==
Vehicle access into the forest include the Dalrymple Gap Track, or the Wallaman Falls track. However, for most of the park there is only very rudimentary or absent vehicle access. Most of the park is accessible for hikers, but due to its remoteness and rugged terrain only experienced bushwalkers should undertake extensive hikes.

== See also ==
- Herbert River Falls
- Protected areas of Queensland
