= Alf Palmer =

Last known speaker of Warrungu

- Jinbilnggay
- Alf Palmer on Palm Island in July 1972
- Born: c. 1891
- Died: 1981
- Other name: Jinbilnggay
- Known for: Being the last native speaker of Warrungu

Alf Palmer (c. 1891–1981), or Jinbilnggay in the Warrongo language, was the last native speaker of the Australian aboriginal language Warrongo. He lived in Townsville, Queensland, Australia.

He worked together with linguists Drs. Tasaku Tsunoda from Japan and Peter Sutton from Sydney, Australia, to preserve his language. He was anxious for his language to be preserved and repeatedly told Tsunoda, "I'm the last one to speak Warrungu. When I die, this language will die. I'll teach you everything I know, so put it down properly."
