= Tasaku Tsunoda =

Japanese linguist

Tsunoda Tasaku (角田 太作; born 1946) is a Japanese linguist, specializing in Australian Aboriginal languages. His interests embrace linguistic typology and endangered languages.

== Career ==
Tsunoda was born in Akagi, Gumma Prefecture (now incorporated with other villages and renamed Shibukawa) in 1946. On graduating from Tokyo University, Tsunoda moved to Monash University in Melbourne where he completed a master's and then a doctoral degree in linguistics. His choice of Melbourne for postgraduate work was partially influenced by the fact that the Monash campus was close to an athletic training camp run by the former world middle distance champion Herb Elliott. His supervisor for both his M.A. and PhD was Barry Blake.

Beginning in 1972, Tsunoda undertook fieldwork on Palm Island in Queensland for his master's thesis (1974), where he undertook extensive interviews with a native informant, Alf Palmer (1891–1981), who happened to be the last fluent speaker of Warrungu, an Aboriginal language originally spoken in the upper reaches of the Herbert River, west of Tully He later wrote up his research to produce the standard grammar of the language, published in 2012. The language is important for being one of less than ten languages in the world, uniquely found in Northern Queensland, that embody the phenomenon of syntactic ergativity. On Palmer's death, Tsunoda, a Japanese, became the last speaker of the all but extinct Australian language, Warrungu.

Subsequently, Tsunoda pursued field work in the southern Kimberley region of Western Australia, where he mastered and wrote a grammar of Djaru.

On retirement from Tokyo University, he joined the National Institute for Japanese Language and Linguistics. He has returned on occasion to Palm Island as a guest of the Australian Literacy & Numeracy Foundation in order to help children learn some Warrungu and assist in attempts to revive the language. He has provided the community with translations of classic children's books such as The Very Hungry Caterpillar, and Worrongo tales.

== Publications ==
- (1981) The Djaru Language of Kimberley, Western Australia, Canberra: Pacific Linguistics.
- (1991)『世界の言語と日本語』くろしお出版。
- (2005) Endangerment and Language Revitalization: An Introduction, Berlin/New York: Mouton de Gruyter.
- (2012) A Grammar of Worongo, Berlin/New York: Mouton de Gruyter.

== Notes and references ==
=== References ===
- Dixon, Robert M. W. (1981). "Wargamay". In Dixon, Robert M. W.; Blake, Barry J. (eds.). Handbook of Australian Languages. Vol. 2. John Benjamins Publishing. pp. 1–145. ISBN 978-9-027-22004-2.
- Schwarten, Evan (12 September 2011). "Linguist revives lost Aboriginal language". The Australian. Archived from the original on September 12, 2011.
- Tsunoda, Tasaku (1981). The Djaru language of Kimberley, Western Australia. Research School of Pacific Studies. ISBN 978-0-858-83252-7.
- Tsunoda, Tasaku (2012). A Grammar of Worrongo. Walter de Gruyter. ISBN 978-3-110-23877-8.
