= Blencoe Falls =

Waterfall in Far North Queensland

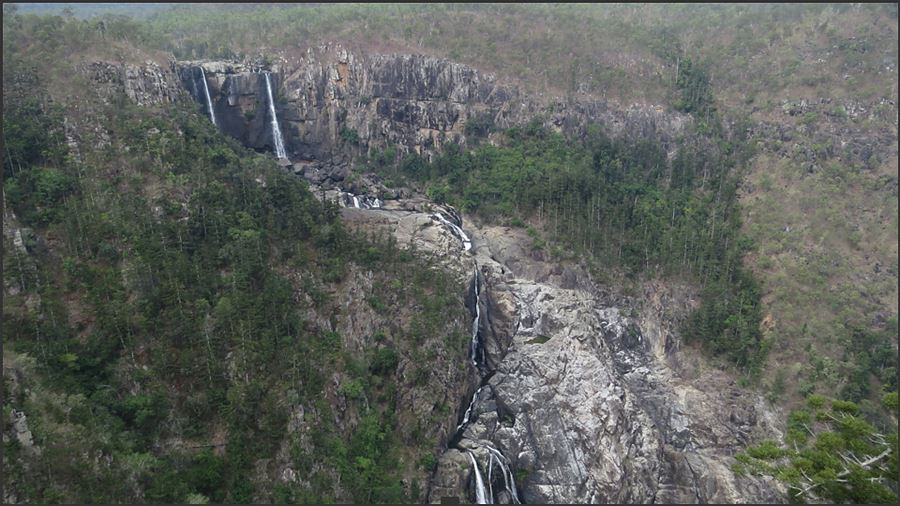
- Blencoe Falls, 2022

- Location within Queensland
- Location: Far North, Queensland, Australia
- Coordinates: 18°13′27″S 145°32′23″E
- Type: Segmented
- Elevation: 517 metres (1,696 ft) AHD
- Total height: 320 metres (1,050 ft)
- Number of drops: 2
- Longest drop: 230 metres (750 ft)
- Watercourse: Blencoe Creek

The Blencoe Falls is a segmented waterfall on the Blencoe Creek, located in Kirrama, Tablelands Region, in Far North Queensland, Australia.

== Etymology ==
Blencoe Falls and the adjacent Blencoe Creek were named during an 1866 expedition from Cardwell across the Great Dividing Range. The features were named after expedition member Robert William Archdale Blencowe (1833–1866). Blencowe died shortly after the expedition from colonial fever in Ipswich on 1 November 1866.

== Location and features ==
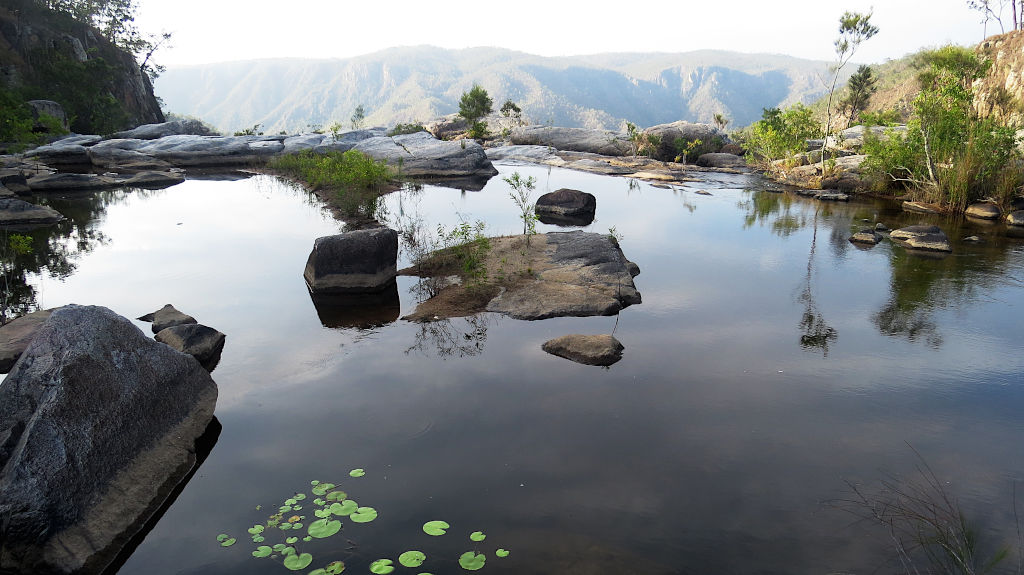
Pool at the top of the falls, 2022

The falls are situated in the Girringun National Park approximately 2 kilometres (1.2 mi) north of a confluence with the Blencoe Creek and the Herbert River. From an elevation of 517 metres (1,696 ft) above sea level, the falls descend 320 metres (1,050 ft) in an initial drop of approximately 90 metres (300 ft) and then cascade for another 230 metres (750 ft) to the base of the gorge.

The falls can be reached by unsealed road from Mount Garnet on the Kennedy Highway. The unsealed Kirrama Range Road from Kennedy on the Bruce Highway also provides access from the coast to the falls. Access should only be attempted in dry conditions. Flooding can occur in the wetter months of December to April. Four-wheel-drive vehicles are recommended. Blencoe Falls lookout is approximately 62 kilometres (39 mi) west of Kennedy.

The traditional custodians of the land surrounding the Blencoe Falls are the Indigenous Australian Warrongo people, some of whom were driven over the ridges above Blencoe Falls to drown in the gorge.

The second season of Survivor was filmed in an area close to the falls.

== See also ==
- List of waterfalls
- List of waterfalls in Australia
