= Herbert River =

River in Far North Queensland

Herbert
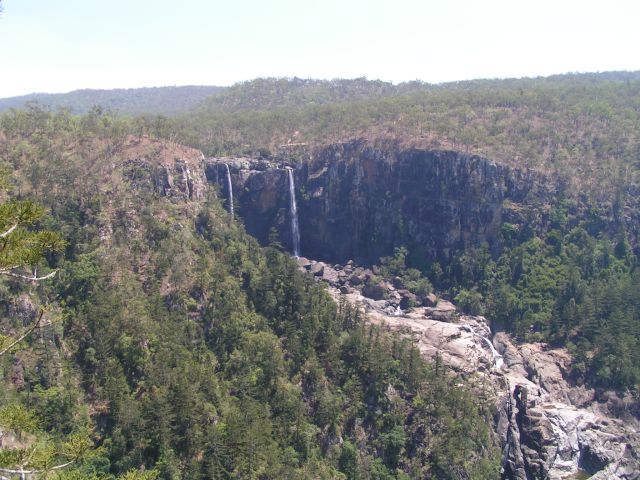
- Blencoe Creek flowing over Blencoe Falls into the Herbert River gorge, 2006

- Location of Herbert River river mouth in Queensland
- Etymology: Robert Herbert

Location
- Country: Australia
- State: Queensland
- Region: Far North Queensland, Wet Tropics of Queensland
- City: Ingham

Physical characteristics
- Source: Atherton Tableland, Great Dividing Range
- Source confluence: Millstream and Wild River
  - coordinates: 17°41′50″S 145°15′49″E
  - elevation: 642 m (2,106 ft)
- Mouth: Coral Sea
  - location: Hinchinbrook Channel
  - coordinates: 18°32′16″S 146°17′21″E
  - elevation: 0 m (0 ft)
- Length: 288 km (179 mi)
- Basin size: 10,130 km^{2} (3,910 sq mi)
- Discharge
  - location: Near mouth
  - average: 4,330,000 ML/a (137 m^{3}/s)

Basin features
- Tributaries
  - left: Blunder Creek, Sunday Creek (Queensland), Cameron Creek (Queensland), Blencoe Creek, Smoko Creek, Yamanie Creek, Gowrie Creek, Elphinstone Creek
  - right: Battle Creek (Queensland), Nettle Creek (Queensland), Nanyeta (Return) Creek, Rudd Creek, Flaggy Creek, Stony Creek (Queensland), Stone River
- Waterfalls: Herbert River Falls, Blencoe Falls, Millstream Falls

The Herbert River is a river in Far North Queensland, Australia. The southernmost of Queensland's wet tropics river systems, it was named in 1864 by George Elphinstone Dalrymple explorer, after Robert George Wyndham Herbert, the first Premier of Queensland.

== Location and features ==
With its headwaters forming at an elevation of 1,070 metres (3,510 ft) on the Atherton Tableland, part of the Great Dividing Range west of Herberton and north of Ravenshoe, the Herbert River is formed by the confluence of the Millstream and the Wild River. The Herbert River flows in a generally southeastern direction through the Lumholtz National Park joined by fifteen tributaries including the Stone River and flowing past the town of Ingham. The Herbert River reaches its mouth where it enters the Coral Sea near Lucinda, at the southern end of the Hinchinbrook Channel, 130 kilometres (81 mi) north of Townsville. The river descends 642 metres (2,106 ft) over its 288-kilometre (179 mi) course.

The Herbert River tributaries include the Blunder, Sunday and Cameron Creeks, which all rise in the Cardwell Range and drain the northern portion of the river's catchment area, upstream of the Herbert River Falls. Further south the catchment is drained by the Nanyeta (Return) and Rudd Creeks, which flow out of the Great Dividing Range west of Mount Garnet and from the Forty Mile Scrub area. In total, the river has a catchment of 10,130 square kilometres (3,910 sq mi).

The Wallaman Falls on Stony Creek, another tributary of the Herbert, are Australia's tallest single-drop waterfall. Other waterfalls on the river include Herbert River Falls, Blencoe Falls and Millstream Falls.

Heavy rainfall causes the river level and speed of flow to rise very quickly, especially in the lower flood plain areas around Ingham where rainfall of up to 600 millimetres (24 in) over a few days may occur during peak wet season. Floodwater up to depths of 3 metres (9.8 ft) above ground level occurs in low parts of the town, requiring the evacuation of residents and their property from low-lying areas. The river experienced significant flooding during the 2010–11 Queensland floods.

== People and land use ==
Warrgamay (also known as Waragamai, Wargamay, Wargamaygan, Biyay, and Warakamai) is an Australian Aboriginal language in North Queensland. The language region includes the Herbert River area, Ingham, Hawkins Creek, Long Pocket, Herbert Vale, Niagara Vale, Yamanic Creek, Herbert Gorge, Cardwell, Hinchinbrook Island and the adjacent mainland.

Warungu (also known as Warrungu, Warrongo, and Waroongoo.) is an Australian Aboriginal language in North Queensland. The language region includes areas from the Upper Herbert River to Mount Garnet.

The catchment area holds a population of about 18,000, 75% of whom dwell in the lower flood plain area.

The river's upper region is used mainly for cattle grazing, while the lower Herbert River floodplain is given over to sugar cane production. The middle reaches of the catchment include National Parks, State Forests and sections of the Wet Tropics World Heritage Area.

Parts of the river, especially the Herbert River Gorge stretch, are used for kayaking and white water rafting. The Herbert River is one of Australia's two finest extended whitewater journeys, the other the Franklin River in Tasmania.

The second season of the U.S. reality television series, Survivor, was filmed on the "Goshen" cattle station in the upper Herbert River region, near the Blencoe Falls and Herbert River Gorge.

The Herbert, together with the Tully and the Burdekin rivers, were part of the proposed Bradfield Scheme to divert the upper reaches of the three rivers west of the Great Dividing Range and into the Thomson River designed to irrigate and drought-proof much of the western Queensland interior, as well as large areas of South Australia. The Scheme was proposed in 1938 and abandoned in 1947.

== See also ==
- List of rivers of Australia § Queensland
