= Mareeba Uniting Church =

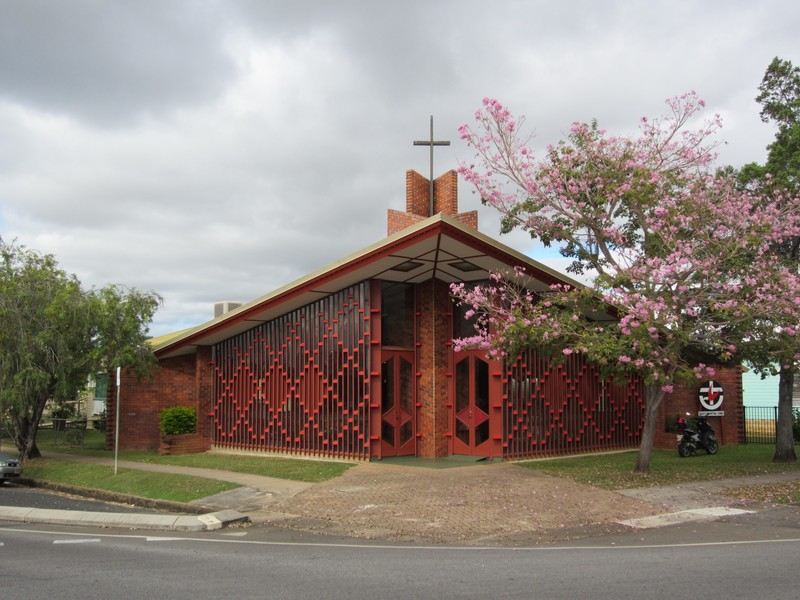
- Front of church from the street, 2012

- Location within Queensland
- 16.9974°S 145.4246°E
- Location: 189 Walsh Street (cnr Rankin Street), Mareeba, Shire of Mareeba, Queensland, Australia

History
- Design period: 1940s–1960s (Post-WWII)
- Built: 1960

Site notes
- Architect: Eddie Oribin

Queensland Heritage Register
- Official name: Mareeba Uniting Church (former)
- Type: state heritage
- Designated: 25 June 2021
- Reference no.: 602643
- Type: Religion/worship: Church
- Theme: Creating social and cultural institutions: Worshipping and religious institutions
- Builders: L. Tinslee

Mareeba Uniting Church is a heritage-listed former church at 189 Walsh Street (corner of Rankin Street), Mareeba, Shire of Mareeba, Queensland, Australia. It was designed by Eddie Oribin and built in 1960 by L. Tinslee. It was originally Mareeba Methodist Church. It was added to the Queensland Heritage Register on 25 June 2021.

== History ==
The former Mareeba Uniting Church was built in the town of Mareeba on the Atherton Tableland in 1960 and is one of a series of innovative buildings designed by Queensland architect Edwin Henry (Eddie) Oribin (1927–2016). Originally established as Mareeba Methodist Church, it was built during a period of Christian modernisation and growth, and served as its congregation's place of worship from its dedication in August 1960 until January 2021.

The Atherton Tablelands, west of Cairns in Far North Queensland, was named after squatter John Atherton, who was the first person to establish a cattle run in the area in the late 1870s. In the 1880s, the Atherton family established a wayside inn and store at the crossing of Granite Creek, supplying goods to traffic passing between Port Douglas to the north and the new tin mining township of Herberton to the south. A settlement developed on the southern side of Granite Creek, on the traditional lands of the Muluridgi people, and was surveyed by E. B. Rankin as the town of Mareeba in 1891. In 1893, it became a railhead when the Cairns-to-Kuranda railway line was extended, and by 1919 Mareeba was the district's most important town. Owing its prosperity to a diverse agricultural economy, post-World War II (WWII) Mareeba grew to become the largest tobacco-growing centre in Australia, and in 1954 the town's population reached 3,369.

The earliest church services in Mareeba were conducted by visiting clergymen in the 1890s, from temporary premises such as the Mareeba State School (completed in 1893). The first church built in Mareeba was a United Protestant Church, constructed in 1896 on Walsh Street and shared by the Methodist and Presbyterian congregations for more than 60 years. In 1954, the combined population of Methodists and Presbyterians in Mareeba was 752, of which just over half (388) identified as Methodist.

Methodism arose as a group movement within the Church of England in the early 18th century during the industrial and agrarian revolutions. It spread rapidly throughout the United States of America in the late 18th and early 19th centuries through itinerant preachers and later throughout the world through Methodist missionaries. The term "Methodism" arose from the methodical way the Christian faith was approached and included an emphasis on preaching, evangelism, a love for singing, and social activism.

The 1950s were a period of substantial change and reform within the Methodist and other Christian denominations throughout Australia, as they sought to become more relevant to modern society. Developments in theology and liturgy, coupled with an expansionary building program, led to a radical departure from established architectural traditions. Reflecting international trends, church designs moved away from historical revival styles and became increasingly influenced by Modernism. However, it was expected that a church would still be recognisable as such, resulting in a wide range of variations combining traditional church elements, symbols, and functions with new construction techniques, materials, and forms. A new flexibility in the spatial organisation of modern churches resulted in an immense variety of plan arrangements that broke away from the traditional cruciform or rectangular plan. These altered church interiors reflected the community celebration of worship, without distance between clergy and people.

Many new Methodist churches, Sunday school halls, and parsonages were constructed throughout Queensland in the 1950s, replacing older buildings and meeting demand in new suburbs and growing regions. In addition, the church constructed new buildings to support its various charities and organisations including aged-persons homes, hostels, Young People's Department (YPD) Camps, and Kings College (opened 1955) at the St Lucia campus of University of Queensland.

Methodist optimism in the post-WWII period was demonstrated in "a series of nationalistic [sic] evangelistic campaigns, which climaxed in the "Mission to the Nation"". Carried out between 1953 and 1957, the Mission was the largest attempt ever made by the Methodist Church to reform the nation, emphasising the Christian faith as the only answer to social and industrial problems. Meetings were held in capital cities and main provincial centres throughout the country, conducted by campaign leader Reverend Alan Walker. Attracting large crowds, the crusade received wide newspaper and radio coverage. During his Queensland tour in 1954, Rev. Walker visited the Atherton Tableland on Sunday 4 July, where a massed service was held in Atherton in Merriland Hall, a WWII igloo.

After this event, the decision was made to progress with building a separate Methodist Church at Mareeba. The minutes of the Mareeba Circuit quarterly meetings note that in October 1954 a letter from the Northern Commission requested that steps be taken towards the building of a Methodist Church in Mareeba as soon as possible. To help finance the construction of new buildings, the Methodists arranged to sell their half of the United Church property to the Presbyterian Church for £2300, which was paid by the Mareeba Presbyterian Church in early 1957. Donations and legacies from parishioners also contributed to the church building fund.

A memorial fund was established in July 1958 for the proposed new church and by October that year, more than £508 had been raised for this purpose. Utilitarian war memorials in post-WWII were popular and many public buildings, including memorial churches, were funded with the assistance of the Commonwealth government's tax deduction scheme for donations to war memorial funds. In the case of the Mareeba Uniting Church, the memorial was an incorporated tower, rather than the whole building.

The site for the proposed new Methodist church was on the corner of Walsh and Rankin streets, towards the southern end of town. The church had purchased two lots there in 1940 as the site for a manse, which was completed in early 1941. In 1942, the church purchased a third adjacent lot to the south. In preparation for relocating to the new site, a church hall was constructed on this lot in 1956–57, leaving the corner of the property vacant. Over the next few years, fundraising continued and Cairns-based architect E H Oribin was engaged to design the new church.

Edwin Henry (Eddie) Oribin was born in Cairns in 1927. As a teenager during WWII, he lived in Brisbane, where he obtained work with the Allison Aircraft Division of General Motors, rebuilding aircraft engines at Breakfast Creek in an early example of an Emil Brizay-designed igloo (demolished). Returning to Cairns in 1944, Oribin commenced architectural training with Sidney George Barnes, Chief Architect of the Allied Works Council for North Queensland, whose training gave Oribin a solid grounding in structural design and construction. In 1950, Oribin moved to Brisbane to work and study, and on 10 February 1953 he obtained his registration as an architect in Queensland, returning to Cairns the following month to begin a partnership with Barnes. This partnership lasted until Barnes' death in 1959, after which Oribin continued on his own until 1973 when he closed his full-time practice. Afterwards, Oribin engaged in other design projects and designed his own homes, which were all located outside north Queensland. Oribin died in 2016.

Oribin undertook a wide range of work in north Queensland between 1953 and 1978. Oribin closed his full-time practice in 1973, but undertook some design projects prior to leaving far north Queensland in 1979. Throughout his career, he was devoted to experimenting with different structural and aesthetic ideas, drawing inspiration from a wide variety of Australian and international publications. Characteristics of Oribin's work included meticulous detailing, structural creativity, and concern for the modulation of light. He was also known for his model-making skills and superb craftsmanship, often creating objects himself.

During the 1950s, Barnes and Oribin were well known architects in Cairns and the Atherton Tableland as well as further afield, receiving numerous commissions for a range of small and medium scale projects, such as fire stations, shops, and hospital facilities. In 1956, Oribin designed the Mareeba Shire Hall which was constructed at a nearby site in Walsh Street in 1960–61.

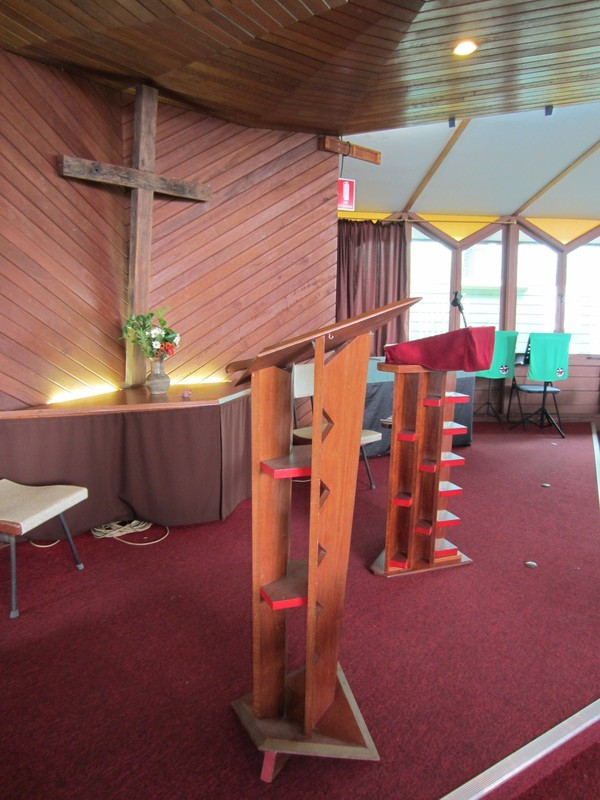
Chancel and original furniture, 2012

By December 1959, plans for the Mareeba church were completed. To be constructed primarily from brick and timber, the design had a square floor plan with its main entrance at the corner facing the intersection, full-height glass front walls with timber fins, and a brick tower. The interior was laid out on the diagonal, with the chancel and a small vestry in the southeast corner. This arrangement allowed the congregation to fan outwards around the altar, and was a type that had been successfully employed in Europe in the 1950s. The choice of a square plan for the Mareeba Methodist Church took advantage of both the remaining space available on the site and its corner position.

The contractor employed was Les Tinsley, a local builder who had worked with Oribin previously, having just constructed Paul's Anglican Church at Proserpine in 1959. A ceremony for the laying of the foundation stone was held on Saturday 2 April 1960, attended by Methodist church representatives from the Northern District. The stone was set by senior circuit steward Mr Andy Smith and an address delivered by the Reverend R W Moreton (of Cairns). During the ceremony, an inscribed silver trowel was presented to Smith by Oribin.

The church was completed within five months and was dedicated by the president of the Methodist Conference, Rev. Cyril A Read, on 6 August. It cost £9000. The tower was dedicated as a memorial to those who had served in World Wars I and II, with a small continuously lit red lamp intended to signify the people's remembrance. A wayside pulpit was added south of the building soon after the church's opening, using funds raised on that day.

The unique design of the church attracted attention from both the Methodist and wider community. Articles about the building appeared in the Methodist Times, and the architectural journal Building Ideas, while an article in The Courier-Mail about modern churches, described it as "one of the most unusual design[s] with its sloping, wedge-shaped roof and louvred grill". Two years after its completion, a Tablelands Advertiser article described the church as already a landmark in the district. The church was also photographed during the 1960s by noted architectural photographers Richard Stringer (1968) and Peter Wille (c. 1960). Oribin was named as an innovative architect in a study of significant 20th century building in 1988 and the building has since featured in articles and architectural theses.

The Mareeba Methodist Church was the second completed of three unique churches designed by Oribin in the late 1950s, the others being St Paul's Anglican Memorial Church, Proserpine (1959, and St Andrew's Presbyterian Memorial Church, Innisfail (1961). Each of these churches is distinctive in design, having directly responded to the needs of the clients, and experimented with construction and design ideas. The Mareeba Methodist Church illustrates Oribin's use of angular motifs, similar to St Andrew's Church in Innisfail, Oribin's first house (1958) and his Oribin Studio (1960) in Cairns.

Oribin was particularly influenced by the mid-20th century work of American architect and designer Frank Lloyd Wright (1867–1959), particularly Wright's "organic" architecture. Like Wright, Oribin's architecture follows organic principles. His buildings are compatible with their environments, closely integrated with the site, and have regard for the processes of nature and the forms they produce. Oribin's buildings use local materials, respond to the topography and climate to produce comfortable conditions, and have highly organised layouts. Oribin's first house was included in a 1969 journal article, which detailed organic architecture and its wide variety of forms, materials, and interpretations employed by Australian architects, with features such as clearly expressed timber structure, textured brickwork, free massing, and complex geometries that complemented natural elements of their site.

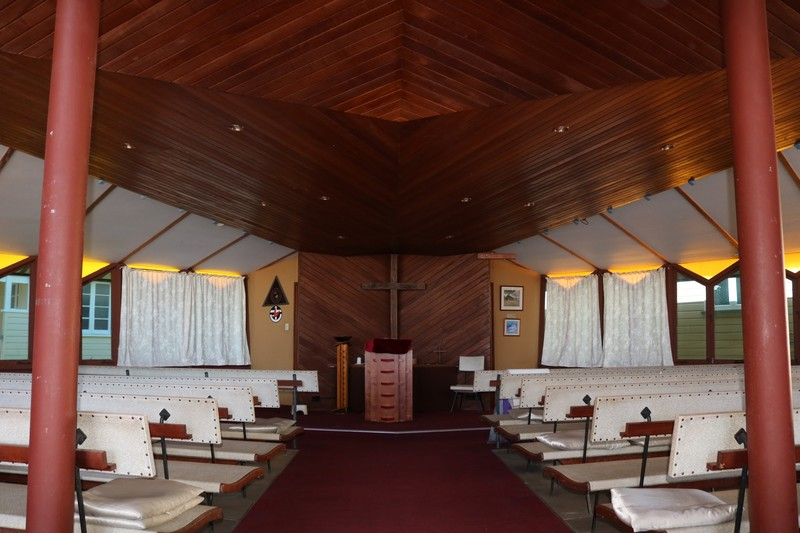
Looking from the nave to the chancel, 2021

The Mareeba Methodist Church design shares many similarities to the Oribin Studio in Cairns (designed during the same year), which emulates the form and structure of one of Wright's most important American works, the Unitarian Meeting House (1947–51) in Wisconsin, USA. Some of the studio's features, such as the peaked gable roof form and angled timber side walls with triangular fanlights over casement windows, were reused and adapted by Oribin to suit the site and scale of the church.

The church used ordinary materials in a highly creative way. Brick walls anchor the corners of the large angled roof, which is pierced by the brick tower. The timber and glass front screen walls incorporated operable ventilation panels and their repeated patterns cast a changing dappled light effect on the interior during the day and made an impressive display of the church when illuminated at night. "Natural" finishes, which emphasised the inherent beauty of the base building materials, were used throughout. A contrast between light and dark materials was used for dramatic effect on the interior, where a central lower ceiling of stained and clear-finished timber boards appeared to hover over the seated congregation and formed a background wall to the chancel and its large cross. Triangle and diamond motifs were used for ornamentation.

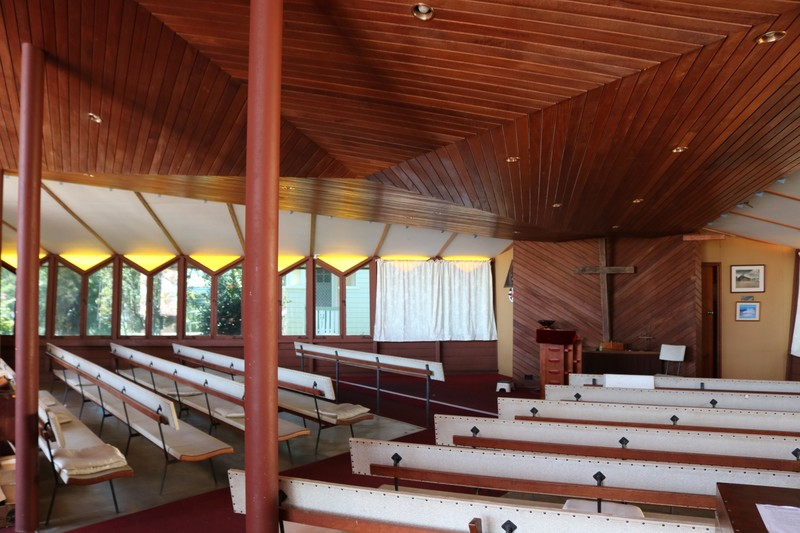
Looking across the nave towards the chancel, 2021

Designed to seat 200 people, the pews (custom-designed by Oribin) were laid out so that the congregation was grouped around the preacher, the furthest seat being only 9 metres (30 ft) from the pulpit. Original plans show that a 2.8-metre (9 ft 2 in) high screen was to divide the entrance lobby from the church; however, no evidence of it having been built was found. The church furniture, both fixed and movable (pews, removable communion rails, pulpit/lectern, stand for baptism font, moveable plant pots), was designed by Oribin to reflect the overall design of the church, with sharp angles and triangular ornamentation.

The Mareeba church design includes triangular garden beds projecting from the brick ends of the front elevations. Oribin also designed movable timber plant pots for the church interior.

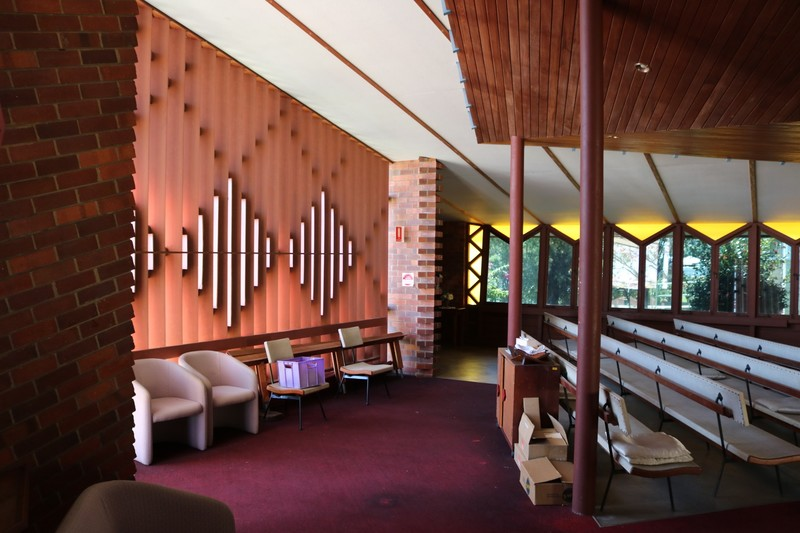
Rear of nave inside entry, 2021

Originally set within the front entrance doors were four triangular glass panels featuring the Methodist Church emblem that were designed by Oribin and imported from England. After three of the panels were damaged, the fourth was removed and all were replaced with plain red glass. In 2021, the surviving pane is displayed within the church, mounted on a wall.

Very few other changes have been made to the building in its lifetime. They comprise: installation of modern guttering and drainage; and removal, during the 1970s, of a carillon electronic bell used to signal religious ceremonies, after it malfunctioned.

The church became the Mareeba Uniting Church in 1977 after the amalgamation of the Presbyterian, Methodist, and Congregational churches to form the Uniting Church in Australia. In 2010, the congregation celebrated the 50th anniversary of the church building.

Oribin's contribution to Queensland architecture was recognised by the Queensland Chapter of the Royal Australian Institute of Architects in 2000, when the new "Building of the Year" award for the Far North Region was named in his honour. In 2013, two of Oribin's other works, the first Oribin House and the Oribin Studio received the "Enduring Architecture Award" at the Australian Institute of Architects' Queensland Architecture Awards.

In 2021, the former Mareeba Uniting Church remains highly intact and is an excellent example of the design work of E H Oribin. It is no longer used for church purposes. Following 10 months during which the church was not used for services, initially due to Covid-19 restrictions, the Presbytery of Carpentaria of the Uniting Church in Australia, at the request of the Mareeba congregation, agreed to close the site. The reported reasons were: the church's reduced and aging congregation, the cost of its ongoing maintenance, its location, and traffic issues. The last service held in the church took place on 31 January 2021.

== Description ==
The former Mareeba Uniting Church (1960) is a single-storey church standing near the town centre of Mareeba, between a residential area and the main commercial area. Located on a corner site, with Rankin Street to the north and Walsh Street to the west, the church's main entrance faces northwest to the intersection. Surrounding properties are a mixture of low-rise commercial, residential, and civic buildings in a flat landscape. The building is highly intact, designed in a bold mid-century Modernist architectural style and, viewed from the intersection across its open front church ground, it makes a strong contribution to the immediate streetscape.

=== Church ===
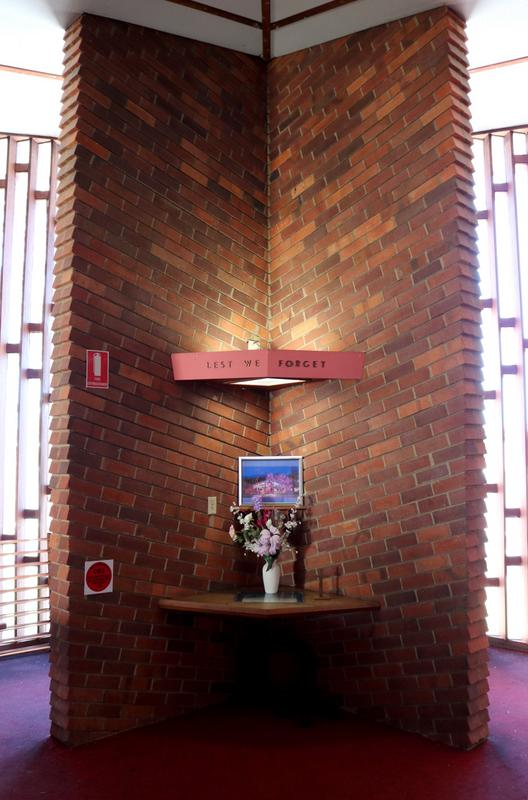
War memorial at base of tower inside church, 2021

The church comprises a square structure with a gable roof that features a sloping ridgeline. A face brick memorial tower rises above the front entrance, topped by a large cross.

The building has a Modernist style with bold forms and high-quality construction techniques, including finely constructed brickwork and joinery, minimal and colourful material palette, and triangle and diamond motifs throughout, found in features such as the shape of the roof, fascia ornamentation, integrated external flower beds, glazing panels, and fixed and movable furniture.

The front street-facing elevations comprise full-height glazing with closely spaced timber framing, forming a striking "screen" to the street. The screens incorporate operable ventilation and cast patterned shadows within the church interior during the day and create a dramatic visual effect when the church is lit up at night. The building corners and tower are face brick and feature protruding interlocking regular bricks at the acute/obtuse corners. Non-street-facing elevations have single-skin, weatherboard-clad walls that angle outwards from the base with a band of timber-framed casement windows. These windows have sashes that have an angled top so that each pair of sashes has a triangular fanlight.

The church has a symmetrical square plan with a diagonal central axis from the front entrance in the northwest corner, into a large and broad nave, to the chancel, and the vestry behind it in the southeast corner. The front entrance has a small recessed landing and two double doors into the nave. Inside the front doors is a V-shaped wall shielding the entrance doors and forming the base of the tower above. It holds a small war memorial shrine comprising wall-hung timber shelves. Nearby is a marble foundation stone set into the brick wall. Above the nave and extending over the chancel is a kite-shaped lowered ceiling lined with clear-finished stained timber boards. The ceiling faces slope gently down to form a peak above the nave. The chancel is raised by one step from the nave and its V-shaped rear wall is lined with diagonal timber boards matching the ceiling. The wall has a large, plain cross made from roughly finished timber, and a diamond-shaped, cantilevered "holy table" similar to that of the war memorial shrine. The small vestry contains a cantilevered table and light trough in the south-east corner, similar to the shrine. Two plain timber doors lead into the church on either side of the rear chancel wall.

Interior finishes in the church are generally minimal, with face brickwork exposed and joinery either stained and clear-finished, or painted brown-orange. The nave has a raw concrete floor, carpeted in some sections, and the building retains original light fittings.

The church retains a considerable amount of original furniture designed by Oribin, which match the church's geometric decorative features.

=== Church setting ===
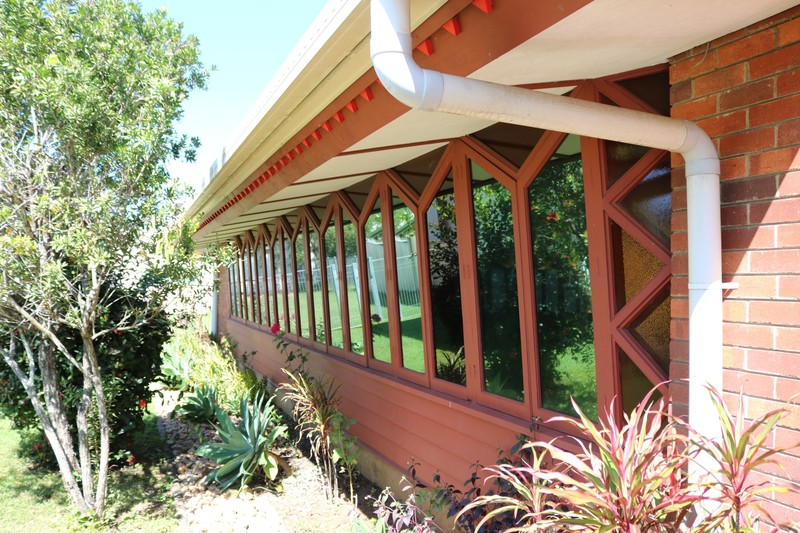
East side of church looking south, 2021

The church's setting comprises open space on its street-facing sides which blends with the open space of the footpath to form a modest and informal civic space partially within the church's allotments and partially within the road reserve. The space has minimal landscaping of grass with a concrete footpath. A wayside pulpit (c. 1960) stands to the southwest side of the church and includes a case for display signs.

=== Views ===
The views of the Rankin Street and Walsh Street elevations and the rooftop tower and its cross from these streets form part of the heritage listing.

== Heritage listing ==
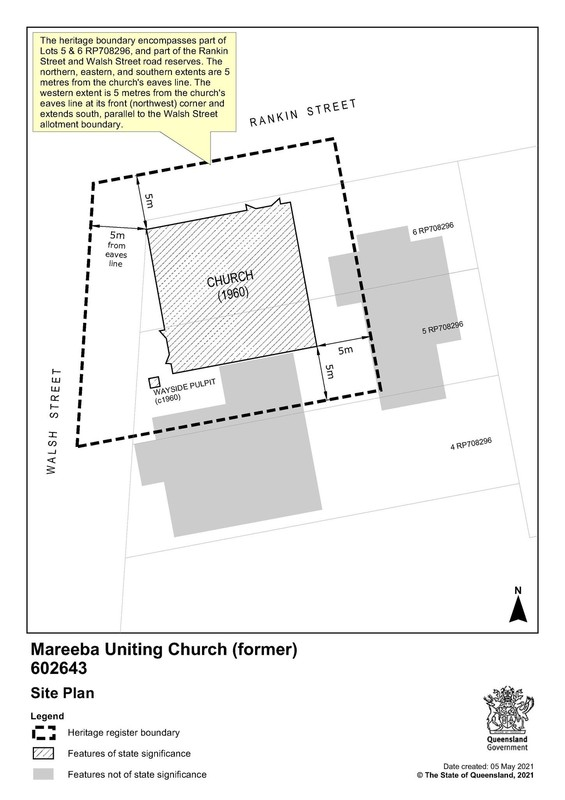
Site plan, 2021

Mareeba Uniting Church was listed on the Queensland Heritage Register on 25 June 2021 having satisfied the following criteria.

The place is important in demonstrating the evolution or pattern of Queensland's history.

Mareeba Uniting Church (former) (1960) is important in demonstrating the growth and expansion of the Methodist Church and the evolution of church architecture in Queensland in the post-World War II (WWII) period. Its Modernist design reflects the post-war mission of the Methodist Church to become more relevant to modern society through liturgical change and extending its services across the state.

The church, in its form, scale, materials and details, is an example of the contribution of renowned architect Edwin Henry (Eddie) Oribin (1927–2016) to the evolution of Queensland architecture through his range of innovative and unique buildings produced in northern Queensland from 1953. His contribution to Queensland architecture is recognised by the Australian Institute of Architects' Eddie Oribin Building of the Year Award for the Far North Queensland region.

Incorporated in the church is a mid-20th-century memorial tower dedicated to those who served Australia during World War I (WWI) and WWII, which is important in demonstrating the community's involvement in these major world events. War memorials are a tribute to those who served, and those who died, from a particular community. They are an important element of Queensland towns and cities and are important in demonstrating a common pattern of commemoration across Queensland and Australia.

The place is important in demonstrating the principal characteristics of a particular class of cultural places.

Mareeba Uniting Church (former) is important in demonstrating the principal characteristics of a post-WWII Modernist church in Queensland. Highly intact and an exceptional example of its type, it retains its: bold Modernist architectural style; incorporation of traditional Christian spaces (nave, chancel, vestry), configurations, and motifs in non-traditional forms; minimal material palette; tower; and original church furniture (holy table, pulpit, lectern, baptismal stand, presiders chairs, communion rails, pews, and plant pots).

The place is also important in demonstrating the principal characteristics of Oribin's work. Embodying architectural concepts Oribin developed and refined over his career, Mareeba Uniting Church (former) is remarkable for its complex architectural simplicity, incorporating: the use of a rational plan grid and geometry; unconventional roof form; a high degree of craftsmanship and attention to detail; triangular decorative motifs; screen walls of glass and timber; simplified building forms and spatial arrangements; minimal material palette; creative manipulation of natural light and ventilation; and custom-designed, hand-crafted furniture.

The place is important because of its aesthetic significance.

Mareeba Uniting Church (former) is located on a corner site and possesses attributes derived from its symmetry, form, scale, materials, detailed and assembly, manipulation of light and shadow, and Modernist style. The all-encompassing decorative aesthetic of the place includes coordinating original furniture.

The place is important in demonstrating a high degree of creative or technical achievement at a particular period.

The former Mareeba Uniting Church demonstrates its form, scale, materials, and details, employing standard building materials and elements. The architectural qualities of the church were noted in contemporary published reports on the building.
