= Mareeba Shire Hall =

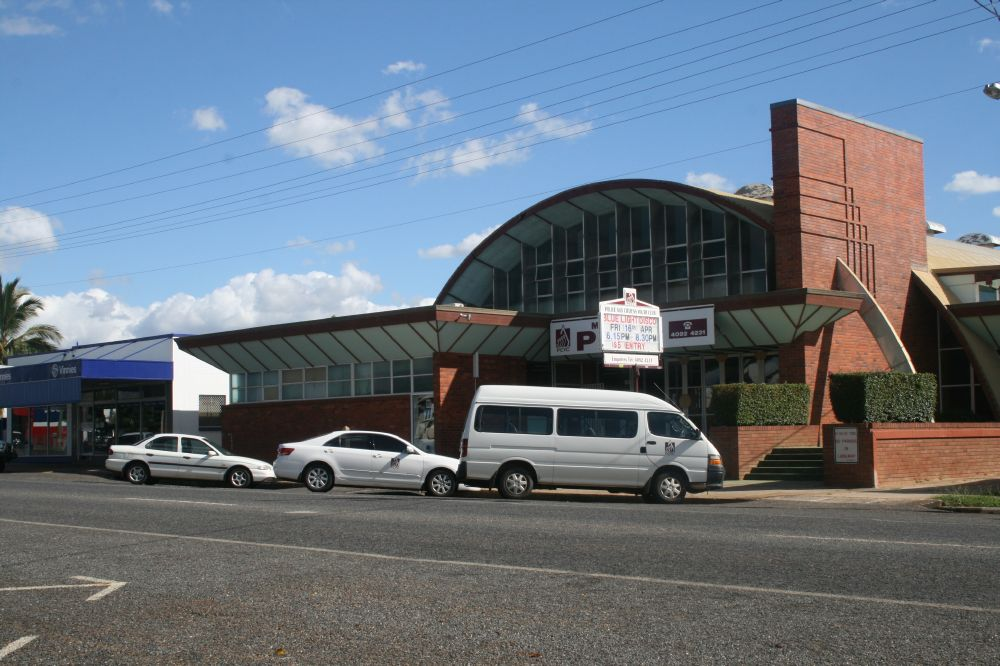
- Mareeba Shire Hall, 2010

- Location within Queensland Location within Australia
- 16.9918°S 145.4231°E
- Location: 136 Walsh Street, Mareeba, Shire of Mareeba, Queensland, Australia

History
- Design period: 1940s–1960s (post-World War II)
- Built: 1960–1961

Site notes
- Architect: Eddie Oribin
- Architectural style: Functionalism

Queensland Heritage Register
- Official name: Mareeba Shire Hall (former), Former Mareeba Shire Hall
- Type: state heritage (built)
- Designated: 11 October 2013
- Reference no.: 601553
- Builders: Ernest William Lepinath

Mareeba Shire Hall is a heritage-listed former town hall at 136 Walsh Street, Mareeba, Shire of Mareeba, Queensland, Australia. It was designed by Eddie Oribin and built from 1960 to 1961 by Ernest William Lepinath. It is also known as Former Mareeba Shire Hall. It was added to the Queensland Heritage Register on 11 October 2013.

== History ==
The former Mareeba Shire Hall in Walsh Street was constructed in 1960–1961 for the Mareeba Shire Council. It was designed by Cairns based architect Edwin Henry (Eddie) Oribin in 1956, and was his first major solo project. It was constructed by local builder Ernest Lepinath, with engineering details provided by R McLean. The hall's structure is a combination of timber framing, concrete and brick, and features a striking semi-circular roof of laminated timber arches, an early use of this structural system in Queensland.

The Atherton Tableland, west of Cairns in Far North Queensland, was named after squatter John Atherton, who was the first person to establish a cattle run in the area in the late 1870s. In the 1880s the Atherton family established a wayside inn and store at the crossing of Granite Creek, supplying goods to traffic passing between Port Douglas to the north and the new tin mining township of Herberton to the south. A settlement grew on the southern side of Granite Creek and a town, named Mareeba, was surveyed by EB Rankin in 1891. In 1893 it became a railhead when the Tableland railway from Cairns to Kuranda was extended, and by 1919 Mareeba was the district's most important town.

In 1919 Mareeba became the administrative centre for what was then Woothakata Shire, and a Shire Council Chambers building was constructed on the corner of Rankin and Walsh streets in 1924. The shire changed its name to Mareeba in 1947. Owing its prosperity to a diverse agricultural economy, post-World War II Mareeba grew to become the largest tobacco-growing centre in Australia, and in 1954 the town's population reached 3369.

The former Mareeba Shire Hall was constructed on the site of the council-owned Mareeba School of Arts (1907) which was destroyed by fire on 28 March 1954. The loss of the largest hall in Mareeba was keenly felt by the community; however disagreements between local councillors about the possible relocation of the hall to another site, and the burden of reconstruction costs to ratepayers, delayed the decision to rebuild. During this process, Cairns architects Barnes and Oribin, who were designing a hall in Ravenshoe at the time, were consulted about cost estimates.

In July 1955 it was announced that a new Shire Hall would be built on the existing Walsh Street site at an estimated cost of £37,000. Plans prepared by Barnes and Oribin were accepted, with the new design incorporating all the functions of the previous School of Arts. The proposed building was described as "an igloo building, with brick front and timber structure and with a hall said to be larger than that of Innisfail's famous civic headquarters". To accommodate the width of the new hall and provide sufficient access to side and rear entrances, the Council purchased additional land along the northern boundary of the site in 1955 and 1957.

Edwin Henry (Eddie) Oribin was born in Cairns in 1927. As a teenager during World War II, he spent time in Brisbane working with the Allison Aircraft Division of General Motors rebuilding aircraft engines. Returning to Cairns in 1944, Oribin commenced architectural training with Sid G Barnes, Chief Architect of the Allied Works Council for North Queensland, whose training gave Oribin a solid grounding in structural design and construction. In 1950 Oribin moved to Brisbane to work and study, and on 10 February 1953 he obtained his registration as an architect in Queensland, returning to Cairns the following month to begin a partnership with Barnes. This partnership lasted until Barnes' death in 1959, after which Oribin continued practicing on his own.

Oribin undertook a wide range of work in North Queensland between 1953 and 1973. Throughout his career, he was devoted to experimenting with different structural and aesthetic ideas, drawing inspiration from a wide variety of Australian and international publications. Characteristics of Oribin's work included meticulous detailing, structural creativity and concern for the modulation of light. He was also known for his model-making skills and superb craftsmanship, often creating objects himself.

During the 1950s Barnes, and later Barnes and Oribin, were well known architects in Cairns and the Atherton Tablelands, receiving numerous commissions for a range of small- and medium-scale projects, such as fire stations, shops and hospital facilities. Prior to working on the Mareeba Shire Hall, Barnes and Oribin had designed at least two other halls in the region: the RSL Memorial Hall at Babinda (completed 1954, destroyed by Cyclone Larry in 2006, rebuilt 2010) and Ravenshoe Divisional Hall (designed 1954, completed early 1960).

Public halls of varying design and dimension are landmarks of Australia's cities and suburbs, shires and towns, important as social venues and focal points for their communities. In the mid to late 20th century, hall designs were evolving away from the traditional concept of a central auditorium with council chambers and municipal offices attached, towards more multi-purpose halls and civic centres. Many new halls constructed throughout Queensland during this period replaced earlier halls that had been destroyed or become inadequate for communities' needs. While each contained a different combination of features and facilities, such as clock towers, libraries, supper rooms, public toilets, memorials, shops or offices, common to all public halls was a large multi-purpose auditorium with stage and dressing rooms.

Construction of the Mareeba hall began in 1960. The laminated timber arches were constructed by the builder E Lepinath in a nearby warehouse before being transported to the site and erected. These arches were able to span the 60-foot (18 m) wide floor, allowing for an unobstructed ceiling height of 20 feet (6.1 m).

Laminated timber arches, constructed by overlapping and bolting together small pieces of timber to make a single, large member, have been in use in Australia since the mid-19th century. Cost-effective and able to span large distances without intermediate posts, laminated timber arches also became an alternative system for roof structures of large buildings such as markets, factories and, from the early 20th century, large auditoriums and picture theatres. The process of glue lamination, using casein glue to bond the layers of timber rather than bolts, originated in Germany before being introduced to the United States in the 1920s. Several publications in the 1930s and early 1940s provided the necessary data for constructing glued laminated timber arches, and became a source of inspiration for Australian designers. The earliest experiments in Australia took place in the early 1940s and the arrival of powerful synthetic resin adhesives in the post-World War II period increased the reliability and range of applications of glue lamination. The former Burge Bros Factory in Melbourne (1945–1946) is considered to be the oldest known surviving example of this technology in Australia, with semi-circular arches spanning 30 metres (98 ft), manufactured by Sydney-based company Ralph Symonds Ltd.

Despite the technology being available, it wasn't until the 1950s, when curved shapes such as conoids and hyperbolic parabolas became fashionable, that glue laminated arches were more commonly used in Australia, particularly for church structures. Recognising the structural and aesthetic potential of this new technology, Oribin specified glue laminated timber arches for two of his earliest buildings, St Paul's Anglican Memorial Church in Proserpine and the Mareeba Shire Hall; both were designed in 1956 and completed within 5 years, making them an early use of the technology in Queensland. The Proserpine church was completed first, in 1959, with engineering details for both buildings provided by Cairns engineer R McLean.

The "igloo type of construction" of the hall's design, made possible by the glue laminated arches, was viewed favourably by the local councillors, as it was seen as a cheaper method of covering large areas than more conventional structures. World War II igloos, with their large curved trusses made from small pieces of timber, were a familiar building type in the region and to Oribin, who had worked in the Allison Overhaul Assembly Plant igloos at Albion during World War II.

The hall was officially opened on 15 March 1961 by the chairman of the Mareeba Shire Council, Cedric Lewis Davies, having cost a total of £74,000. The main auditorium provided seating accommodation for 800 people and a dance floor of approximately 6,000 square feet (560 m^{2}). The area under the stage and dressing rooms contained a kitchen and supper room. The main entrance foyer provided cloak room facilities, a ticket box and soft drink bar, as well as stairs to a gallery level above. Sliding metal and coloured glass screens separated the foyer from the auditorium. The library was located in front of the auditorium with a separate entrance, and contained "outdoor reading rooms" and a workroom enclosed with vertical wooden louvres. A newspaper article described the hall as having been "constructed on very modern lines and featured flood and spot lighting designed to give the best effects for stage production". Considerable attention was given to natural ventilation, through the ridgeline and high side windows and through the perforated brick panels in the side window bays. Oribin's characteristic innovation and attention to detail was evident throughout the design, from the carefully planned layout and circulation routes, the complex intersection of horizontal and curved elements in the roof structure, to the use of the circle motif in ornamentation.

The new hall soon became the heart of social and cultural life in Mareeba, hosting numerous events including dances, plays, musical performances and film screenings. The integrity of Oribin's design led to the hall's survival through many cyclones and its use as a community evacuation centre during severe tropical Cyclone Yasi in February 2011. The hall has been occupied by the Mareeba Police-Citizens Youth Club (PCYC) since 1999 and in 2013 is still used for a variety of community purposes.

Various alterations have been made to the hall over time. Partitions within the former library were changed to create office and storage areas, and no library shelving or joinery remains. The former cloak room, ticket office and soft drink bar have also become office space. A recent store room has been constructed along the southern wall of the auditorium, an original store room converted into a kitchen, and the original tiered floor has been removed. Additions to the northern side include a timber partition wall, concealing the entrances to the toilets, and a kitchenette. The renovated former supper room retains its early layout, with a modernised kitchen at the northern end.

Oribin's significant contribution to Queensland architecture was recognised by the Queensland Chapter of the Royal Australian Institute of Architects in 2000, when the new "Building of the Year" award for the Far North Region was named in his honour. In 2013, two of Oribin's other works, the first Oribin House and the Oribin Studio, received the "Enduring Architecture Award" at the Australian Institute of Architects' Queensland Architecture Awards.

== Description ==
The former Mareeba Shire Hall in the Atherton Tablelands town of Mareeba stands on the western side of Walsh Street, which runs parallel to Byrnes Street, the town's main thoroughfare. Located towards the centre of a town block bounded by Middlemiss Street to the north and Atherton Street to the south, the hall with its high curved roof is a prominent building along Walsh Street, which has low-rise residential, commercial and semi-industrial buildings generously spread out along its length. The block is flat and rectangular with an additional small rectangular area to the rear on the southern side, used as a car park. The hall addresses the street with the main entrance approached by a set of steps.

The layout of the hall is designed to a square grid with a circle motif used for ornamentation. Natural finishes are used, with brickwork generally unpainted and timberwork stained. The main structure is cavity brick with a timber and steel roof structure supported by eight semi-circular, laminated timber, three pin arch frames. Concrete piers support the timber auditorium floor and the laminated timber arches are bolted to concrete footings.

Along the ridgeline, natural light enters the hall through sections of translucent roof sheeting. A suspended, arched light cove partially shields views of the roof structure and five large metal ventilators along the ridgeline. The arched roof is clad with corrugated metal sheeting.

The main elevation is composed of overlapping, geometric elements. The dominant semi-circular arch of the auditorium is broken up by a tall brick tower on the northern side of the main entrance. The exaggerated inclined soffit of the single-storey side walls of the hall cuts across the main elevation and around the projecting box of the former library on the southern side of the entrance. A smaller, secondary entrance on the far northern side is set back, and long brick planter boxes project towards the street. The pavement and stairs in front of the main entrances are of green concrete inscribed with a pattern of squares.

The upper end wall of the auditorium is of frosted glass set in metal frames in wide vertical strips divided by aluminium-clad fins. The glazed main entrance doors are four sets of timber-framed double doors ornamented with semi-circle and quarter-circle timber pieces. The doors swing from round poles and the circle motif is carried through to the pattern of vinyl tiles on the foyer floor. To the left of the main entrance a corridor leads to the former library entrance, which has a glazed wall along one side. The former library has plain brick walls and banks of frosted glass windows running below soffit level, turning the corner at the southern end. Attached to the northern wall is a plaque commemorating the hall's opening.

The tower is ornamented with a pattern of lines formed by raised brickwork. Two semi-circular elements protrude through the tower continuing the curve of the auditorium roof, a single aluminum-clad truss towards the front and a section of curved roofing at the rear, sheltering a garden bed which was originally a small pool.

The side walls are divided by brick piers into bays, with ventilation openings incorporated within raised brickwork patterns. Banks of rectangular awning windows connect the top of each bay with the roof soffit. Clerestory windows above this roof level run the length of the auditorium.

The inclined face of the roof soffits are clad in flat fibrous plaster sheeting ornamented with regularly spaced cover strips painted a contrasting colour. The top fascia is made from horizontal tongue-and-groove v-jointed boards. The rear wall of the hall is flat brickwork with no ornamentation. Concrete steps lead from the south-west corner down to a sunken area behind the building, overlooked by louvred windows and three doors from the former supper room below the stage. Timber staircases at either end of this area lead to the rear of the stage and to a small toilet block at the northern end.

The interior layout consists of the entrance foyer at the front with a concrete staircase on the northern side leading to the gallery level. On the southern side of the foyer are the former cloak room, ticket box and soft drink bar. The auditorium occupies the full width of the main portion of the hall with the stage and dressing rooms at the far end. The toilets are located in the north-west corner of the hall and a sunken area along the northern wall provides access to side doors. Along the southern wall, ramps lead down to the side doors and a former store room at the western end is now a kitchen. Between this kitchen and the stage a staircase leads down to the former supper room. The former library in the south-east corner of the building has been divided into an office at the front and store rooms at the rear.

Passing through all ground-level rooms and on both sides of the auditorium are continuous flat lighting coves. Clad in stained plywood with an angled timber fascia, the undersides of the lighting coves are pierced by regularly spaced square lights. The ceiling above these coves is clad in perforated plywood. Other light fittings are generally circular. Throughout the building the footings of the laminated timber arches are exposed.

The front portion of the former library has been converted into an office with no early joinery remaining. The floor is carpeted and the brick walls have been lined and painted. The rear portion, accessed from inside the hall, has had modern partition walls inserted to form two store rooms. Remnant cork flooring remains attached to the concrete slab, revealing the location of original walls which enclosed a workroom and children's outdoor reading room. The original ceiling and lighting coves remain throughout.

The entrance foyer has vinyl floor tiles and a low ceiling clad in perforated panels with decorative cover strips. Round columns support the gallery above. One panel of a sliding decorative metal screen remains in its track under the lighting cove.

The cantilevered concrete staircase to the gallery has a metal balustrade with circle ornamentation. The gallery is a stepped concrete slab surrounded by a solid balustrade, which is ornamented with cover strips in a pattern of lines and rectangles on the auditorium side.

The former cloak room, ticket box and soft drink bar are partially surrounded by timber counters with sliding windows above. Inside, an opening has been created between the rooms and the ticket box and cloak room counters removed.

The main arched ceiling of the auditorium is clad in perforated ceiling panels and the ceiling cove is clad in fibrous plaster sheeting. The cove is supported by curved timber hangers and has circular lights in two rows in the underside. The auditorium floor is polished timber.

The southern side of the auditorium has bench seating along the exterior wall. The kitchen, accessed by a sliding timber door, has laminated timber benches and a tiled floor. A recent store room adjacent to the former library, constructed from timber stud walls, is not of cultural heritage significance. Along the northern side of the hall, low brick walls define the edges of the sunken area, which has the same green concrete steps and floor as used for the exterior entrance areas. Double doors are aligned with the steps. The middle section of this area has been raised to the same level as the auditorium floor, with alterations made to the light cove and brick walls to accommodate a kitchenette. The male and female toilets have tiled floors and rendered and painted walls. A store room adjacent to the male toilets contains solid timber shelving.

The stage is accessed from the hall by a set of movable steps. On either side are curving walls ornamented with battens that conceal the side wings. The sounding board above the stage is clad in stained plywood. The stage floor is raked and curves outwards, clad in polished timber boards with footlights concealed beneath a removable timber board. Curtains line the wings and rear wall of the stage and the ceiling structure is exposed.

The former supper room is a long, low space with exposed steel beams supporting the stage above. The ceiling is clad in perforated panels, the walls are rendered and painted and the concrete floor has a recent epoxy coating. Exit doors in the western wall are accessed by concrete steps. The raised kitchen area at the northern end has been refurbished.

The hall is a striking building that stands out from surrounding low-set commercial buildings on Walsh Street.

== Heritage listing ==
The former Mareeba Shire Hall was listed on the Queensland Heritage Register on 11 October 2013 having satisfied the following criteria.

The place is important in demonstrating the evolution or pattern of Queensland's history.

The Mareeba Shire Hall, completed in 1961, is important in demonstrating the Queensland pattern of local governments expressing civic pride through building public halls. With its bold design, the hall is an outstanding example of the type of public halls constructed in the mid to late 20th century to replace older halls that had been destroyed or become inadequate for the community's needs.

As his first large solo project, the Mareeba Shire Hall is an outstanding example of the work of Cairns architect Edwin Henry (Eddie) Oribin, who produced a range of innovative and unique buildings in north Queensland between 1953 and 1973. Oribin's contribution to Queensland architecture is recognised by the Australian Institute of Architects' establishment of the Eddie Oribin Building of the Year Award for the Far North Queensland region.

The place is important in demonstrating the principal characteristics of a particular class of cultural places.

The Mareeba Shire Hall is important in demonstrating the principal characteristics of a public hall, with an impressive exterior, a large multi-purpose auditorium, stage and dressing rooms, entrance foyer, gallery, kitchen, supper room, and former cloakroom, ticket box, bar and library.

The creativity, craftsmanship and attention to detail evident in the hall's design are characteristic of the works of architect Eddie Oribin, whose buildings are remarkable for their complex geometries, unconventional roof forms, innovative use of materials and structural systems, and manipulation of natural light and ventilation.

The place is important because of its aesthetic significance.

The Mareeba Shire Hall has aesthetic significance as a distinctive building of exceptional architectural quality. The striking asymmetrical composition of strong, dynamic forms, including the semi-circular hall, deeply inclined soffits and tall brick tower, reflects the worldwide influence of expressive modern architecture.

These qualities are evident in the interior of the hall, where the architect has created a daring and complex composition of horizontal and curving forms, utilising natural materials and finishes and carefully manipulating natural light.

The place is important in demonstrating a high degree of creative or technical achievement at a particular period.

The Mareeba Shire Hall demonstrates a high degree of creative and technical achievement for the period in Queensland. It was the first major building solely designed by Oribin, displaying his enthusiasm for experimentation and his ability to adapt international architectural influences to suit local site and climatic conditions.

The main structural feature of the hall, semi-circular arches made from glue laminated timber, was an early use of this technology in Queensland.
