= St Paul's Anglican Church, Proserpine =

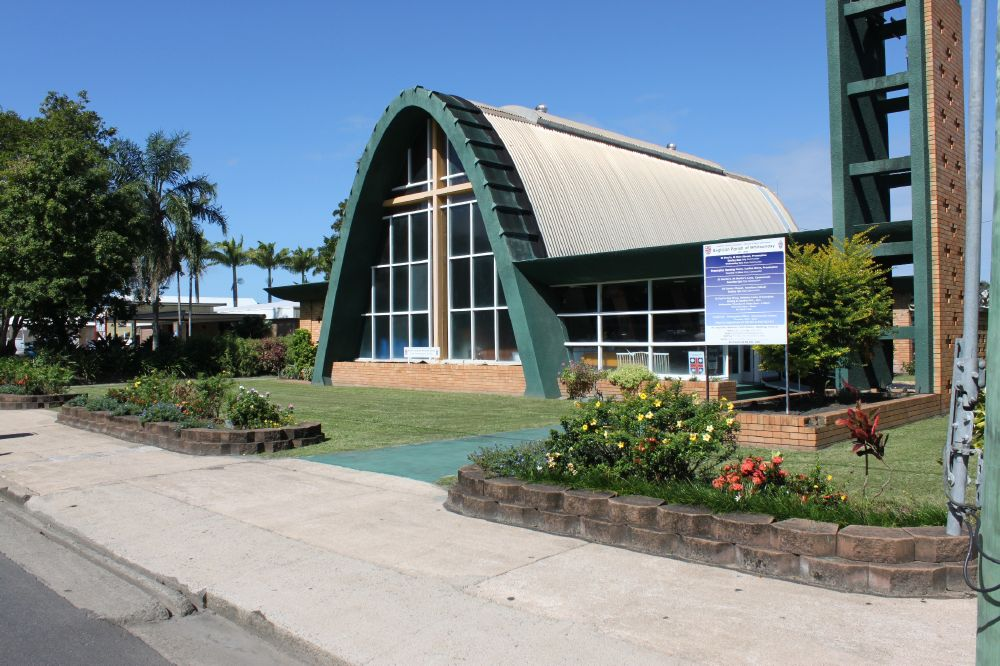
- St Paul's Anglican Church, Proserpine, 2013

- Location within Queensland Location within Australia
- 20.4017°S 148.58°E
- Location: 8 Main Street, Proserpine, Whitsunday Region, Queensland, Australia

History
- Design period: 1940s–1960s (post-World War II)
- Built: 1958–1959

Site notes
- Architect: Eddie Oribin
- Architectural style: Modernism

Queensland Heritage Register
- Official name: St Paul's Anglican Church, St Paul's Anglican Memorial Church, Proserpine Church of England
- Type: state heritage (built)
- Designated: 11 October 2013
- Reference no.: 601589
- Significant period: 1958–
- Builders: Les Tinsley & Co

St Paul's Anglican Church is a heritage-listed church at 8 Main Street, Proserpine, Whitsunday Region, Queensland, Australia. It was designed by Eddie Oribin and built from 1958 to 1959 by Les Tinsley & Co. It is also known as St Paul's Anglican Memorial Church and Proserpine Church of England. It was added to the Queensland Heritage Register on 11 October 2013.

== History ==
St Paul's Anglican Church in Proserpine, completed in 1959, is one of a series of innovative churches designed by Cairns-based architect Edwin Henry (Eddie) Oribin. It was constructed by local builder Les Tinsley and Co. with engineering details provided by R McLean. The church is made from a variety of materials including brick, timber and concrete, and features a striking parabolic roof of laminated timber arches, an early use of this structural system in Queensland.

The Proserpine area was first settled from the 1860s and agriculture became the main industry. An initial attempt at sugar cane production in the early 1880s at Glen Isla plantation failed and the estate was subsequently sold and subdivided into small farms. Much of the present-day Proserpine town area occupies land formerly part of the plantation site. A stable sugar-growing industry was eventually established in Proserpine in 1897 with the opening of the Proserpine Central Mill. By 1900, there were 200 settlers and 70 suppliers to the mill.

Anglican services in Proserpine, which was then part of Bowen Parish, had been established by 1896 when church services were conducted by a visiting clergyman from Bowen. In 1904 a building committee was formed to oversee the establishment of a Church of England in Proserpine, so that regular services could be held and a Sunday School set up. Fundraising was undertaken, and by early 1905 the committee had secured a site in Main Street, opposite the mill. The first St Paul's Church of England, a small timber building, was completed in 1906.

Proserpine continued to grow throughout the early 20th century, with the population nearly doubling in the 1920s and a rail link to Mackay, completing the North Coast railway line from Brisbane to Townsville, opening in 1923. However, until the 1950s Proserpine remained a country sugar town, a stopover place rather than a destination in itself, with little appeal to visitors. Proserpine Airport opened in late 1951, boosting tourism to the local area and Whitsunday Islands.

The 1950s were a significant period of change and reform within Anglican and other Christian denominations throughout Australia, as they sought to become more relevant to contemporary society. Developments in religious theology and liturgy, coupled with an expansionary building program, led to a radical departure from established architectural traditions. Reflecting international trends, church designs moved away from historical revival styles and became increasingly influenced by Modernism. However, it was expected that a church would still be recognisable as such, resulting in a wide range of variations combining traditional church elements, symbols and functions with new construction techniques, materials and forms.

A particular advocate of constructing churches in a modern idiom was Bishop Ian Shevill, the sixth Anglican Bishop of North Queensland (enthroned in 1953), who began a crusade to provide a permanent church in every parish. Having travelled to the United States of America to learn new methods of fundraising, Shevill implemented the Anglican Building Crusade, which raised £145,000 for buildings. Of the amount raised by each parish, half was retained and half went to the diocese.

In order to encourage construction of modern rather than pseudo-Gothic style churches, the Bishop compiled a set of canonical principles of church architecture, which were a set of rules ensuring certain aspects of Anglican church designs remained constant while allowing architects to exercise their creativity. These principles prescribed such things as setting aside a third of the church for the sanctuary and two thirds for the nave, the proportions of steps leading up to the altar, and that furnishings be designed by the architect. All new Anglican churches were to be individual and contemporary in design, for, as Shevill himself put it: "God is no museum piece and He should be worshipped by modern people in modern buildings which are aesthetically pleasing and cool". By 1958, six new permanent Anglican churches and a chapel had been completed according to these principles.

Steps towards constructing a new church at Proserpine began in 1956 when architects Barnes and Oribin of Cairns were engaged. Designed by Oribin, the proposed church was highly unusual, with a parabolic roofed nave, glazed end wall with a central concrete cross, flat side roofs and separate brick tower.

Edwin Henry (Eddie) Oribin was born in Cairns in 1927. As a teenager during World War II, he spent time in Brisbane where he obtained work with the Allison Aircraft Division of General Motors rebuilding aircraft engines. Returning to Cairns in 1944, Oribin commenced architectural training with Sidney George Barnes, Chief Architect of the Allied Works Council for North Queensland, whose training gave Oribin a solid grounding in structural design and construction. In 1950 Oribin moved to Brisbane to work and study, and on 10 February 1953 he obtained his registration as an architect in Queensland, returning to Cairns the following month to begin a partnership with Barnes. This partnership lasted until Barnes' death in 1959, after which Oribin continued practicing on his own.

Oribin undertook a wide range of work in North Queensland between 1953 and 1973. Throughout his career, he was devoted to experimenting with different structural and aesthetic ideas, drawing inspiration from a wide variety of Australian and international publications. Characteristics of Oribin's work included meticulous detailing, structural creativity and concern for the modulation of light. He was also known for his model-making skills and superb craftsmanship, often creating objects himself.

St Paul's Anglican Church at Proserpine was one of three churches designed by Oribin between 1956 and 1960, the others being Mareeba Uniting Church (formerly Methodist Church, completed 1960) and St Andrew's Presbyterian Memorial Church, Innisfail (completed 1960). Each of these churches is distinctive in design, having directly responded to the needs of the clients, while still allowing experimentation with construction and design ideas.

By mid-1958 Proserpine parish's participation in the Anglican Building Crusade had raised over £3000 and their own fundraising campaign was supported and encouraged by Bishop Shevill, who stated "...I should like to congratulate the wardens and council upon their adoption of a design which is so revolutionary and so progressive, for it will provide the parish with a contemporary building of great beauty and one which will make religion relevant to the 20th Century people who believe in progress...". The original timber church was relocated to the rear of the property and Cairns contractors Les Tinsley and Co. began construction of the new St Paul's in June 1958. The Governor of Queensland, Col. Sir Henry Abel Smith, laid the foundation stone in a ceremony on 9 July, during which he inspected a model of the proposed new church and discussed the building with the architect.

Constructed on site, the main parabolic frames of St Paul's Church were of laminated timber, with the exception of the front frame which was made of pre-cast concrete. The first two laminated arches constructed were used as the basis for the formwork of the front concrete arch. The unusual form of the nave with its exposed internal structure led to it being compared to World War II igloos. With their large curved trusses made from small pieces of timber, igloos were a familiar building type to Oribin who had worked in the Allison Overhaul Assembly Plant igloos at Albion during World War II.

The parabolic arch has been associated with church architecture since at least the 1880s. German architect Dominikus Bohm (1880–1955) exploited the possibilities of the parabolic arch in several 1920s church designs, demonstrating that the kind of atmosphere commonly associated with Gothic architecture could be obtained with a minimum of historical allusion. Though it remained an uncommon architectural form in the early 20th century, it featured in several Modernist churches, most notably the Church of St Francis of Assisi (completed 1943) in Pampulha, Brazil, designed by Brazilian architect Oscar Niemeyer (1907–2012). Constructed from cast in-situ concrete, the nave of the church was a free-standing parabolic vault. Highly controversial at the time, Niemeyer's bold design was extremely influential among architects around the world (including Australia), with photographs and plans of the church published in architectural journals.

The parabolic form of St Paul's was made possible by the use of glued laminated timber for the internal arches. Laminated timber arches, constructed by overlapping and bolting together small pieces of timber to make a single, large member, have been in use in Australia since the mid-19th century. Cost-effective and able to span large distances without intermediate posts, laminated timber arches also became an alternative system for roof structures of large buildings such as markets, factories and, from the early 20th century, large auditoria and picture theatres. The process of glue lamination, using casein glue to bond the layers of timber rather than bolts, originated in Germany before being introduced to the United States in the 1920s. Several publications in the 1930s and early 1940s provided the necessary data for constructing glued laminated timber arches, and became a source of inspiration for Australian designers. The earliest experiments in Australia took place in the early 1940s and the arrival of powerful synthetic resin adhesives in the post- World War II period increased the reliability and range of applications of glue lamination. The former Burge Bros Factory in Melbourne (1945–46) is considered to be the oldest known surviving example of this technology in Australia, with semi-circular arches spanning 30 metres (98 ft), manufactured by Sydney-based company Ralph Symonds Ltd.

Despite the technology being available, it wasn't until the 1950s, when curved shapes such as conoids and hyperbolic parabolas became fashionable, that glue laminated arches were more commonly used in Australia, particularly for church structures. Recognising the structural and aesthetic potential of this new technology, Oribin specified glue laminated timber arches for two of his earliest buildings, the Mareeba Shire Hall and Proserpine's St Paul's Church; both were designed in 1956 and completed within 5 years, making them an early use of the technology in Queensland. St Paul's was completed first, with engineering details for both buildings provided by Cairns engineer R McLean.

Oribin designed all aspects of the church, including internal fixtures and furnishings, and his attention to detail led him to personally craft some items. Timber furniture included the baptismal font, lectern, pulpit, candle holders, stools and pews. A pair of aumbry cupboard doors, depicting stylised interpretations of Saints Peter and Paul, were designed and routed by Oribin himself. Oribin also personally produced seven acid-etched copper panels, each depicting one of the sacraments, to ornament the baptismal font lid. Other copper work for the sanctuary lights, candle holders and spun copper font were designed by Oribin and produced in Sydney. His work was so valued by the Proserpine congregation that, years after the church was completed, Oribin was contacted by them to design and detail a simple noticeboard.

The total cost of the finished church came to £22,000. It was dedicated by Bishop Shevill on 4 July 1959, coinciding with American Independence Day. During the ceremony a memorial plaque was unveiled by ET Bourne, the second secretary of the US Embassy in Canberra. The design of the church attracted a great deal of attention from locals and visitors, as well as the wider Anglican community. In the September 1960 edition of "The Northern Churchman," the church is praised both for its beauty and iconic status:

"The Proserpine building is judged by competent critics to be one of the most imaginative and beautiful conceptions amongst our Parish Churches in which every detail of colour and form has been true to the Canons of Liturgy and Art. It is without doubt the finest building in this town and a tribute to the parish."

Local newspaper "The Proserpine Guardian" speculated that Proserpine "may be known increasingly not just as a sugar town, or even as the jumping off ground for the famed Whitsunday Islands, but as the town with THAT CHURCH".

When completed, the parabolic roof was clad in flat aluminium sheeting, folded over angled timber fillets which ran horizontally along the length of the roof. Panels of translucent corrugated fibreglass sheeting ran along the apex and in six vertical strips at the southern end. By 1968, problems with leaking led to the roof sheeting being replaced with corrugated aluminium. Repairs and changes have been made since and all of the original translucent sections of the parabolic roof have been replaced with opaque sheeting. Thus, internal features such as the side-lighting of the sanctuary wall and indirect light along the apex of the parabolic ceiling have been lost.

The church has been damaged by cyclones over the years. In January 1970 Cyclone Ada struck, causing flooding and damage to buildings in the Proserpine area. While carpets and cork tiles were badly damaged, there was no structural damage to the church, which was used as a temporary place of shelter for affected people. In 1977 St Paul's Church was consecrated when it became debt free.

Later additions to the church include toilets, built against the back wall of the church, and a brick columbarium wall near the entrance, both added in 1995. A rectory, which stood behind the church, was sold and removed in early 2004, and a recent steel building has been constructed in its place. The original timber church has also been demolished. St Paul's continues to function as the main church for the Parish of Proserpine.

Oribin's significant contribution to Queensland architecture was recognised by the Queensland Chapter of the Royal Australian Institute of Architects in 2000, when the new "Building of the Year" award for the Far North Region was named in his honour. In 2013, two of Oribin's other works, the first Oribin House and the Oribin Studio received the "Enduring Architecture Award" at the Australian Institute of Architects' Queensland Architecture Awards.

== Description ==
St Paul's Anglican Church, a striking parabolic arched structure of concrete, brick, timber and glass, is located in Proserpine in the Whitsunday Region of northern Queensland. Orientated with its longitudinal axis north–south, the church is positioned at the front of a long rectangular block on the southern side of Main Street. The church is largely intact, retaining its original furniture and fittings. The most notable alterations have been to the roof, where original translucent sections have been replaced with opaque sheeting.

The dominant element of the church's design is the parabolic arched roof over the nave and sanctuary. Clad in metal roof sheeting, the parabolic form is created by a reinforced concrete arch at the front, regularly spaced laminated timber arches throughout the interior and a brick end wall at the rear. A raised strip of roofing along the apex is clad in opaque sheeting.

Single-storey brick side wings run along either side of the nave, featuring large windows and flat roofs clad in metal sheeting. Straddling the walls are reinforced concrete dished slabs, curving up and away from the top of the walls and overhanging by approximately one metre, acting as both guttering and eaves. The height of this slab indicates a datum level that extends within the church in the form of a flat ceiling over the aisles.

The church is rectangular in plan with an entrance foyer in the north-west corner, linked to a brick and concrete bell tower by a covered walkway. The main elevation of the church is asymmetrical, with the end walls of the wings flanking the central arch being constructed of different materials. The concrete parabolic arch is in-filled with a timber framed glazed wall, with a reinforced concrete cross forming the central spine and a raised brick garden bed running along the base. A series of horizontal ridges on the outer edge of the parabolic arch are remnants of the original roof cladding system. To the side of the arch is the end wall of the eastern aisle, which features small, cross-shaped openings in the brickwork, in-filled with glass. A plaque commemorating the laying of the foundation stone is located here. The entrance foyer on the western side is fully glazed with timber framing and a low brick garden bed along the north side.

The eastern elevation is straight, while along the western elevation the vestry and entry foyer project out beyond the aisle wall. Both elevations are divided into bays by regularly spaced brick piers, with brick infill up to waist height and windows above. The timber framed windows are made up of four awning casements separated by strips of frosted glass in the shape of a cross.

The solid brick wall of the rear elevation is pierced by a high window in the form of a narrow cross. It has two layers of glazing, consisting of an inner layer of coloured glass segments and an outer layer of clear glass. Glazed doors provide access to the vestries. Adjacent to the western vestry door is a toilet block built up against the rear wall (this structure is not considered to be of cultural heritage significance).

The bell tower is approximately 11 metres (36 ft) high, surmounted by an aluminium cross. The tower is constructed from two parallel reinforced concrete walls with decorative brickwork on the outer faces. The two walls are linked by horizontal concrete beams and a bell is hung near the top. A rough render has been applied to the concrete surfaces, with a raised cross ornamenting to the top of each side. A low, rectangular, brick garden bed, originally a reflection pool, projects from the front of the tower.

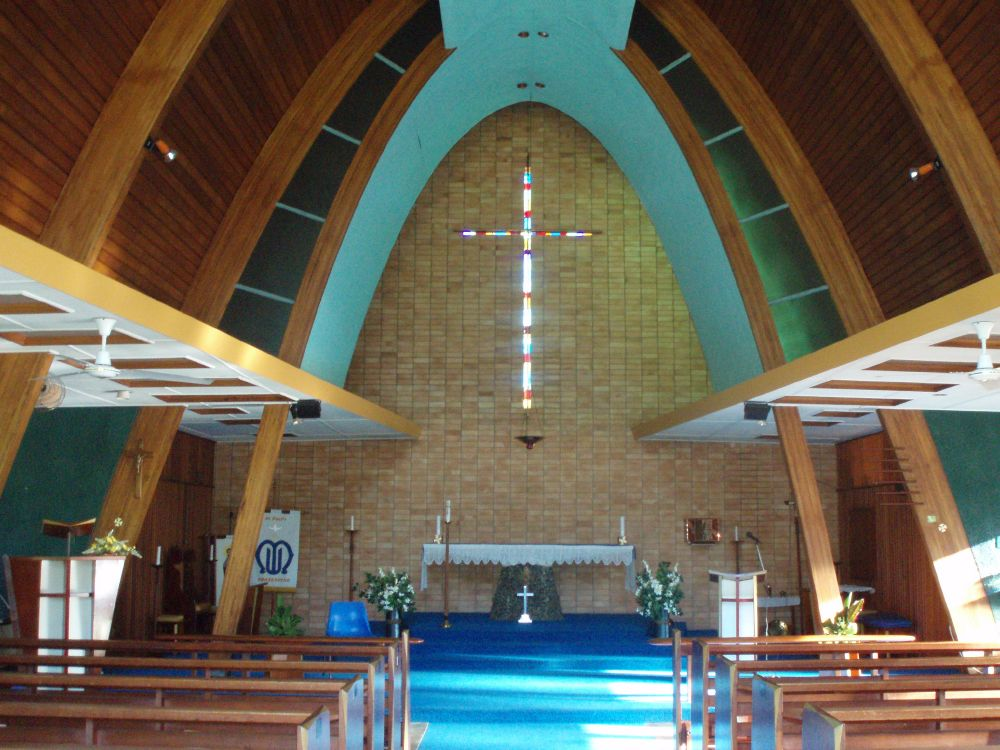
Interior, St Paul's Anglican Church, Proserpine, 2007

Entrance to the church is through the foyer at the north-west corner, through glazed doors on the western side. Aisles run along the eastern and western sides and through the centre of the nave. The sanctuary at the southern end is raised one step above the nave with vestries on either side. The timber pews, like most furniture in the church, have chambered corners painted an off-white colour. The collection plates are made from seven interlocking triangular pieces of timber.

In the centre of the northern glazed wall is the baptismal font, standing on a small raised platform. It consists of a spun copper bowl set on a concrete column. The timber cover is a shallow, seven-sided pyramid, with an etched copper symbol of one of the seven sacraments attached to each face.

An ANZAC shrine in the north-east corner has a bronze plaque attached to the centre of the wall, listing the names of fallen servicemen from the Proserpine district. Above this is a wooden sign bearing the words "Lest We Forget" and a small crucifix. A wooden rack supports flags attached to wooden poles.

The rear sanctuary wall contains the glazed cross-shaped window, which has protruding metal fins attached on the interior. Below, the altar is located in the centre of a raised platform of three steps. The altar has a thick central base that inclines towards the top, clad in dark grey stones. A concrete cantilever angles out from the base to support the altar top, which is made from a terrazzo-like material incorporating pearl shell. Other items of furniture in the sanctuary include candlesticks, pulpit, lectern, and small stools and tables. The candlesticks are free-standing posts with a conical-shaped copper drip ring at the top. The timber pulpit has a protruding timber cross against a white background on the front face and sides that angle out towards the top, which has an angled book holder elevated on a tubular metal stand. The lectern is a simplified version of the pulpit but without the angled sides, and has an overhanging v-shaped top. A cupboard in the western wall of the sanctuary, the aumbry, has images of two saints on the inner face of the door leaves, made visible when opened.

Walls of fixed vertical timber fins divide the sanctuary from the vestries on either side. The eastern vestry contains a small kitchenette and timber pantry cupboard. The western vestry contains built-in timber storage cupboards, a small safe and a corner sink.

The lowered ceilings on either side of the nave give the appearance of floating, horizontal planes, the sides of which are lined with a timber fascia. These converge along the length of the church, towards the sanctuary wall. The undersides are clad in recent plasterboard sheeting, with regularly spaced, rectilinear openings along the inner edge, increasing in width as they approach the sanctuary. Along the top of both side walls the concrete dished slab extends into the church. Smaller in scale than on the exterior, the edges of the slab also curve upwards, pierced with regularly spaced square holes.

The length of the church is divided into bays by the exposed parabolic arches. A scaled-down arch within the arch closest to the sanctuary provides the framework for a lower arched ceiling, lined with plasterboard. The gap between the inner and outer arches is glazed with frosted glass. The lower ceiling stops short of touching the southern sanctuary wall, allowing views of the main roof structure. Throughout the nave, the underside of the parabolic roof is lined with timber, while the tops of the parabolic arches are concealed from view by a high, plasterboard-clad cove.

The church is fronted by a lawn area with recent garden beds along the footpath. A gravel driveway runs along the eastern side of the church and a concrete drive leads past the bell tower to the entrance. Behind the church is a recent steel building, while the remainder of the property is open lawn in 2013.

== Heritage listing ==
St Paul's Anglican Church was listed on the Queensland Heritage Register on 11 October 2013 having satisfied the following criteria.

The place is important in demonstrating the evolution or pattern of Queensland's history.

St Paul's Anglican Church, Proserpine (1959) is important in demonstrating the evolution of church architecture in Queensland as a result of liturgical reform in the post-World War II period. Its design reflects the civic and spiritual ambitions of the Anglican community during a significant phase of constructing modern churches throughout the Diocese of North Queensland.

The church is an outstanding example of the work of Cairns architect Edwin Henry (Eddie) Oribin, who produced a range of innovative and unique buildings in north Queensland between 1953 and 1973. Oribin's contribution to Queensland architecture is recognised by the Australian Institute of Architects' establishment of the Eddie Oribin Building of the Year Award for the Far North Queensland region.

The place is important in demonstrating the principal characteristics of a particular class of cultural places.

St Paul's Anglican Church is important in demonstrating the principal characteristics of post-World War II church architecture, when architects experimented with a wide variety of church designs combining traditional elements, symbols and functions with new construction techniques, materials and forms. St Paul's possesses a traditional church plan expressed in a highly creative and non-traditional way.

The creativity, craftsmanship and attention to detail evident in the church's design are characteristic of the works of architect Eddie Oribin, whose buildings are remarkable for their complex geometries, unconventional roof forms, innovative use of materials and structural systems, manipulation of natural light and ventilation, and custom designed, hand-crafted furniture.

The place is important because of its aesthetic significance.

St Paul's Anglican Church is of aesthetic significance as a distinctive building of exceptional architectural quality, with its striking composition of strong, dynamic forms, including parabolic nave, horizontal entrance canopy and tall bell tower.

The highly intact interior evokes the contemplative quality of traditional ecclesiastical volumes, elevating mind and spirit through symmetrically arranged contemporary forms, the manipulation of natural light and the skilful juxtaposition of contrasting shapes, materials, volumes and textures.

The quality of the craftsmanship of complementary purpose-designed and built furniture, fittings and objects throughout the church is exceptional.

The place is important in demonstrating a high degree of creative or technical achievement at a particular period.

St Paul's Anglican Church demonstrates a high degree of creative and technical achievement in Queensland for the period. A carefully crafted use of an unusual form, the parabolic arch, it was the first of Oribin's buildings to be constructed from arched glue laminated timber beams, an early use of the technology in Queensland.
