= Civil Constructional Corps =

The Civil Constructional Corps (CCC) was a civilian based labour force created in Australia during World War II, designed to organise military construction works. Over 53,500 members were gathered through a combination of conscription (manpowered) and volunteers, conducting work for the Allied Works Council. The formation of the CCC was primarily the responsibility of Ted Theodore, the Director-General of the Allied Works Council who advocated for a civilian based labour force. While there was a success in the work conducted, the pay and conditions showed little respect to members, being a contentious issue contributing to the abolishment of the CCC in 1946.

In April 1942, the CCC was established to supply labour forces for the creation of infrastructure such as aerodromes, gun emplacements, barracks, roads and other projects undertaken by the Allied Works Council.

== Origins ==
As Australia became a signatory of the Declaration of the United Nations on January 1, 1942, this distinguished a formal entry into the Allied Forces. The Allied Forces consisted of 26 nations, coming together in opposition to the Axis Powers. The Declaration signed outlined the war aims of the Allied Forces, notably stating:

“Complete victory over their enemies is essential to defend life, liberty, independence and religious freedom, and to preserve human rights and justice in their own lands as well as in other lands, and that they are now engaged in a common struggle against savage and brutal forces seeking to subjugate the world."

This “common struggle” required immediate assistance from Australia, calling for an actualization of the goals. Such action was initiated in Australia as the Australian Federal Cabinet on 17 February 1942 issued Australia on a complete war basis, regarding all manpower and industrial, finance and economic resources. The Federal Cabinet also formed the Allied Works Council, by National Security Regulations in order to carry out the work required by the Allied Forces. With the Allied Works Council established to organise military construction works in Australia, this demand drastically increased due to the total war demanding greater assistance from the nations as part of the Allied Forces. With the Allied Works Council proving to be insufficient in providing manpower and resources, this lack of the supply of labour paved the way for new organisations to be formed. This issue of requiring more equipment, materials and manpower with the intensifying war was presented to the War Cabinet by Edward Granville Theodore, a former Premier of Queensland (1919 – 1925) and Federal Treasurer (1929 – 1931), holding the position as the Director-General of the Allied Works Council at the time. He recommended the creation of the CCC rather than the proposed Army Construction Companies, with the difference being in that CCC would be civilian based, as opposed to military based system of Army Construction Companies. This recommendation by Ted Theodore came to be accepted on 9 March 1942, and would also grant him control over the CCC. The decision by the War Cabinet called that the CCC be established from volunteers and those called up under military impressment. With control under Ted Theodore, this provided that under an emergency there was the capacity for the CCC to be brought under military control and discipline. Thus, eventuating to the formal formation of the CCC in April 1942 to solve the issue of sourcing more labour and to conduct war-related construction projects. The main purpose in formation was to source and utilise labour for the work of the Allied Works Council, in a format that is not military based, rather civilian based.

== Conscription ==
To create the necessary supply of labour, all men in Australia between 18 and 60 could have been conscripted (manpowered) to serve in the CCC. This was able to occur as conscription was formally re-introduced in mid-1942 by John Curtin which called for all men aged 18 – 35 and single men aged 35 – 45 to join the Citizen Military Forces (CMF). While this impacted soldiers oversees, men were also manpowered on Australian soil. With one of the organisations that men could be sent to being the CCC. However, conscription for CCC had its limits as an exception was made for those men serving in the Australian defence forces or for the Allied forces, those in protected industries, and Australian diplomatic representatives. In addition, civilians who desired to support the war effort within Australian could volunteer to be part of the CCC.

=== Call ups ===
Compulsory call ups were held around Australia, in which the new members were subject to strict policies making it almost impossible to leave the CCC. Such call ups were held in Victoria (4 May 1942), New South Wales (10 June 1942), Queensland (6 July 1942), Western Australia (28 September 1942), South Australia (29 September 1942) and Tasmania (16 February 1943)

Over the next year until August 1943, over 66,000 members were enrolled into the CCC with a discharge of 13,000 due to unfitness. This left over 53,500 members, of which 8,500 were volunteers and 28,000 were previously working for the Allied Works Council at enrolment and thus 17,000 were manpowered.

== Pay and conditions ==
Members working in the CCC were provided limited rights in comparison to normal civilian workers. While the pay was determined by the civilian award rates, this was only agreed upon to also prohibit certain rights such as refusal of work, sick leave, strikes, army entitlement, dependants’ allowances and repatriation benefits. Those in the CCC were required to remain members of and continue to pay contributions to the unions that they were issued too. The wages of members came to £22,360,000 per year (approximately $39,000,000), which was an average weekly earnings of £8/0/8 per person.

When the War Cabinet agreed to the formation of the CCC, Ted Theodore also worked to ensure that any disagreement or action that went against his set policies by the members would have immediate and strong punishments. Ted Theodore wrote to Australian Prime Minister John Curtin, creating a case for his punitive powers on 11 April 1942:

“in offences of the kind referred to above, the offender should be proceeded against immediately by the engineer-in-charge, or similar official, and the case heard without delay by the magistrate. This procedure could be operate d quickly if I am authorised to consent to prosecutions. . . . If the Government is not favourable to granting the authority I seek for the real and active control of this labour, the only alternative I can submit is to arrange that all men called up for Allied works be subject to military attestment and remain under military discipline while they are employed on our works (“Australia in the War of 1939–1945: Series Four (Civil); Volume I: The Government and the People, 1939–1941,” 1953).”

The War Cabinet decided in favour of Ted Theodore on 27 April 1942 and gave him authority for summary prosecutions of offences. As a result of this, while the War Cabinet had established the CCC as a civilian organisation rather than creating the Army Construction Companies, this restriction on the members rights and power given to Ted Theodore the Director-General created a drastic separation from normal industrial practice. This strict control was excused due to the war climate and need for strict discipline due to the urgency of war materials.

=== Allocation of funds ===
In the years prior to the formation of the CCC, Australia’s war effort was relatively minor in contrast to the other nations as part of the Allied Forces. However, the CCC was a contributing factor, yet not exclusive, to the increase in the budget allocation towards the war. Defence expenditure in the fiscal year of 1938 – 1939 was 1.4 per cent of gross national product, which increased to 15 per cent in 1940-1941 and 37 per cent from 1942- 1943, being the beginning years of the CCC. In contrast, the United Kingdom in 1940 was allocating 43 per cent of its gross national product, being a grossly larger amount. John Curtin, the Australian Prime Minister of years 1941 – 1945, announced on 19 February 1942 the National Economic Plan with included taking control of manpower, thus having a direct impact on the CCC. Four of Australia’s states challenged the High Court due to an opposition to the funding scheme, however they dismissed this, confirming the 1942 judgement in a 1957 High Court decision.

== Work ==
Work by the CCC was restricted to works undertaken by the Allied Works Council. Members conducted work around Australia such as working on “docks, aerodromes, roads, gun emplacements, stores, barracks, fuel storage installations, hospitals, workshops, pipelines, wharves, mills and factories (Peter, Grey, & Morris, 2008).” The major occupational categories were labourers (22,000), carpenters (12,000) and truck drivers (3,300), covering this scope of work.

By the end of 1942 the leading CCC Camp on Brisbane’s north side, built across from the Chermside Army Camp was primarily responsible for building the Allied Works Council approved defence sites across Brisbane’s northern suburbs.

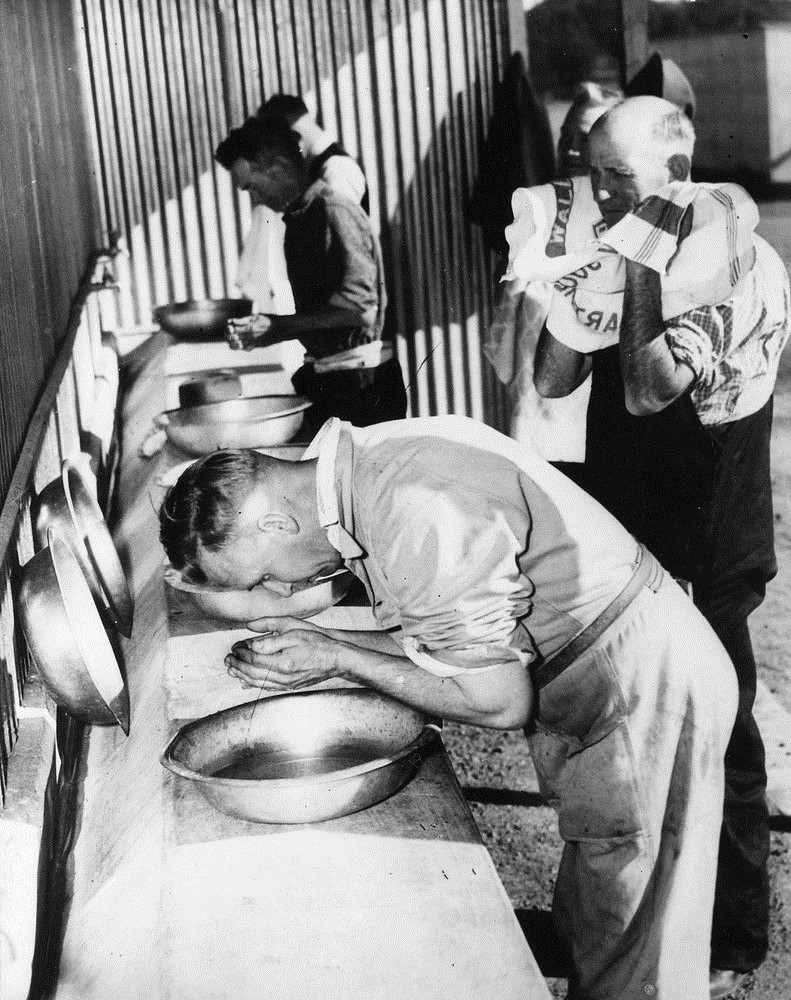
Depicting the facilities at a CCC camp in Victoria.

=== Civilian Service Medal ===
Members who served in the CCC had the opportunity to receive the Civilian Service Medal, along with any members under the Allied Works Council across the years 1939-1945. This medal was specifically designed to appreciate the civilians that serviced in onerous conditions to support the war effort in Australia.

== Legacy ==
The CCC played a vital role in creating the airport network in Australia that is still being used today. Whilst the goal of building aerodromes and runways was to do so quickly and most efficiently with inexpensive materials, the CCC helped build the foundation for 138 runways that are still in use today.

== Deaths and abolishment ==
The abolishment of the CCC was not under public spotlight by any means, rather the remaining members were transferred to the Commonwealth Department of Works and Housing. The entirety of the CCC was abolished by 1 July 1946.
