= Eddie Oribin =

Australian architect

Edwin Henry (Eddie) Oribin (1927 – 2016) was an Australian architect who practised in Cairns, Queensland, Australia. A number of his works are now heritage-listed.

== Early life ==
Edwin Henry (Eddie) Oribin was born in Cairns in 1927. As a teenager during World War II, he spent time in Brisbane where he obtained work with the Allison Aircraft Division of General Motors rebuilding aircraft engines.

== Architectural career ==
Returning to Cairns in 1944, Oribin commenced architectural training with Sidney George Barnes, Chief Architect of the Allied Works Council for North Queensland, whose training gave Oribin a solid grounding in structural design and construction. In 1950 Oribin moved to Brisbane to work and study, and on 10 February 1953 he obtained his registration as an architect in Queensland, returning to Cairns the following month to begin a partnership with Barnes. This partnership lasted until Barnes' death in 1959, after which Oribin continued practicing on his own.

Oribin undertook a wide range of work in North Queensland between 1953 and 1973. Throughout his career, he was devoted to experimenting with different structural and aesthetic ideas, drawing inspiration from a wide variety of Australian and international publications. Characteristics of Oribin's work included meticulous detailing, structural creativity and concern for the modulation of light. He was also known for his model-making skills and superb craftsmanship, often creating objects himself.

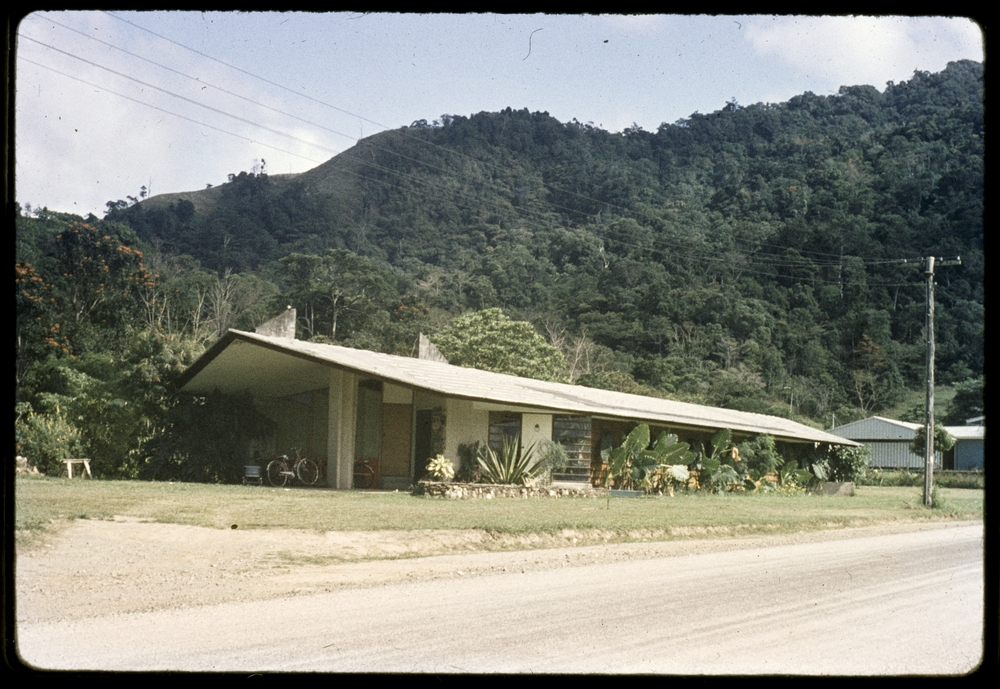
Oribin House, 1963

In the late 1950s Oribin chose to construct his first house (and later studio) in a new post-war suburban area on the slopes of Mount Whitfield, north-west of the Cairns CBD. This land, encompassing most of the present-day suburbs of Whitfield and Edge Hill, was first surveyed in 1883. Separated from the main township by low-lying swamp land, the lower slopes of Mount Whitfield were one of the few elevated areas of land available in Cairns, with views over Trinity Bay. Over time, the area was developed as agricultural land and sugarcane farms. One of these farms was owned by William Collins (Mayor of Cairns from 1927 to 1949), who built a large house known as Sylvan Brook on a hill. From the 1950s the Collins' land was subdivided in stages for housing development and in 1973 the suburb of Whitfield was formally declared.

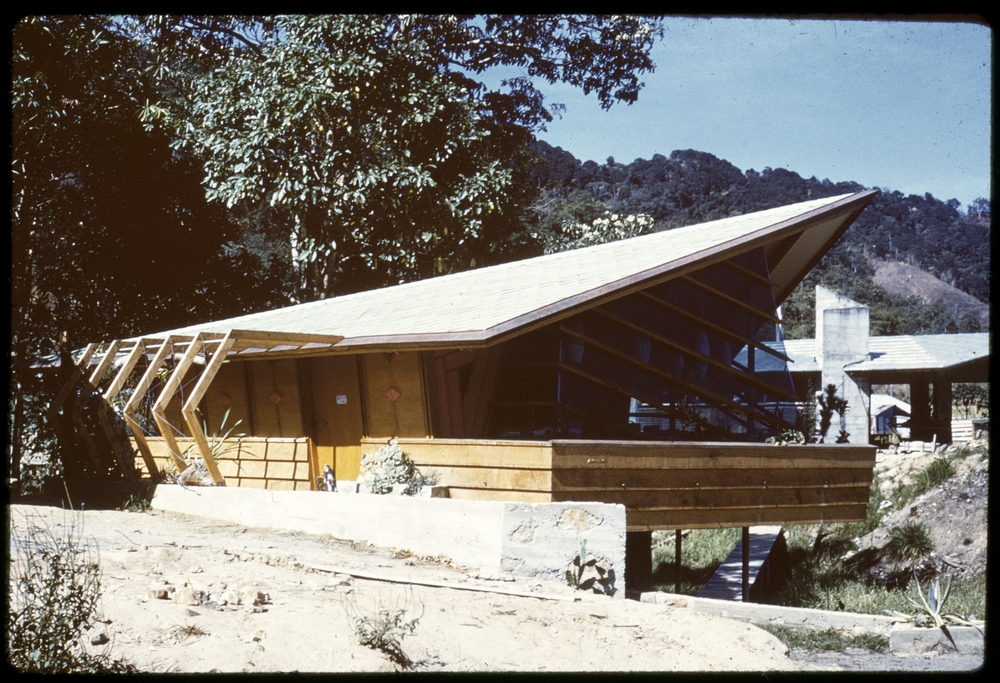
Oribin Studio, 1963

In late 1957 Eddie Oribin and his wife Joyce purchased two adjoining lots in a new subdivision, one of which had several unusual features, being much larger in size than neighbouring lots and irregularly shaped, with an acutely angled corner at the intersection of Heavey and Mullins streets. A small creek protected by an easement ran through the property, cutting off the south-western corner. These site conditions played a key role in determining the siting and orientation of the house (constructed in 1958) and studio.

As an architect and designer, Oribin was particularly influenced by the works of Frank Lloyd Wright (1867–1959), a famous and widely published American architect who practiced from the late 1880s until his death in 1959. Over his long career, Wright had a major influence on American architecture and designed some of its most famous buildings, such as the Robie House, Chicago (1908–10), Falling Water, Pennsylvania (1937–39) and the Guggenheim Museum, New York (1959). He is also famous for his leading role in developing the Prairie School style and his ideas about "organic" architecture. Organic architecture can be briefly defined as an architecture that is both visually and environmentally compatible, closely integrated with the site, and which reflects the architect's concern with the processes of nature and the forms they produce. Buildings designed to this philosophy made use of local materials, responded to the local topography and climate to produce comfortable conditions, and were organised so as to form an organic, integrated whole.

Through publications such as newspapers and architecture journals, Wright's influence spread around the world. Early proponents of his style in Australia were Chicago-based architects Walter Burley Griffin and his wife Marion Mahony Griffin, famous for winning the international competition to design the city of Canberra (1912), who had worked for Frank Lloyd Wright in America. Several young Australian architects influenced by Wright were designing in an organic idiom in the 1950s, particularly in the southern states, but it was not until the 1960s that there were enough examples of organic architecture for an organic style to be discernible in Australia. A 1969 journal article, which included Oribin's first house as an example, displayed the wide variety of forms, materials and interpretations of organic philosophy that were employed by Australian architects, with features such as clearly expressed timber structure, textured brickwork, free massing and complex geometries that complemented natural elements of the site.

In 1959 Oribin designed his Oribin Studio separate from his house from which to run his solo architecture practice. Like his first house, designing the studio was an opportunity for Oribin to put into practice his most creative and technical ambitions and create a working environment that suited his needs, with a large, well lit office and service and storage areas. In common with other architect's personal projects, the studio was also a showpiece of Oribin's skills and design philosophies.

Construction was completed in 1960 and the studio served as Oribin's personal drawing office until 1973. Located on the opposite side of the creek in the south-west corner of the property, the studio was a small, two-storey timber and concrete building, accessed by a timber walkway connecting it to the house. The studio layout consisted of a two rooms on the upper floor that were used as the drawing office, with built-in desks lining the edges of the main south-east facing glazed walls. The ground floor was partially enclosed with concrete walls and used as a carport.

Drawing inspiration from Wright, Oribin adapted the Wright's concept for his Unitarian Meeting House to the Whitfield site and the Cairns climate, utilising local materials. Like Wright's design, the studio was designed to a triangular module, in this case using a 30°/60° grid that fans out towards the south-east. The building was raised up on a concrete and stone base, above the potential flood levels of the adjacent creek, with the access walkway from the house passing beneath the cantilevered studio and up a series of concrete steps on the southern and western sides. The heaviness of the concrete structure, which features large random stones, provided a visual anchor to the soaring characteristics of the studio above. Glazed walls with diagonal glazing bars angled back from a weatherboard "prow" and a sheet metal-clad roof with pointed ends and deep eaves sailed over the whole structure. Side casement windows, protected by shutters, provided cross-ventilation and surrounding trees and vegetation helped shade the studio as they grew. The glazed walls of the drawing office provided good, consistent daylight and views towards the house and Heavey Crescent.

Other Oribin buildings that display a similar angular "Wrightian" influence upon their design are two of his churches, the Mareeba Methodist Church (1960) and St Andrew's Memorial Presbyterian Church, Innisfail (1960); both are highly detailed, utilise unusual and creative structural methods, and carry through triangle and diamond motifs to all aspects of the design.

During Oribin's years working from the studio he designed many houses for clients in the suburbs surrounding Mount Whitfield, each very different in structure and form. He also designed a library in the suburb of Stratford (1969, demolished c. 2008), two motel projects, including the Hides Hotel-Motel extension in Lake Street, Cairns (1967), and several large commercial projects in collaboration with other architects, such as the Cairns Civic Theatre (1972–74).

In 1971 the Oribins subdivided their property into three lots; one lot containing the house, another the studio, and a third was created from the vacant land on the corner of Mullins Street and Heavey Crescent. These were sold between 1972 and 1973.

== Later life ==
Oribin closed his architecture practice in 1973 and the family moved into a new house designed by Oribin at Edge Hill, completed in 1974. This second house was more radical with an elevated living room opening directly to an encircling garden.

In 1986–1987 Oribin built his third family home in Stanthorpe, Queensland, as a series of three connected Japanese-style pavilions. He used laminated plywood to create a series of concave roof and convex ceilings. As with his consideration of climate in his North Queensland buildings, Oribin used innovative approaches to insulation and heating to his first cooler climate home.

In 1997, aged 70 years, Oribin designed and hand-built a new home in Torrington, New South Wales, as a 50th wedding anniversary present to his wife Joyce. The house on a boulder-strewn site and features steeply-gabled central living areas with clerestory windows. The bedroom has a north-facing solium shaped as a tube.

Oribin died of cancer in May 2016, aged 89.

== Legacy ==
Oribin's significant contribution to Queensland architecture was recognised by the Queensland Chapter of the Royal Australian Institute of Architects in 2000, when the new 'Building of the Year' award for the Far North Region was named in his honour. In 2013 the Oribin House and Studio received the Robin Gibson Enduring Architecture Award at the Australian Institute of Architects' Queensland Architecture Awards.

The Fryer Library at the University of Queensland holds an open-access collection of 160 architectural drawings for 21 of Orbin's buildings designed between 1956 and 1997. The designs include residential buildings (including all of Orbin's own homes), church buildings and commercial and public buildings.
