= St Andrew's Presbyterian Memorial Church, Innisfail =

St Andrew's Presbyterian Memorial Church (former)
- St Andrew's Uniting Memorial Church (former)
- St Andrew's Presbyterian Church (former)
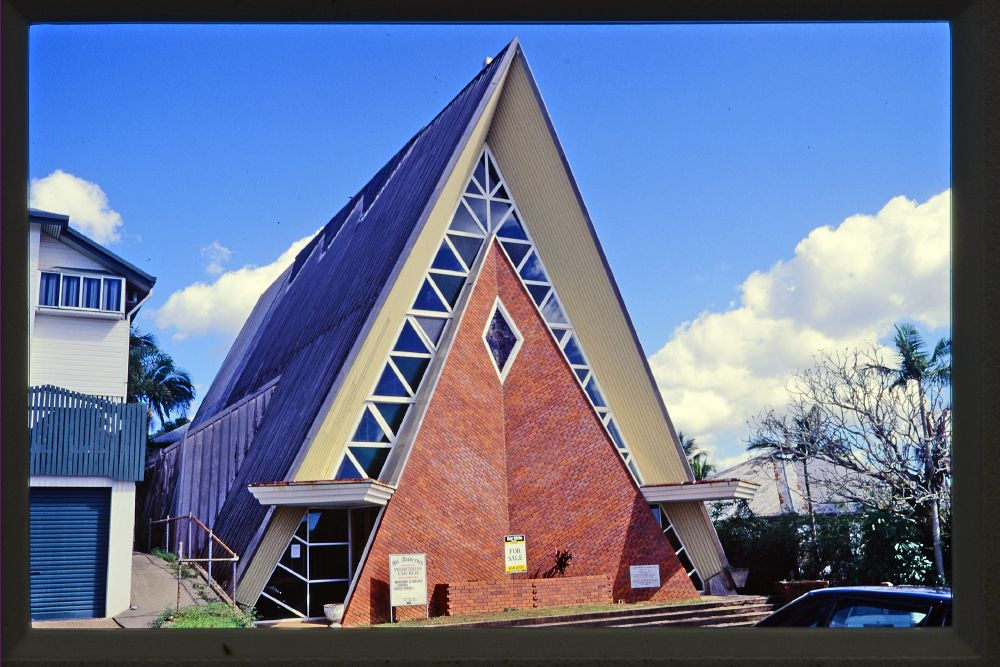
- The former St Andrew's Presbyterian Memorial Church, 2003
- St Andrew's Presbyterian Memorial Church (former)
- 17°31′11″S 146°01′45″E
- Address: 114 Rankin Street, Innisfail, Cassowary Coast Region, Queensland
- Country: Australia
- Previous denomination: Presbyterian (1961–1977); Uniting (1977–1986)

History
- Status: Church (former)
- Dedication: To the Glory of God in memory of lives lost in WWI, WWII and the Korean War
- Dedicated: 4 November 1961 by Rev. A. L. McKay

Architecture
- Functional status: Church closed and sold
- Architects: Eddie Oribin; Sidney George Barnes
- Architectural type: Church (former)
- Style: Modernist organic
- Completed: 1961
- Construction cost: A£18,000
- Closed: 1 February 1986 due to Cyclone Winifred

Specifications
- Capacity: 200 people

Queensland Heritage Register
- Official name: St Andrew's Presbyterian Memorial Church; St Andrew's Presbyterian Church
- Type: State heritage (built)
- Designated: 12 December 2003
- Reference no.: 602332
- Significant period: 1960s (historical); 1960s (fabric) ongoing (social)
- Significant components: Stained glass window/s, church, church hall/sunday school hall
- Builders: Andrew George Pepper

St Andrew's Presbyterian Memorial Church is a heritage-listed former Presbyterian and Uniting church at 114 Rankin Street, Innisfail, Cassowary Coast Region, Queensland, Australia. The former church was designed by Eddie Oribin and built in 1961 by Andrew George Pepper in the Modernist organic style and was also known as St Andrew's Presbyterian Church. The former church was added to the Queensland Heritage Register on 12 December 2003.

The former church was described as "the isoscelean masterpiece of an ever-resourceful maverick architect".

Significantly damaged in January 1986 by Severe Tropical Cyclone Winifred, the church building was sold by the Uniting Church to the Johnstone Shire Council in exchange for a block of land to construct a new Uniting church. In c. 1988 the Presbyterian Church of Queensland acquired the Rankin Street former church property.

The building is located opposite the Innisfail Hospital.

== History ==
The former St Andrew's Memorial Church is a striking, A-frame building erected on Rankin Street to the design of far North Queensland architect, Eddie H Oribin. It was constructed for the Presbyterian community of Innisfail in 1961 on the site of, and incorporating part of, an earlier church building. Its innovative design makes a significant contribution to the townscape of Innisfail.

=== First church building ===
Prior to the first regular Presbyterian Church service conducted in the old Court House in October 1913, Innisfail's monthly services were conducted in the Oddfellows Hall in Owen Street by Mr Charles Fixter, who travelled from Miriwinni.

The first committee meeting was held January 1914 and during 1916 the present church site was purchased from Mary Graham. After a £500 bequest was left by Peter Margach for the building fund it was decided that a church should be built. The church construction was commenced early in 1918 but the framework was flattened during a cyclone in March. The building contractor, Frank Robson, replaced the framework and the church was completed and officially opened in November 1918. In 1925, the ground under the church was excavated and a concrete hall built by Peter Van Leeuwen, made possible from another bequest of £499 from Mary Kate Margach. This hall, 11.0 by 7.9 metres (36 ft × 26 ft), was later enlarged by an additional 7.3 metres (24 ft) and formed the foundation of the new building.

=== Second church building ===
In 1959, a successful stewardship campaign was conducted in which the people pledged to support the church, and as a result, it was decided to proceed with the erection of a church to the Glory of God and as a memorial to those who had paid the supreme sacrifice in World War I, World War II and the Korean War.

The church was designed in 1959 by Eddie H. Oribin while in association with Sidney George Barnes. Oribin was born in Cairns in 1927. In 1953 he became a registered architect and formed a partnership with Barnes in Cairns, where they undertook residential and commercial work and church commissions. After Barnes' death in 1959, Oribin continued his work until 1973 when the office was closed down. Other churches designed by Oribin include the Gordonvale Church of England, St Paul's Anglican Church in Proserpine and the Mareeba Methodist Church.

The former St Andrew's Presbyterian Memorial Church at Innisfail was designed to incorporate part of the concrete floor and walls of the old church erected in 1918, which housed the Sunday School kindergarten. Plans for the new church were submitted to the Presbytery by Rev. Andrew Leslie McKay of St Andrew's Presbyterian Church, Cairns, following approval by the Innisfail congregation. The cost estimate was A£18,000 with furnishings to cost £2,000.

Tendering for the new church opened on 2 November 1959, closing on 29 January 1960. The successful contractor was local builder A. G. Pepper. On the 18 May 1960 a new addenda was issued altering the design of the rear wall. Originally Oribin had intended a full-length laminated cross extending from the apex to the ground within a glazed diamond gridded frame. Particular grids were to be infilled with hexagonally shaped sashes and small triangular panels of coloured glass. The replacement of the rear wall design was intended to be temporary to alleviate costs and was to be eventually rebuilt as designed - a priority subordinated by the damages requiring repair following Severe Tropical Cyclone Winifred.

The building was opened and the memorial tablet unveiled on 4 November 1961 by Rev A. L. McKay as Moderator of the newly formed Presbytery of Carpentaria (separated from the Presbytery of Townsville in August that year). The building as reported in the local press at the time was in the form of a traditional tent, constructed of fabricated steel "A" frames with the main church floor being supported on the cross arm of the "A" with the hall below. The exterior of the building was completely roofed from apex to ground with ribbed aluminium sheeting with three dormer windows on each side for light and ventilation. The seating capacity of the church was 200 with additional choir seating of 30 and the new hall was almost doubled in size.

All materials used in the building were purchased locally or through local agents and all work carried out was by the local tradesmen. The church furnishings comprised 24 silky oak polished pews, maple communion table and chairs, polished lectern, marble baptismal font and a polished maple, plate glass sliding door hymn book press. Installed on the choir floor was a double manual Hammond electric organ with tone cabinet and book rests for the choir. Internally the building was lined with diagonally sheeted tulip oaks walls in a natural finish, polished Johnstone River hardwood floor in the church with blue carpeting the full length of the center aisle, and blue rubber flooring to all staircases.

The chancel end of the church featured a patterned screen wall with green glass inserts and a softly illuminated gold finished cross surmounting a polished copper flower bowl. Natural light was provided by triangular side dormer windows positioned between the main trusses, triangular front windows surrounding a triangular brickwork panel and three triangular tinted fibreglass rooflights. By night it was lit by indirect fluorescent lights housed in pelmets along the side wall and spot lights in the lighting baffles at the apex.

The hall was furnished with laminate covered kitchen cabinets and lit with fluorescent lighting. The minister's vestry was located at the north-west corner with polished table, chairs and telephone. An open side vestibule located below the three dormer windows to the northern side of the nave completes the ground floor and is suitable for entrance to the building in wet weather.

In 1976–1977, the Congregational, Methodist and Presbyterian Churches amalgamated as the Uniting Church in Australia. This formally changed the title of the former church from Presbyterian to Uniting Church. On 1 February 1986, Cyclone Winifred crossed the Queensland coast causing damage to the former church and forcing the congregation to attend services at the East Innisfail State Primary School while the proceeds from fundraising were put towards church repairs. However, rather than repair the former church, the cost of which was estimated as extremely high, the Uniting Church gave the building to the Johnstone Shire Council in exchange for a block of land in Scullen Avenue. Using the insurance money collected as a result of the cyclone damage, the congregation erected a new church on this site.

When the Uniting Church finally moved to their newly constructed church in Scullen Avenue, mobile items including the pews, cross and altar were moved also. The Oribin-designed former church remained unused until 1988, when a separate Presbyterian congregation, which had separated from the Uniting Church, approached the council to purchase it. Repairs to the former church were undertaken by the new congregation through fundraising and voluntary labour, utilizing many sources from Cairns to Innisfail. The largest challenge was repairing the damage to the roof and internal ceiling sheeting incurred during Cyclone Winifred. At this period the illuminated cross which had been located on the roof ridge almost 20 metres (66 ft) above the ground, was removed due to maintenance difficulties. Its whereabouts is unknown.

As of 2016, the building was occupied by a real estate agent.

=== Subsequent sales ===
The church was sold in March 2021 for $395,000. In October 2023, the former church and its Queenslander-style manse at the rear on a 1,012-square-metre (10,890 sq ft) site was offered for sale again.

== Description ==
The former St Andrew's Presbyterian Church is located on a cut and fill platform on a sloping site on the western side of Rankin Street overlooking the Johnstone River. Rankin Street contains several important civic buildings including the Town Hall and the Catholic Church and the hospital. At the time of its inspection for heritage listing, the former church was as described in the local press at its opening ceremony with the exception of some minor changes to the ground floor and the removal of furniture.

The former St Andrew's Presbyterian Memorial Church is of A-frame design with a rectangular plan form and is located well above street level, accessed by stairs punctuated by large diamond shaped planter boxes. Pairs of doors under large suspended, tiered awnings provide entry to the church either side of the eastern wall. The eastern wall is of a folded triangular form with bricks laid on the diagonal, housed within a triangulated band of perimeter windows and decorated with a diamond shaped leadlight window with a burning tree motif. The western wall houses sash windows to the kitchen and sanctuary and is clad in timber cabin mould chamfer boards.

The steeply pitched roof of the building is clad in ribbed aluminium sheeting with three dormer windows on the north and south sides between the trusses. Where the roof meets the ground, large concrete footings or stormwater drains and planter boxes form the transition. Three triangular roof lights are positioned above the dormer windows at the apex.

The lobby occupies the eastern end of the building where a pair of symmetrical staircases against the side walls lead to the former church above and the mezzanine floor for the choir above that. At ground level, access to the hall is via a single, central door opening. The hall is a single volume with an open kitchen at its western end. It has high level windows on the southern boundary and pairs of French doors opening onto the open vestibule along its northern side. The stairs to the chancel and the former vestry (converted to toilet facilities) are located at the northwestern corner of this floor. The eastern end of the open vestibule has been more recently enclosed to form a new vestry. The hall floor is a painted concrete slab; the ceiling is lined with battened fibrous cement sheeting, revealing the timber floor structure for the former church above.

The walls of the former church are lined with vertically jointed tongue and groove tulip oak boards laid diagonally, radiating out from the apex with center infill panels at the intersection in a dark stained sheet material. Lighting pelmets lining the side walls are decorated with a triangular motif and have triangular cut outs in the base to allow light to wash both up and down the walls. Suspended lighting baffles at the apex filter light from the roof lights above. The chancel has a screen, altar, lectern and planter that also incorporate triangular forms. Behind the screen is a single flight of stairs to the ground floor.

The original furniture (including pews and communion table) has been removed to the present Innisfail Uniting Church and the original royal blue carpet and rubber matting (representing the corporate colour of the former Presbyterian Church) has been replaced.

A manse is located at the rear of the site and is accessed from a driveway along the northern boundary of the property. It has a rectangular plan form and is highset on stumps and framed, clad and lined in timber. It has a hipped corrugated iron roof and enclosed, encircling verandahs. The manse is leased as a private residence and was not inspected in detail. It is not considered to contribute to the cultural heritage significance of the place.

== Heritage listing ==
The former St Andrew's Presbyterian Memorial Church was listed on the Queensland Heritage Register on 12 December 2003 having satisfied the following criteria.

The place is important in demonstrating the evolution or pattern of Queensland's history.

Located on the site of and incorporating the first Presbyterian Church in Innisfail, the former St Andrew's Presbyterian Memorial Church demonstrates the pattern of development of the Presbyterian community in the region and the commitment to memorialise war dead.

The place is important because of its aesthetic significance.

The former St Andrew's Presbyterian Memorial Church at Innisfail has aesthetic significance as an outstanding and distinctive example of the use of local timbers and craftsmanship in a design reflecting the worldwide influence of the work of American architect Frank Lloyd Wright's ideas on organic architecture. As a tall, A-frame building located on the crest of a ridge overlooking the Johnstone River, the former St Andrew's Presbyterian Church is a landmark in Innisfail.

The place is important in demonstrating a high degree of creative or technical achievement at a particular period.

It also has association with far north Queensland architect Eddie H. Oribin as an intact example of his innovative work.

The place has a strong or special association with a particular community or cultural group for social, cultural or spiritual reasons.

The former St Andrew's Presbyterian Memorial Church is valued by the community for its townscape and memorial significance.

The place has a special association with the life or work of a particular person, group or organisation of importance in Queensland's history.

It also has association with far north Queensland architect Eddie H. Oribin as an intact example of his work.
