= Allied Works Council =

Former Australian government organization

The Allied Works Council was an organisation set up to oversee and organise military construction works in Australia during World War II.

Established on 25 February 1942, with their first offices in Melbourne, the Allied Works Council was responsible for carrying out any works required by the Allied Forces including providing any equipment, materials or workmen required to carry out these works. By 30 June 1943 they had 4,609 administrative and technical staff and an enrolment in the Civil Constructional Corps of 66,274 and 2,521 in the Civil Alien Corps which was made up primarily of Italian internees. In these roles they were considered 'enemy aliens' and 'prisoners of war'.

Edward Granville Theodore, a former Premier of Queensland (1919–1925) and Federal Treasurer (1929–1931), was appointed Director-General of the council. Following the war, the work of the council evolved into the Ministry for Works.
