= Barron Valley Hotel =

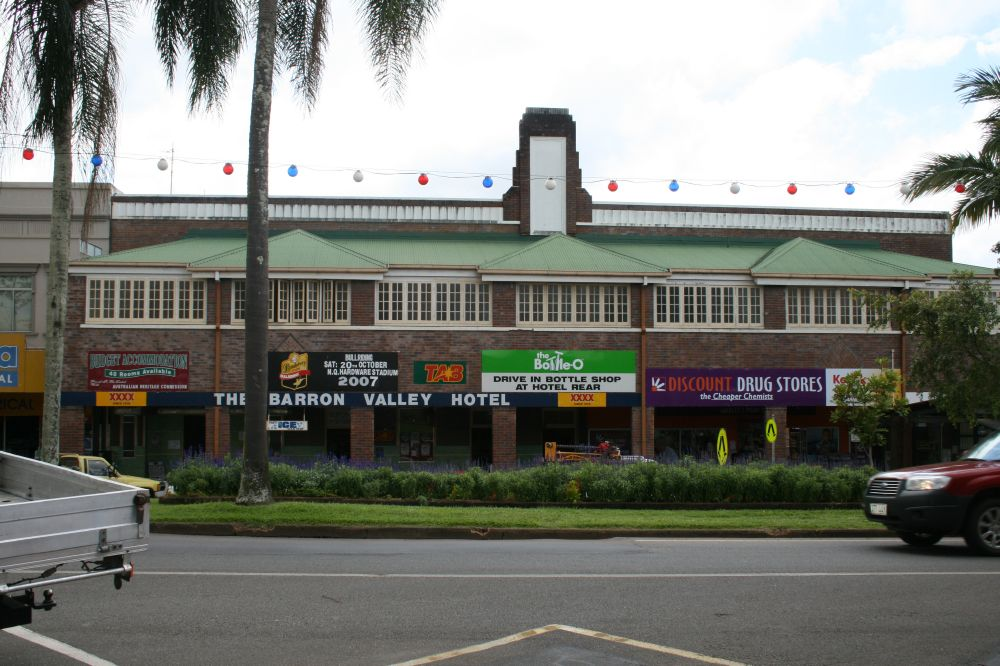
- Barron Valley Hotel

- Location within Queensland Location within Australia
- 17.2652°S 145.4759°E
- Location: 53 Main Street, Atherton, Tablelands Region, Queensland, Australia

History
- Design period: 1939–1945 (World War II)
- Built: 1940–1941

Site notes
- Architect: Hill & Taylor
- Architectural style: Art Deco

Queensland Heritage Register
- Official name: Barron Valley Hotel
- Type: state heritage (built)
- Designated: 5 February 2010
- Reference no.: 602587
- Significant period: 1940s onwards
- Significant components: bar, hotel / inn, shop/s

Barron Valley Hotel is a heritage-listed hotel at 53 Main Street, Atherton, Tablelands Region, Queensland, Australia. It was designed by Hill & Taylor and built from 1940 to 1941. It was added to the Queensland Heritage Register on 5 February 2010.

== History ==
The Barron Valley Hotel was constructed in 1940–1941 and is located on the main street of Atherton. The site has been used continuously for hotel and accommodation purposes since 1890 and illustrates the role played by early hotels in the development and expansion of regional settlements. The present hotel, with its distinctive streamlined decorative detailing in the interior public spaces, has been run by the Nasser family for over 70 years.

Early European settlements on the Atherton Tablelands developed along the route from Port Douglas to the Herberton at Granite Creek near Mareeba, Rocky Creek near Atherton and Scrubby Creek near Carrington. Atherton, which takes its name from pastoralist John Atherton, was originally known as Prior's Pocket after Thomas Prior, a timber getter who was the first European to camp there permanently. The settlement grew to shelter men engaged in lumbering operations, including four brothers from the Mazlin family who played a key role in the local timber industry; much of the timber they cut was used to construct Atherton's early buildings.

The town was surveyed in 1885 by surveyor Falcone Hutten and the first town lots were sold in Atherton on 23 February 1886. From the mid-1890s Atherton's popularity as a settlement increased and it became firmly established as the main centre on the Tablelands. During the first years of settlement Atherton was also a staging post for Cobb and Co Coaches, which stopped at the Barron Valley Hotel on their way between Herberton and Port Douglas. Atherton provided the surrounding mining population with the bulk of its produce and its importance as a regional centre was cemented by the arrival of the railway from Cairns in 1903. The railway was located behind the Barron Valley Hotel and eventually replaced the Cobb and Co. routes through to Herberton.

Thomas Peake's original Barron Valley Hotel - a shack beside the track to Herberton - was built in the 1890s. It was soon replaced by a single-storeyed hotel, which was also a Cobb & Co. way station and general store. In 1907–1908 it was rebuilt as a two-storeyed timber hotel, which became a feature of early life in Atherton and was a meeting place for all manner of occasions. Mr McCraw was the first licensee of this third hotel on the site and it became known as McCraw's Barron Valley Hotel.

Sconder (Alexander) Nasser, a Lebanese migrant whose family had emigrated from Kousba to Clermont in Queensland in the late nineteenth century, took over the ownership of the hotel in 1930. A number of Lebanese (Syrian) migrants settled in North Queensland pre-1900 and in the early twentieth century, particularly in coastal regions such as Innisfail and in the North West such as Charters Towers. Most worked as traders or shopkeepers but did not settle in dense communities. The Nasser family arranged a marriage between Sconder and Amelia Moses, from a Lebanese family based in Atherton, in 1912. Initially Sconder and Amelia returned to work in Clermont, but moved north after the disastrous 1916 Clermont floods. Initially they both worked at the Moses-owned Exchange Hotel (destroyed 1933 and rebuilt as the Grand Hotel) in Atherton. Prior to purchasing the Barron Valley Hotel, Nasser ran the town's first taxi service, operated a barber shop and built the first motor car garage in Atherton.

In the late 1930s Nasser decided to replace the two-storeyed timber hotel with a more substantial structure and engaged prominent Cairns architects Richard Hill and AJH Taylor to design it. Hill & Taylor, in partnership 1927–c. 1940 and 1945–1952, designed a number of prominent north Queensland civic buildings between the first and second world wars, including the Cairns City Council Chambers (1929–1930), Cairns Post Office (1930), Johnstone Shire Hall in Innisfail (1935–1938), Mossman Shire Hall (1936), and a number of country hospitals, including Mossman District Hospital (c. 1930) and Proserpine Hospital (1939–1940). This association with Hill and Taylor, as well as the distinctive interior detailing, underpinned the hotel's listing as a significant example of 20th century Queensland architecture by the Royal Australian Institute of Architects in 2005.

The new Barron Valley Hotel was a two-storeyed brick building which featured 30 bedrooms, a billiards parlour, two bars, and a lounge and dining room separated by decorative leadlight folding doors, which could be opened to create one large dance hall or ballroom accommodating up to 250 dancers. A barber's shop opened directly to the street. The hotel was opened on Saturday 12 July 1941 with a dance. At the time of opening the interior was described as being dignified and up-to-date with deep cream and gold walls and polished timber floors.

In 1942, during World War II, the Commander-in-Chief of the Australian Military Forces, General Sir Thomas Blamey, investigated using the Atherton and Evelyn Tablelands as a base for rehabilitating and training troops. Four officers made a thorough examination of the area, where already more than 5,000 troops were located, and selected a number of sites in the relatively dry western belt of the Tableland. They recommended that only two divisions be placed on the Tableland in view of the limitations imposed by the wet season, water supply and communications. The Tablelands were within easy reach of the battlefields of New Guinea and the climate gave the troops respite from the tropical heat of the coast and assisted in the convalescence of sick and wounded soldiers. The Tablelands also provided access to a training area similar to that of the South East Asian environment.

The establishment of the Tablelands Base Area in 1942 created a constant flow of Army traffic through Atherton's main street. Many of Atherton's buildings housed both Australian and American forces. The School of Arts building was taken over by the Red Cross, and the Girl Guides hall by the Australian Army for use as its historical section, while the Sharples Theatre became an Army Canteen. The Military took over the Atherton Showground and remained there for three years, building the Merriland Hall defence canteen. The Barron Valley Hotel was requisitioned by the Australian Army as an officers club, mess hall and accommodation for two and a half years. For a few months before moving to Port Moresby, General Blamey made the hotel his base.

In 1945, Sconder's son Harold returned from three years military service and took over the running of the hotel. He retired from running the hotel in 1990 and the next generation of the family took over. In 2009 Harold's son Michael and his wife Maree are still the licensees and Harold's other son, David, runs the adjoining but detached bottle shop. Under Michael Nasser's ownership, the hotel underwent a major refurbishment between 2002 and 2007, which included: replacing the old iron roof; installing wheelchair access to a new deck and dining area; developing new men's and disabled bathroom facilities; upgrading the kitchen; and restoring the early furniture.

The Barron Valley Hotel has played an important role in providing accommodation for businesspersons, visitors and tourists to the Tablelands and has been promoted in tourism brochure over many years, including the 1949 Cairns, Innisfail & Atherton Tableland Visitors Directory. As Atherton's leading hotel the Barron Valley has provided accommodation for distinguished visitors including several Queensland governors. Its dining room/lounge have been used regularly for meetings, conferences and social functions. Local sporting clubs and community groups have been supported by the owners of the hotel and have a close association with the place.

== Description ==
The Barron Valley Hotel is a large, two-storeyed hotel of brick and concrete construction with a metal sheeted roof. It is located in the heart of the central business district of Atherton, on the north- western side of Main Street on the Kennedy Highway. Its allotment extends through to Railway Lane which runs adjacent to the Cairns Railway. The hotel is rectangular in plan comprising four wings built around a central courtyard and each wing has an external enclosed verandah and internal open verandah on both levels. Parapets to the outer walls conceal the main roof from exterior view.

The enclosed verandah which overhangs the Main Street footpath is the principal feature of the facade and is supported at the kerb line by piers constructed of bullnosed bricks. Above a solid brick balustrade, decorated with three diamond patterns of diagonal brickwork, a continuous rendered masonry sill underlines seven banks of eight-light casement windows between the brick piers. The verandah roof, clad in metal sheeting, has multiple hips that project over alternate banks of windows. The brick parapet with rendered capping is accentuated by a horizontal band of decorative render and a central vertical projection formed with stepped brickwork.

The rear and side boundary walls, constructed of a concrete frame with contrasting dark brown brick infill balustrading and parapet, form the outer verandah walls. The verandahs are enclosed with windows (both early timber casement and later sliding aluminium sashes). The northern corner at the rear of the hotel projects forward and above the parapet and has a decorative rendered cornice.

At street level the front of the hotel (south-east wing) retains its early black skirting tile and fine bands of horizontal cream tiles dividing green wall tiles. The recessed main entrance, in the southern corner, is tiled to door height and the tiling extends as a dado along the remainder of the hotel frontage. Above the entrance doors and adjacent narrow windows, a glazed sign with metallic trim bears the name of the hotel in large stylised lettering. The underside of the verandah is lined with flat sheet and decorated with a stylised pattern of timber battens.

The main entrance opens into the foyer which has an intact interior featuring a decorative plaster ceiling and cornice, polished timber floors and timber joinery including wall and counter panelling with inlaid timber detailing, a main stair, reception area and early furniture. The public bar, adjacent private bar and the main lounge open off the foyer.

The public bar with two entrance doors from Main Street and a window between, features early cream tiled walls with black tile detailing to complement the inlaid timber panelling in the foyer and an early terrazzo floor and bar with later laminate counter. North of the public bar, a passageway from the street provides additional access to the public bar as well as the central courtyard and an adjacent tenancy. A pharmacy, with a recent fitout and shopfront, occupies a large proportion of the eastern corner of the ground floor and was formerly the billiards saloon. In the eastern corner, a small, intact barber's shop has an early shopfront, early fixtures and vertical tongue and groove boarded interior lining.

In the south-west wing, the lounge opens off the entrance foyer through veneer doors that match the wall panelling and is separated from the dining room in the western corner by leadlight bi-fold doors. The lounge has an open fireplace and both lounge and dining rooms have polished timber floors and decorative plaster cornice and ceilings. Both the lounge and dining rooms have eight light doors that open onto external and internal verandahs. Adjoining the dining room area is a private dining room and the hotel kitchen which form the north-west wing.

The courtyard is used as an outdoor lounge/dining area and has shade sails supported on a new veranda which runs along the north side of the lounge and the east side of the kitchen and private dining room. An open passageway behind the north-east wing (pharmacy) provides external access to the courtyard.

The upper level houses the hotel's accommodation of approximately 30 bedrooms. The main access to this level is from the entrance foyer and there are secondary stairs within the courtyard and on the external verandah in the north-west wing. Each wing of the building has a central corridor with bedrooms either side that have access either to the internal or external verandahs. A sun deck has been constructed within the south-eastern end of the courtyard void. There are four communal bathrooms and in the north-east and north-west wings, a number of bedrooms have been converted to ensuites for adjoining bedrooms. In the north-west wing there is a larger room for family accommodation in the northern corner and a communal lounge in the western corner. The corridors have plastered and painted walls and polished timber floors. The bathroom in the north-eastern wing has early tiling and fixtures.

The large enclosed verandah extending over the footpath houses recreation areas and a meeting room divided with single-skin timber framed partition walls. The ceiling is lined with flat sheet and finished with timber cover battens in a stylised pattern.

In the grounds behind the hotel facing Railway Lane is a detached bottle shop which is a later addition and is not considered to be of cultural heritage significance.

== Heritage listing ==
Barron Valley Hotel was listed on the Queensland Heritage Register on 5 February 2010 having satisfied the following criteria.

The place is important in demonstrating the evolution or pattern of Queensland's history.

The Barron Valley Hotel at Atherton, the principal town of the Atherton Tableland, was designed in 1939 and constructed 1940–1941. It is the fourth hotel on the site since 1890 and one of three large, substantially intact hotels on the Tableland – the other two being the Lake Eacham Hotel (1910–1911 extended 1926) at Yungaburra and the Malanda Hotel (c. 1910) at Malanda – that have contributed significantly to the development of the region. The large Barron Valley Hotel has accommodated visitors to the region, including dignitaries, officials and tourists, and has provided a popular meeting venue and social and recreational focus for Atherton and district since the 1940s.

The Barron Valley Hotel is important for its historical association with the Atherton Tableland as a base for allied training and rehabilitation during World War II, being requisitioned for about two and a half years during 1942–1944 as the Australian Army's officers' club, mess hall and accommodation, and providing briefly a home to General Sir Thomas Blamey, Commander-in-Chief of the Australian Military Forces.

Constructed for Sconder Nasser in 1940–1941 on the site of the previous Barron Valley Hotel which he acquired in 1930, the present Barron Valley Hotel is still owned and occupied by the Nasser family and exemplifies the contribution made by Lebanese immigrants to the development of regional Queensland.

The place is important in demonstrating the principal characteristics of a particular class of cultural places.

The Barron Valley Hotel is notable amongst Queensland hotels of the late 1930s/early 1940s for the integrity of its layout and the intactness and quality of its interior, which employs a variety of decorative applied design elements and materials popular at the time of its construction. The main entrance foyer and staircase, which display a lavish use of North Queensland timbers in streamlined decorative finishes, fixtures and early furniture, are particularly fine.

The place is important in demonstrating the principal characteristics of a substantial "Art Deco" hotel of the late 1930s/early 1940s in a regional centre, retaining:

- its original form and function
- early street presence
- early configuration with upper floor accommodation, public spaces on the ground floor (including entrance foyer, lounge, dining room, public bar, private bar and former billiards room – the latter occupied by a retail pharmacy in 2009) and barber's shop opening directly to the street
- extensive early finishes, fittings and fixtures, including: the timber joinery (main stair, wall panelling, cabinetwork, window and door joinery) made from local North Queensland timbers; polished timber floors; decorative battening to the fibrous-cement ceilings; leadlighting; tiling; terrazzo work; plaster and stucco work; glazed brick fireplace surround in the dining room/lounge; and signage
- early purpose-built furniture made from local North Queensland timbers (including dining room chairs and club chairs in the foyer).

The hotel is important in exemplifying the commercial work of the prominent Cairns architectural firm of R Hill and AJH Taylor (1927–c. 1940 and 1945–1952), which made a significant contribution to far north Queensland's built environment in the interwar years.
