= Mossman Shire Hall and Douglas Shire Council Chambers =

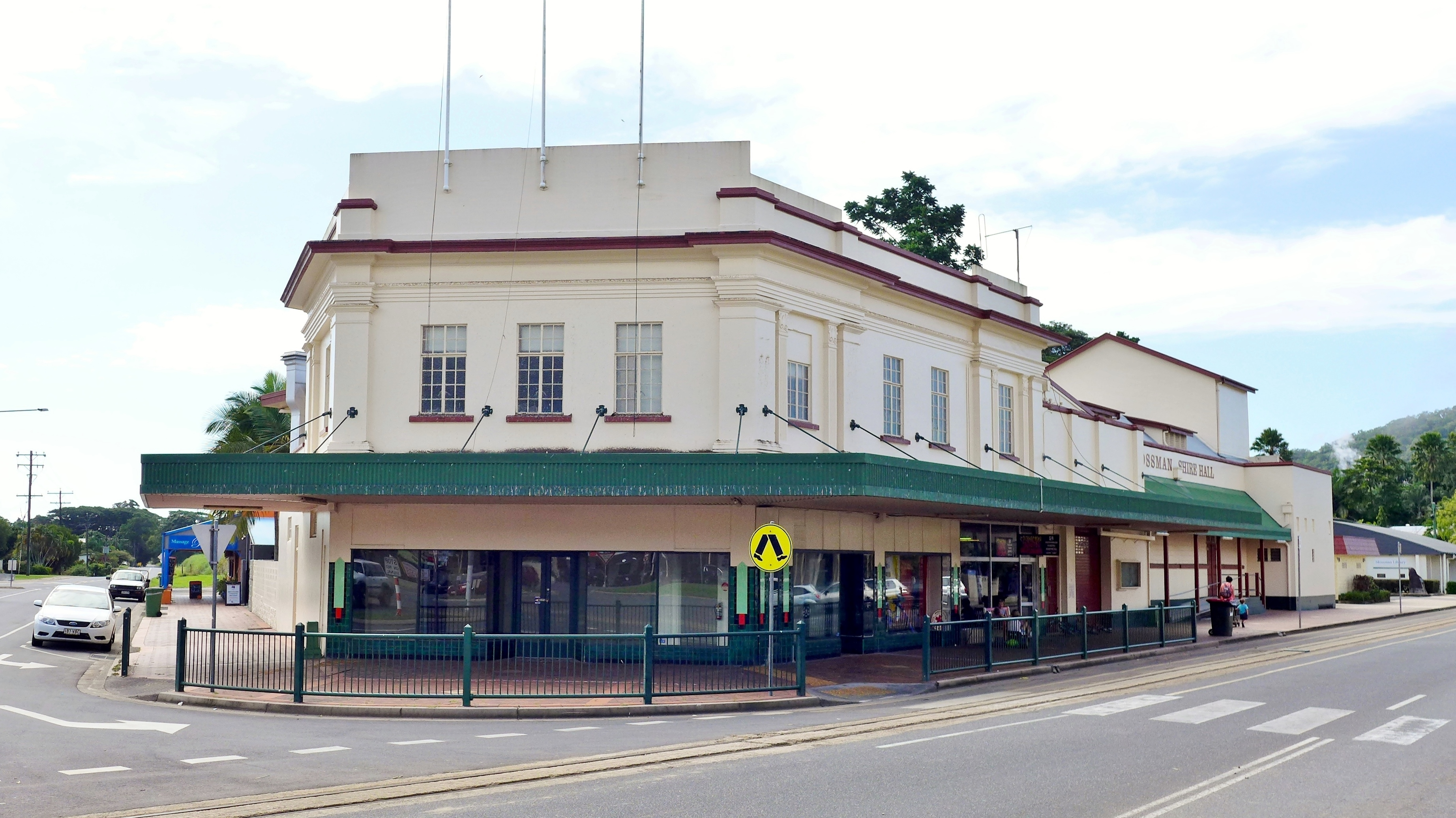
- Mossman Shire Hall, 2015

- Location within Queensland Location within Australia
- 16.4589°S 145.3744°E
- Location: 8–14 Mill Street, Mossman, Shire of Douglas, Queensland, Australia

History
- Design period: 1919–1930s (interwar period)
- Built: 1937

Site notes
- Architect: Hill & Taylor
- Architectural style: Functionalism

Queensland Heritage Register
- Official name: Mossman Shire Hall and Douglas Shire Council Chambers (former)
- Type: state heritage (built)
- Designated: 6 August 2010
- Reference no.: 602758
- Significant period: interwar period
- Significant components: shop/s, hall, office/s, stage/sound shell
- Builders: Tarmey & Euhus

Mossman Shire Hall and Douglas Shire Council Chambers is a heritage-listed former town hall at 8–14 Mill Street, Mossman, Shire of Douglas, Queensland, Australia. It was designed by Hill & Taylor and built in 1937 by Tarmey & Euhus. It was added to the Queensland Heritage Register on 6 August 2010.

== History ==
The former Mossman Shire Hall and Douglas Shire Council Chambers, constructed 1936–1937, is a substantial civic building that reflects the importance of the sugar industry to north Queensland during the interwar period and is associated with the ascendancy of Mossman as a commercial and administrative centre and the decline of Port Douglas as an early regional centre. The hall also demonstrates the pattern of construction of civic buildings for local government purposes during the 1930s using funds from the Queensland Government Unemployment Relief Scheme.

The town of Mossman lies inland from Port Douglas, on the flood-plain of the Mossman River between the Great Dividing Range and the coast, about 70 kilometres (43 mi) north of Cairns. Port Douglas was established in 1877 as an alternative to Cairns as a service port to the Hodgkinson goldfield, which had been proclaimed on 15 June 1876. With the construction of the Cairns–Kuranda railway line in 1882–1891, Port Douglas gradually declined as a town and port. The Mossman district, although initially taken up as homestead selections supplying fodder, maize and tropical fruits to the goldfields, converted to sugar-growing in the 1890s and prospered in the early twentieth century. During these formative years, the region was part of the Douglas Divisional Board (established in 1880) but was replaced by Douglas Shire Council on 30 March 1903 after the Local Authorities Act 1902 abolished divisional boards.

The township of Mossman was created from a private subdivision made following the establishment of the Mossman Central Mill on the Mossman River in 1894–1895 under the Sugar Works Guarantee Act 1893. Sugar production in the Mossman district expanded rapidly from this time. Despite this, in 1910 the township comprised little more than the Exchange Hotel, a store, butcher's shop, hall and timber church, clustered around the sugar mill. These buildings and most of nearby Port Douglas were severely damaged by a cyclone on 16 March 1911. In the aftermath, and with the continued increase of both transient and permanent workers in the sugar industry, businesses at Port Douglas gradually gravitated to Mossman. In the 1920s the Court House and banking facilities moved from Port Douglas to Mossman, and by the end of the decade Mossman was the administrative centre of Douglas Shire.

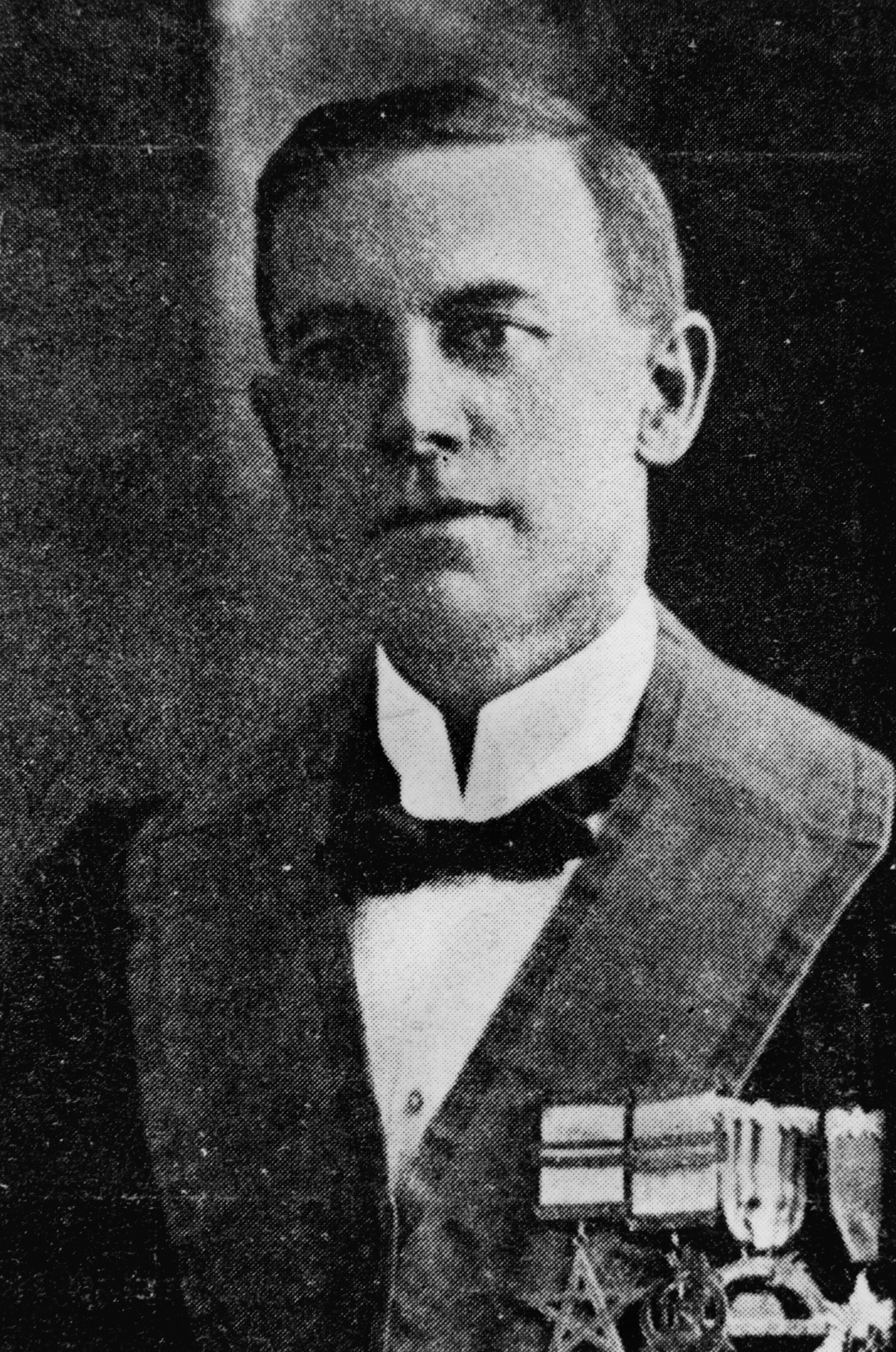
Raymond David Rex, Chairman of Douglas Shire, 1933

Despite the growing population in Mossman, Douglas Shire councillors continued to meet in Port Douglas. In 1932, however, the Queensland Government amended the Local Authorities Act so that governments-in-council could subdivide shires into divisions for election purposes. As a result, the Douglas Shire was divided into five divisions and all but one of the new divisions had one council member. Division three (Mossman River to South Mossman River) had two council members which gave residents of Mossman greater council representation and influence. A new council was elected in 1933 and Raymond David Rex was elected Chairman. Moves to improve town facilities began immediately, with the Mossman Chamber of Commerce requesting that Mossman be declared a municipality so that water services could be upgraded and street lights electrified. While Mossman never became a municipality, it did become the administrative and commercial hub of Douglas Shire, and from 1937, the seat of the Douglas Shire Council.

In August 1934 Rex proposed council borrow £4,250 and use subsidies from the Queensland Government's Unemployment Relief Scheme to build a new shire hall and council offices at Mossman on a 1-acre (0.40 ha) site in the centre of the town, to which council had held the title since 1903. The Unemployment Relief Scheme was part of the Forgan Smith Labour Government's strategy to support employment. Many civic buildings and infrastructure projects were established across Queensland using this scheme, the Intermittent Relief Work Scheme, and projects managed by the Bureau of Industry. Other extant shire halls in Queensland that were constructed during this period include Gladstone Town Hall (1933–1934, now Gladstone Regional Art Gallery and Museum), Gayndah Soldier's Memorial Hall and Council Chambers (1935, now Gayndah Shire Hall), Bowen Shire Council Offices (1935–1937), Johnstone Shire Hall (1935–1938), and Goondiwindi Shire Hall (1937–1938, now the Goondiwindi Civic Centre).

In Mossman, a special meeting was convened to discuss Rex's proposal. His vision to construct a hall, shire offices and commercial shops (to make the venture viable) was supported by other councillors and the proposal went to tender in October 1934. The council was split regarding the choice of design but eventually selected plans by well-known Cairns architects Richard Hill and AJH Taylor. Hill & Taylor, in partnership from 1927 to c. 1940 and then 1945 to 1952, designed a number of prominent north Queensland civic buildings between the first and second world wars, including the Cairns City Council Chambers (1929–1930), Cairns Post Office (1930), Johnstone Shire Hall in Innisfail (1935–1938) and a number of country hospitals, including Mossman District Hospital (c. 1930) and Proserpine Hospital (1939–1940).

However, the process of finalising the design and layout was protracted. Continued deliberations regarding building components, style and plans caused delays and friction within the council, and between council and the architects. The final proposal stipulated that the new shire hall complex would comprise four commercial shops, council offices upstairs, a hall, supper lounge and ample stage accommodation. Costs were not to exceed £8,500. Three additional sets of plans were submitted before they were sent to the Public Works Department for approval. Its report outlined a range of issues that required attention and the architects were asked to amend plans and get their representative in Brisbane to liaise with them. Although tenders for the construction of the hall were called in July 1935 it was not until November 1935 that builders Arthur Zillfleisch and Tom Booth were nominated. Further problems saw the tender to build the hall eventually being awarded to Messrs Tarmey & Euhus, the firm that had submitted the lowest tender price of £9,896/17/6. Despite continued problems during the construction period, the building was finally completed in 1937 and officially opened on 9 June 1937.

The new shire hall had four shops on the lower floor, including a chemist and cafe. The incorporation of retail spaces into public halls, theatres and large civic buildings was popular during the 1920s and 1930s - a means of maximising the income that could be derived from these large and expensive projects. The shire halls and council offices at Goondiwindi, Innisfail and Bowen, for example, all had ground floor, street-accessed retail spaces included as part of the design. If the building contained a public hall or theatre, one of the shops inevitably was occupied by a cafe.

The Mossman Shire Hall, with its drop screen, stage and orchestra pit and dressing rooms, was subsequently used for a range of community events and functions. In 1938, alterations and additions were made by Hill & Taylor. These included: extending the awning to the pavement from the hall, a new area for storing chairs on the northern side of the building, new kitchen facilities in the commercial premises, and renewing flashing and box guttering on the southern side of building. During World War II, the hall was used by troops as a dance hall.

In the 1970s, additions and alterations to the hall included enclosing the louvred wall on Mill Street with concrete block to reduce the noise from the tram line (which passes within two metres of the building) and to block out natural light.

In 1996 Douglas Shire Council moved into new offices in Front Street, Mossman and vacated the offices on the upper level of the 1937 building. In 2008 Douglas Shire, Mulgrave Shire and City of Cairns were amalgamated under the Cairns Regional Council, with one representative from the former Douglas Shire. The former Mossman Shire Hall is still used for a variety of community events, while the commercial premises on the ground floor are occupied as shops or by community project groups. In June 2008 the entire former Douglas Shire was declared an iconic place under the Iconic Queensland Places Act 2008. In the gazetted declaration (No. 52, 20 June 2008) the built environment values listed as being notable and worthy of preservation include those related to Mossman being the administrative centre of the Shire.

== Description ==
The former Mossman Shire Hall and Douglas Shire Council Chambers is a large rendered concrete building located on a level site in the centre of Mossman at the intersection of Mill Street (the main street of the town), Junction Road and the Captain Cook Highway. The building is orientated east–west extending along Mill Street. Its western end comprises two storeys with its principal south-west elevation truncated to face the intersection and giving it prominence as a civic building in the centre of the town. Retail premises (originally four shops) are located on the ground floor with offices (originally the council offices) on the first floor. The hall and its ancillary facilities including supper lounge, stage and fly tower occupy the remainder of the building and are located east of the shops along Mill Street.

The shop fronts are protected by a cantilevered awning which has early pressed metal edge detailing; the westernmost shop has an entrance in the principal (south-west) elevation, and the remaining three shop fronts have entrances off MiIl Street. Three of the four shop fronts retain large metal framed display windows with recessed timber entrance doors and fixed panels (originally glazing) above. Walls surrounding the display windows have a dado of dark green glazed tiling decorated with geometric glazed tile patterns in pale green, red and black. The eastern shop front (to the former cafe) has been replaced with aluminium-framed glazing and entrance door and alternate tiling.

Above the awning, the north-west, south-west and southern elevations to the offices have been articulated with classical detailing including pilasters and entablature. To the north-west and southern elevation the pilasters are paired with smaller pilasters of the Corinthian order. Eight multi-light steel-framed casement pairs with fanlights provide natural light and ventilation to the offices; one on the north-west elevation, three on the south-west elevation and four on the southern elevation. The gabled roof over the offices is concealed behind a parapet which steps up along the south-west elevation and to which three flagpoles are fixed.

The cantilevered awning extends east over the entrance to the first floor offices, the entrance to the hall and the ticket office. A pair of three panelled timber doors provides access to the first floor offices and a roller door has replaced earlier entrance doors to the hall. The parapet above this section of the building is articulated with pilasters and a simple cornice and conceals a skillion roof to offices that are a later addition between the former council offices and hall.

East of the hall foyer the building line steps back from the street alignment. The hall floor is approximately 600 millimetres (24 in) higher than street level and has two pairs of doors reached by pairs of stairs. The doors are set within concrete block walls which have replaced lower level banks of louvres that extended to the ceiling of the hall. This southern facade of the hall has a skillion-roofed verandah which is a later addition. The gabled roof to the hall is partially concealed behind a parapet along the southern elevation and has two clerestory lights along both sides.

The walls to fly tower and southern dressing room are featureless apart from four small high level multi-light casements to the dressing room and a single window to the rear of the stage. The fly tower has a gabled roof, while the rear of the stage, a skillion roof. A parapet conceals a skillion roof over the dressing room.

The eastern elevation of the building is largely featureless with three high level multi-light casements, a fourth casement at the back of the fly tower and a window to the rear of the dressing room. Three openings on the eastern elevation give access to the basement below the stage. The opening at the southern end has a pair of ledged doors, while the other two openings have been altered with infill panels and later doors.

Adjacent to the north-east corner of the building is a small toilet block which is a later addition and partially conceals the early rear wall of the dressing room. The northern elevation of the supper lounge is clad in patterned board sheeting which appears to be a later addition. The kitchen adjacent to the supper lounge is clad in timber weatherboards. The northern elevation of the office and shop components has been substantially altered with concrete block additions.

=== Commercial premises ===
Interior partitions between the shops are of rendered concrete and the partition between the shops at the western end of the building has been removed, to form one larger retail space. Despite this change, the four former shop volumes are apparent and each retains early decorative cornices and ceiling roses. The third shop from the west was a former chemist and retains early timber cupboards and shelving. Alterations and additions have been made at the rear of the shops.

=== First floor Chambers (former council offices) ===
The stair hall leading to the first floor offices from Mill Street consists of 25 treads in a single flight with timber handrails fixed to the walls. The early office layout has been altered with additional partitions added and openings made in early walls. Some v-jointed tongue and groove partitions and early ceilings and geometric patterned cornices remain under later wall linings and above suspended ceilings. The timber cabinets at the enquiry counter appear to be early.

=== The Hall ===
The overall fabric of the hall is intact, although a few alterations have been made. The ceilings retain features such as decorative ceiling roses and cornices with geometric designs. The proscenium arch has elaborate mouldings with abstract geometric designs. Pairs of eight-light French doors opening to the north into the supper lounge are intact (although a few lights have been replaced), as is the timber floor. The walls at the rear of the hall are clad in later perforated acoustic corrugated steel sheets. The southern side of the hall has concrete block infill between structural concrete pillars with banks of louvres above the walls. Female toilets at the rear of the hall are an addition. The supper lounge and kitchen area retains its original form but appears to have no original features.

=== Stage area ===
The timber stage is approximately one metre above the hall floor. It has a raked floor and has been extended and possibly covers a former orchestra pit. The dressing rooms at either side of the stage have concrete walls, remain largely intact and follow the original plan. Steps lead down from this level to toilets which also can be accessed from the hall. One bathroom has been refitted. Underneath the stage are storage rooms accessed from outside.

== Heritage listing ==
The former Mossman Shire Hall and Douglas Shire Council Chambers was listed on the Queensland Heritage Register on 6 August 2010 having satisfied the following criteria.

The place is important in demonstrating the evolution or pattern of Queensland's history.

The Mossman Shire Hall and Douglas Shire Council Chambers are important in demonstrating the pattern of Queensland's history, in particular the construction of civic buildings during the 1930s assisted by funding from relief and job-creation schemes. Civic projects - including shire and town halls, offices and chambers; community swimming pools; roads; bridges; and street and park beautification schemes - were undertaken throughout Queensland at this period as a result of these schemes, and as a group these places are important in articulating a particular historical period, the impact of State government initiatives to combat the economic depression, and design concepts popular at the time.

The Mossman Shire Hall and Douglas Shire Council Chambers is a substantial building for a small administrative centre, and in this it is important in illustrating the era of prosperity accompanying the expansion of the north Queensland sugar industry during the 1920s and 1930s, and the shift during these years of the administrative heart of Douglas Shire from Port Douglas to Mossman in the State's northernmost sugar-growing district.

The place is important in demonstrating the principal characteristics of a particular class of cultural places.

The Mossman Shire Hall and Douglas Shire Council Chambers building is a good representative example of a regional civic complex. It remains substantially intact and is important in illustrating the principal characteristics of a 1930s civic building located in the centre of town on the corner of Mossman's principal streets, combining council offices and meeting rooms, retail spaces, and a large public hall with entry foyer, stage, fly-tower and dressing rooms. Early features include: steel-framed, multi-paned casement windows to the former offices; a cantilevered street awning with decorative metal edging; shop fronts with decorative ceramic tiles; timber cabinetry in the former chemist's shop; decorative plaster work to the ceilings of the former council offices; clerestory lights/ventilation panels in the roof of the hall; and timber floors throughout.

The Mossman Shire Hall and Douglas Shire Council Chambers is significant as a building designed by the architectural partnership of Hill and Taylor, prominent local architects in north Queensland during the interwar period, and contributes to our understanding of their portfolio of work across this part of the state.
