= Mossman District Hospital =

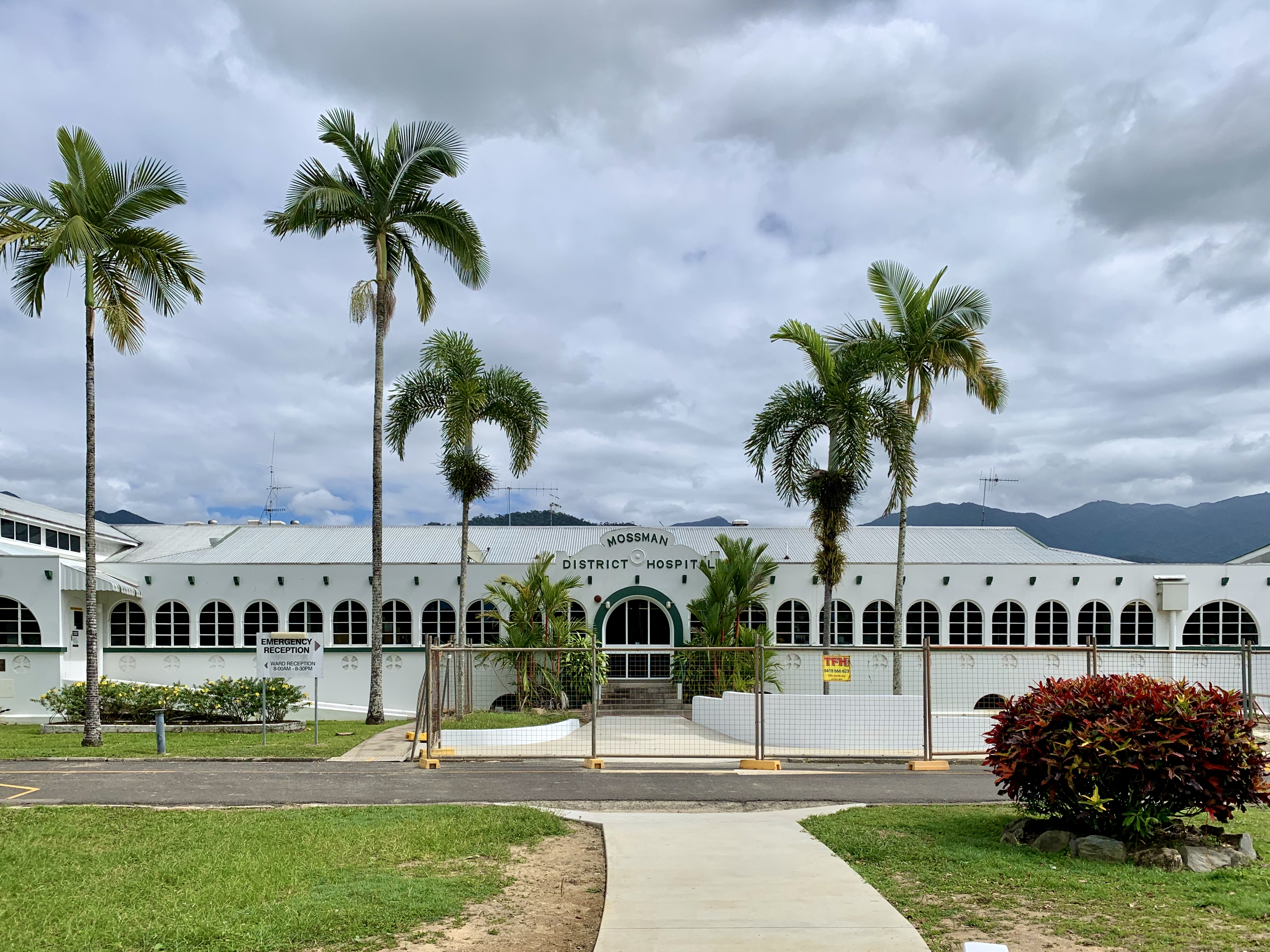
- Mossman District Hospital, 2020

- Location within Queensland Location within Australia
- 16.4643°S 145.3684°E
- Location: Johnston Road, Mossman, Shire of Douglas, Queensland, Australia

History
- Design period: 1919–1930s (interwar period)
- Built: circa 1930; 96 years ago

Site notes
- Architect: Hill & Taylor
- Architectural style: Spanish Mission

Queensland Heritage Register
- Official name: Mossman District Hospital
- Type: state heritage (landscape, built)
- Designated: 12 June 2009
- Reference no.: 602713
- Significant period: 1920s–1940s
- Significant components: gate – entrance, garden/grounds, theatre – operating, residential accommodation – nurses' quarters, residential accommodation – doctor's house/quarters, ward – block, residential accommodation – staff quarters
- Builders: J J Riley

Mossman District Hospital is a heritage-listed public hospital at Johnston Road, Mossman, Shire of Douglas, Queensland, Australia. It was designed by Hill & Taylor and built c. 1930 by J J Riley. It was added to the Queensland Heritage Register on 12 June 2009.

== History ==
Mossman District Hospital was built c. 1930 by contractor JJ Riley for the Port Douglas Hospitals Board, and was opened on 23 August 1930 by James Kenny, the Member of the Queensland Legislative Assembly for Cook. It was constructed to plans prepared c. 1925 by the Department of Public Works for a standard pavilion-type timber and galvanised iron hospital, and amended c. 1928 by Cairns architects Hill and Taylor to incorporate evocative Spanish Mission style concrete facades.

Mossman lies inland from Port Douglas, on the flood-plain of the Mossman River between the Great Dividing Range and the coast, about 70 kilometres (43 mi) north of Cairns. Port Douglas was established in 1877 as an alternative to Cairns as a service port to the Hodgkinson goldfield that had been proclaimed on 15 June 1876, but with the construction of the Cairns–Kuranda railway line 1882–1891, Port Douglas gradually declined as a town and port. The Mossman district, although initially taken up as homestead selections supplying fodder, maize and tropical fruits to the goldfields, converted to sugar-growing in the 1890s and prospered in the early twentieth century.

The township of Mossman was created from a private subdivision made following the establishment of the Mossman Central Mill on the Mossman River in 1894–1895. By 1910 the township comprised little more than the Exchange Hotel, a store, butcher's shop, hall and timber church, clustered around the sugar mill. These buildings and most of nearby Port Douglas were severely damaged by a cyclone on 16 March 1911. In the aftermath, businesses at Port Douglas gradually gravitated to Mossman and by 1920 the district's major services – including the Douglas Shire Council offices – were located in Mossman. In the 1920s the Court House and banking facilities moved from Port Douglas to Mossman, which by the end of the decade was the administrative centre of the shire. The town was given an additional boost with the completion of the Captain Cook Highway between Cairns and Mossman in 1933.

Prior to 1930 the district hospital was located at Port Douglas. Constructed c. 1878, it was administered by a volunteer Hospital Committee and funded through local subscriptions, fund-raising and donations. Public hospitals were not yet a responsibility of the Queensland Government, and although government assistance was given with the design of hospitals and payment of a resident medical officer's salary, funds to construct and conduct the hospital were raised locally. Public hospitals at this period were regarded as charitable institutions, and patients were means-tested.

The Hospitals Act 1923 gave the Queensland Government greater administrative responsibility for health care and the ability to fund the construction of hospitals. Funds from the Golden Casket lottery scheme established in 1920 were available, but used predominantly for the construction of maternity wards and baby clinics.

The Hospitals Act also introduced the concept of district hospitals. Existing local hospital committees could particulate in the new system, evolving into local hospital boards that included local and Queensland government representatives.

From 1913 the Douglas Hospital Committee held meetings month about at Port Douglas and Mossman, reflecting the expansion of the hinterland community. From January 1923 the community was advocating construction of a hospital in Mossman, especially a maternity hospital.

In late 1924 the Douglas Hospital Committee made the decision that they would maintain the hospital at Port Douglas, but not extend or develop it any further, in anticipation of a new hospital being constructed at Mossman. By late January 1925 the Department of Public Works had prepared plans for a proposed Mossman hospital, to comprise a main block, maternity ward and nurses' quarters. These were single-storeyed timber buildings, high-set on timber stumps, with wide surrounding verandahs, and connected via covered ways. The plan was of the pavilion-ward type, reflecting contemporary thinking on hospital design. From the 1860s to the 1930s almost all hospitals erected in Queensland were pavilion plan – developed in Europe and England in the 1850s – based on the principles of providing good ventilation, light and sanitation, and on selecting a generous area of land, preferably elevated and on the outskirts of a town, to achieve this.

In the early twentieth century Queensland developed a variant of the pavilion plan hospital, the principal characteristics being: high-set timber construction; medium-to high-pitched roofs clad in corrugated iron, wide surrounding timber verandahs; ceiling vents and roof ventilators to assist air flow; the combination of male and female wards within a single pavilion, separated by smaller rooms such as matron's room, doctor's room, nurses' room and single bed private wards; and bathrooms, toilets and kitchens contained in semi-detached blocks off the main pavilions. In hospitals constructed after 1925, the provision of an operating theatre and an x-ray room became standard. Between 1901 and 1938, 78 pavilion plan hospitals/wards were erected in Queensland; by 1996 only 23 (just under 30 per cent) were extant and substantially intact; of the others, one had been removed from the site and the remainder had been demolished.

By January 1926 a large, level site off Johnston Road, about 0.5 miles (0.80 km) south-west of the centre of Mossman, had been acquired for the new hospital. A plan of the proposed hospital layout for the site was prepared by Public Works in April 1926, positioning the main building close to the centre of the site, facing east, and accessed from Hospital Street. To the north of the main building, connected via a covered way, were the nurses' quarters, and to south, also connected via a covered way, the maternity ward. At the western side of the site, and not physically connected to the main building, were a number of ancillary buildings, structures and facilities: a doctor's residence (with private driveway off Johnston Road), tennis court, wardsman's quarters, water supply pump house, drying green, laundry and powerhouse, incinerator, and morgue. The buildings were spaced well apart, to allow for future expansion on the site.

In April 1926 the Douglas Hospital Committee (established under the Voluntary Hospitals system) was replaced by the Port Douglas Hospitals Board (formed under the 1923 Act). Through 1926 debate between the Board and the Queensland government centred on whether the Port Douglas hospital buildings would be re-located to Mossman, or new construction approved. The Department of Public Works estimated a cost of £20,868 to erect an entirely new hospital and £18,016 if the nurses' quarters and doctor's residence were re-located from Port Douglas. Local estimates were called, which proved lower than Works had anticipated, and in October 1928 the Board accepted from the government a loan of $14,000 for construction of entirely new hospital buildings.

However, the Board also referred the Works Department design to Cairns architects Hill and Taylor, to prepare an alternative scheme in concrete based on the original plans. Richard Hill and Arthur John Henry Taylor were in partnership in Cairns from 1927 to c. 1940, with a branch office in Townsville 1933–1939. The partnership was resumed in 1945 but was dissolved in 1952. During the interwar years Hill and Taylor developed an extensive practice in northern Queensland. Their work included the Cairns City Council Chambers (1929–1930, Cairns City Council Chambers); the Johnstone Shire Hall at Innisfail (1935–1938, Johnstone Shire Hall); the Barron Valley Hotel (1940) at Atherton, and buildings at several district hospitals besides Mossman, including Boulia (emergency operating theatre, 1936), Cairns (nurses' quarters, 1937), Mareeba (new hospital building, 1937), and Proserpine (new hospital building 1939–1940, Proserpine Hospital).

For the Mossman Hospital, Hill and Taylor proposed replacing the planned timber balustrades to the verandahs with decorative, arcaded concrete verandah facades in the Spanish Mission style popular at the time. They argued that the concrete exterior would be less expensive to maintain, would save on fire insurance costs, and would better withstand cyclonic weather. The Department of Public Works approved the amended design and in mid-1929 extended the loan to £16,000.

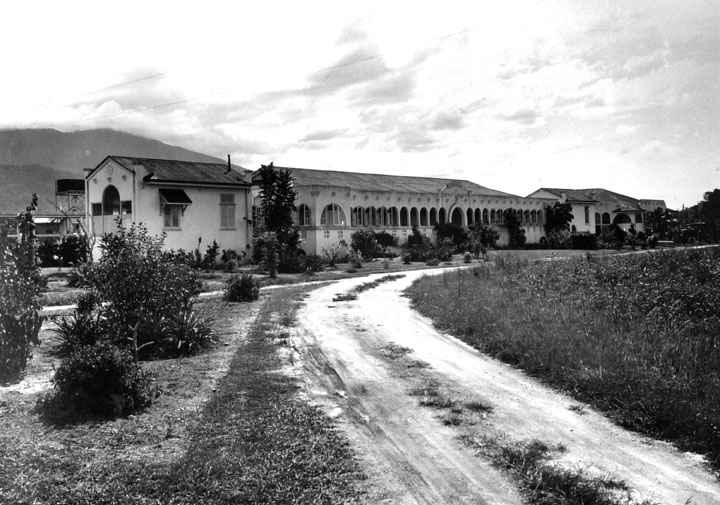
Mossman Hospital in the Spanish Mission style, 1935

Spanish Mission style architecture was popularised in Australia from the late 1920s. The emphasis on wide colonnaded or arcaded verandahs and white stuccoed exterior walls set against lush gardens (as popularised in the Californian version of the style), translated well to Australia's warm climate, particularly in Queensland. In utilising this idiom for the Mossman Hospital, Hill and Taylor created the illusion that the buildings were of a more substantial construction than was the reality – being principally timber-framed, clad and lined structures – and the white-walled buildings in the garden setting against a mountain backdrop proved to be extremely picturesque. It is the only Queensland public hospital constructed with a Spanish Mission exterior.

Decorative embellishments were kept to a minimum (to reduce costs and lessen maintenance) and included: curved concrete arches to the verandahs; moulded Maltese crosses in the front balustrades; a curved parapet defining the central entrance, with the raised lettering 'Mossman District hospital'; and concrete arches defining the entrances off Hospital Street and Johnston Road.

When opened in 1930, the hospital comprised: a main building with male and female wards, operating room, dispensary wing, outpatients wing, and kitchen wing; maternity ward; nurses' quarters; and medical superintendent's residence. The hospital was soon operating at capacity, a reflection of the growth of the Mossman district during the 1930s, and extensions were necessary within a few years. About 1936 new nurses' quarters were erected just inside the entrance to the site off Hospital Street, north of the drive, and at this time the 1930 nursers' quarters were converted into a female ward. A new operating theatre was constructed c. 1940 (Hill and Taylor called the tenders for this late in 1939). By 1946 the former nurses' quarters at Port Douglas (a detached timber building) had been moved onto the site and located just inside the main entrance gate, to serve as the Board Room and Secretary's Office for the Port Douglas Hospitals Board. Also by this date, an isolation block had been constructed at the north-west corner of the site, connected via a covered way to the female ward (1930 nurses' quarters). New staff quarters were erected c. 1949 on the western side of the site, north of the doctor's residence. In 1965 the outpatients wing/former dispensary at the northern end of the main building was demolished and replaced by a new building that provided accommodation for administration, outpatients and a dental clinic.

Major renovations and additions to the main building were made in 1992, when a large extension was constructed to the rear of and between the main building and the maternity ward, so that the formerly detached maternity ward was made part of the main block.

In 2016 the hospital remains a working facility of Queensland Health and provides 24 beds for acute inpatients unit and 8 beds for residential aged care.

== Description ==
The Mossman Hospital is a complex of lowset buildings set on a level site on the western outskirts of Mossman. Cane fields and the Main Coast Range form a backdrop to the buildings which are set amongst spacious grounds of tended lawns and tropical gardens. A sweeping driveway, framed at access points by concrete formed gateways, approaches the main wing which is dominated by an extensive concrete facade with arched openings in the Spanish Mission style.

The core of the complex consists of a series of 1930s and 1940s buildings of timber-framed construction with exterior walls formed in reinforced concrete together and newer buildings infilling spaces that previously separated the earlier pavilions. Early buildings include the Main Wing (c. 1930), the Maternity Wing (c. 1930) and the former Female Ward (built c. 1930 as nurses' quarters and now the Community Health Building) which face the east; former Nurses' Quarters (1936, now the Dialysis Building) to the north-east; an Operating Theatre (c. 1940) and Kitchen block (c. 1930) behind the Main Wing; and a Doctor's Residence (c. 1930) set apart to the south. Staff quarters (c. 1949) are located to the west of the main building.

A large, t-shaped building, constructed in 1991, now links the Main Wing and Maternity Wing together and another building, constructed in 1965, links the Main Wing to the former Female Ward. Both the 1965 and the 1991 buildings sit forward of the c. 1930 buildings. An early covered walkway (c. 1936) links the former Female Ward to the former Nurses' Quarters.

=== Main Wing c. 1930 ===
The Main Wing is a long, narrow, symmetrical building of timber-framed construction with external parapet walls formed in reinforced concrete. It has a large hipped roof clad in corrugated metal sheeting with gablets at each end. The concrete walls are finished with a smooth render painted white and are punctuated with a series of arched windows to an enclosed verandah space. These frame a larger arched central entranceway. The building is raised off the ground and supported on concrete stumps. The external concrete walls extend down to the ground and are finished with a concrete plinth running around the base of building. A suspended concrete-formed ramp runs across the front of the building leading to a secondary entrance at the southern end. The arched entranceway is trimmed in red/ochre-coloured paint and is accessed via concrete formed splayed steps. The words "MOSSMAN DISTRICT HOSPITAL" is lettered above the opening. Box gutters run behind the length of the parapet wall and large painted metal rain heads are located at the southern and northern ends. Decorative features include brackets located between the windows and the top of the parapet wall, a circular Maltese cross motif pressed into the walls below each of the windows, and scalloped edging and a circular motif above the entranceway.

The southern elevation has similar details to the front including concrete-formed parapet walls, arched steel-framed windows, decorative brackets and the Maltese cross detail.

The Main Wing consists of a central bank of offices, meeting and consultation rooms with long corridors formed by enclosed verandahs running along the length of the eastern and western sides. The enclosed verandahs have early fabric visible including v-jointed boards and belt-rails to internal walls and ceilings, and pairs of panelled timber French-light doors with glazed fanlights above. The inside face of the external walls are finished with smooth cement render similar to the outside and the Maltese cross motif is also visible. On the eastern verandah early floorboards that have been painted are visible. On the western verandah the floor has been lined with a recent resilient floor finish. Generally, most internal walls within the office and consultation areas appear to be early and formed from v-jointed boards though many have been lined up to two metres from the floor with resilient finishes. Ceilings are early v-jointed boards. Door and window hardware and light fittings appear to be recent. Some glazing to the French-light doors has been painted.

=== Maternity Wing c. 1930 ===
The Maternity Wing is a smaller building to the south and is connected to the Main Wing via the 1991 extension. Like the Main Wing its principal elevation is to the east and it is of a timber-framed construction with external parapet walls formed in reinforced concrete and finished in a smooth cement render. It is asymmetrical in layout with a projecting gable to the east hidden behind a parapet wall with a scalloped profile. The remainder of the roof is hipped and clad in corrugated metal sheeting with a gablet to the northern end. An L-shaped verandah, with pairs of arched openings and timber slat balustrades capped with a bread-loaf profile handrail, runs the length of the building and runs around to the north where it adjoins the 1991 extension. It is accessed via concrete formed steps. The building is raised off the ground and supported on concrete stumps. Like the Main Wing, the external concrete walls extend down to the ground finishing at a concrete plinth. It has large arched openings to provide ventilation to the sub-floor area. The Maternity Wing has similar detailing and decorative features to the Main Wing including decorative brackets between the arched openings and the top of the parapet wall, scalloped edging and a circular motif above the projecting gable.

The northern elevation has similar details to the front elevation including concrete-formed parapet walls, arched verandah openings, timber slat balustrades and decorative brackets. A recent timber deck joins the Maternity Wing in this area to the 1991 extension.

The Maternity Wing consists of a maternity ward surrounded by verandahs on three sides (east, north and west) with a small projection to the west. It appears to have been re-roofed when the 1991 extension took place. The internal fabric appears to be original though some internal doors have been replaced. The verandah to the west has been enclosed to form a corridor that links the Maternity Wing to the 1991 extension.

Both the unenclosed and enclosed verandahs have early fabric visible including v-jointed boards and belt-rails to walls and ceilings and pairs of panelled timber French-light doors with glazed fanlights above. Floors to the enclosed verandah to the west have been covered with a resilient floor finish. The rear wall appears to have been altered during the 1991 extension.

Generally, most internal walls within the ward appear to be early though some have been lined up to 2 metres (6 ft 7 in) from the floor with resilient finishes. Door and window hardware and light fittings appear to be recent.

A small room (use unknown) has been built post-1991 to the south of the maternity wing and has similar detailing to the older areas.

=== Former Nurses' Quarters c. 1930 (Community Health Building) ===
This building is located to the north of the Main Wing. An additional wing was added in 1991 to the rear (west).

Like the Main Wing and Maternity Wing its principal elevation is to the east and it is of timber-framed construction with external parapet walls formed in reinforced concrete and finished with a smooth cement render. The main elevation is symmetrical in layout with central concrete-formed steps leading to a verandah which extends the length of the frontage. The front parapet wall is punctured by three large arched openings with pairs of narrow arched bays in between. Timber slat balustrades capped with bread-loaf profile handrails are located either side of the central opening. A timber slatted gate is located at the stop of the steps. The building has a hipped roof and is clad in corrugated metal sheeting. The front corners of the roof extend beyond the wall line and wrap around the front parapet wall. Gutters to the eaves are recent and have a square-profile.

Like the other c.1930 buildings it is raised off the ground and supported on concrete stumps. Its external concrete walls extend down to the ground finishing at a concrete plinth with large arched openings to provide ventilation to the sub-floor area. It has similar detailing and decorative features to the other buildings including decorative brackets, scalloped top edges to the parapet wall and a circular motif above the entrance.

The northern elevation has similar details to the front elevation including concrete-formed parapet walls, arched openings and decorative brackets. Recent aluminium windows have been inserted into the arched openings along this elevation. The southern elevation opens into a courtyard space created by the adjacent c. 1965 building. It is edged by an open verandah with arched openings and timber slat balustrades.

The building consists of offices surrounded on all four sides by verandahs. The verandahs to the east and south remain open while the verandah to the north has been enclosed to form offices. The verandah to the west has been enclosed to form a corridor between the former Female Ward and the 1991 extension. All of the verandah spaces have intact early fabric including v-jointed boards and belt-rails to walls and ceilings, floorboards and pairs of panelled timber French-light doors with glazed fanlights above.

Generally, most internal walls within the office spaces appear to be early though some have been lined up to two metres from the floor with resilient finishes. Door and window hardware and light fittings appear to be recent.

=== Medical Superintendent's Residence c. 1930 ===
The Doctor's Residence is located to the south-west of the Main Wing and is set amongst tropical foliage beyond the bitumen drive. Like the other c. 1930 buildings it is a timber-framed building with external walls formed in reinforced concrete but is of a more domestic scale. It is raised off the ground and supported on concrete stumps. The external walls extend down to the ground finishing at a concrete plinth with large arched openings providing ventilation to the sub- floor area. It has simpler detailing and decorative features than the other buildings.

Its principal elevation is to the south where a parapet wall, finished with a smooth cement render, conceals a hipped roof which is clad in corrugated metal sheeting. The parapet wall wraps around each corner to the east and west. The main elevation is symmetrical in layout with a central concrete-formed set of steps leading to a verandah that extends the length of the frontage. Three arched openings are located on each side of the steps. Diamond-shaped infills are located below handrail height. A recent aluminium gate is located at the top of the steps and other openings have been screened with aluminium framed flyscreens.

On the northern elevation the hipped roof extends beyond the wall to an ogee profile metal eaves gutter. The roof shades a secondary entrance which leads via concrete formed steps onto a small porch. Details are similar to the main elevation with arched openings and diamond-shaped infills repeated. A c. 1950s bathroom building has been constructed immediately in front of the remainder of the elevation. It is a simple, timber-framed structure clad in profiled fibre-cement sheeting and supported on concrete stumps.

On the eastern elevation a second set of concrete-formed steps leads via an arched doorway to the southern verandah. Octagonal and arched- shaped openings are located on either side of the doorway all of which have been enclosed with screens. One arched opening has been enclosed with a timber window. A circular motif is located above the doorway where some curved detailing appears to have been removed.

The western elevation has similar details with concrete parapet walls arched openings with diamond-shaped infills to the verandah. Metal window awnings have been added above the window openings.

Though access to the interior of the residence was limited, much of the interior fabric and layout remains intact including v-jointed boards and belt-rails to walls and ceilings. Early floorboards are visible from the sub-floor area.

=== Kitchen block c. 1930 (remodelled c. 1949) ===
The Kitchen block is small building located behind the Main Wing. It has a gabled roof clad in corrugated metal sheeting and external walls of rendered reinforced concrete. Openings appear to be early and are both arched and rectangular with decorative metal window hoods located on the south elevation. A decorative circular motif is located in the gable to the south. A decorative metal-formed eaves bracket supports the roof in the south-west corner.

Internally ceilings are lined with v-jointed boards but walls appear to have been re-lined when refurbishments have taken place. Some internal walls appear to have been removed.

=== Former Nurses' Quarters c. 1936 (Dialysis Building) ===
The former Nurses' Quarters is a separate pavilion building linked to the former Female Ward via a timber framed covered walkway. It is sited to the north-east and is T-shaped in plan. It has been refurbished and painted recently.

This building is of a similar construction to the other c. 1930 buildings with timber-framing to internal walls, roofs and floors and external parapet walls formed in reinforced concrete finished with a smooth cement render. Its principal elevation faces the south and is symmetrical in layout with two sets of concrete formed steps accessing the front verandah which runs the length of the building. Each set of steps has walls of reinforced concrete with an oversized scroll detail. The building has a hipped roof concealed behind the parapet walls with gablets at each end and is clad in corrugated metal sheeting. The verandah roof is supported on square reinforced concrete posts and has balustrades also formed in reinforced concrete. At the eastern end, part of the verandah has been enclosed with aluminium windows with a recent metal awning above while at the western end two openings are screened with timber lattice panels.

The building is raised off the ground and supported on concrete stumps. Again, the external concrete walls extend down to the ground finishing at a concrete plinth. Large arched openings provide ventilation to the sub-floor area. It has similar detailing and decorative features to the other c. 1930 buildings including decorative brackets between the verandah openings and the top of the parapet wall and scalloped edging features above the openings. Circular moulding formed from concrete emphasises the entrance points. Openings on the verandah have been altered where it appears early door openings have been enclosed with aluminium windows and sheeted to floor level. Painted floorboards are exposed but it is unclear if these are recent.

The eastern and western elevations have similar details to the front elevation. Parapet walls with decorative brackets extend half-way along the length of the building. Verandah openings have been enclosed with aluminium windows which are covered with a metal awning. For the remainder of these elevations the hipped roof and recent metal square- profile eaves gutters are exposed. On the northern (rear) elevation exterior walls end at the soffit line where the hipped roof extends to the eaves gutter. Openings on this elevation appear to have been altered and recent steps and ramps added. A recent projection has been built in the north-west corner of the verandah.

The building was originally laid out as nurses' living quarters with verandahs on all four sides. This layout generally remains but the internal dividing walls have been removed to form a central open-plan space and some verandahs have been enclosed to form office spaces and corridors. Much of the early fabric remains in these areas including v-jointed boards and belt-rails to walls and ceilings, timber panelled French light doors with glazed fanlights above. Some internal openings have been sheeted over with recent v-jointed sheeting. Those internal walls remaining have been lined to two metres high with a resilient finish along with all internal floors. Early floor boards are visible from the sub-floor area. Door and window hardware and light fittings appear to be recent.

A courtyard space is located behind the building to the south surrounded in part by a low reinforced concrete wall.

=== Walkway c. 1936 (connecting former Nurses' Quarters and former Female Ward) ===
The walkway links the former Nurses' Quarters and the former Female Ward and is a timber-framed structure with half-height walls and a curved roof. It is supported on concrete stumps and the sub-floor area is enclosed with timber lattice panels. Timber posts support the roof framing which is unlined. Large eaves overhangs are formed with timber eaves brackets which may have been added later. The roof is clad with corrugated metal sheeting. The timber framing to the external walls is sheeted with fibre-cement sheeting and capped with a bread-loaf profile handrail. Early hardwood floorboards are exposed.

=== Operating Theatre c. 1940 ===
The operating theatre is a small building located between the former Female Ward and the Main Wing. It is accessed via a covered walkway. It has a hipped roof clad in corrugated metal sheeting and external walls of rendered reinforced concrete.

The main operating room retains original rendered and painted walls with floors and walls lined up to approximately one metre with tan-coloured terrazzo which also appears to be early. Some openings into this room also appear to be original; others have been altered. Ancillary rooms off the main theatre room have been re-lined.

=== Staff Quarters c. 1949 ===
This building is located to the west of the 1991 extension. It is of similar construction to the c. 1930s buildings but has simpler detailing and little decoration. It has a hipped roof clad in corrugated metal sheeting and external walls of rendered reinforced concrete which extend to ground level. Rectangular ventilation slots mark the sub- floor area. Eaves gutters are recent and square in profile. External windows are aluminium framed glass louvres with recent security grilles fixed to the exterior to the western and eastern elevations with some sliding windows on the western and northern elevations. The entrance area is located on the western elevation and is accessed by a concrete-formed ramp. The entrance door has sidelights of timber lattice. Some early fixed timber louvres are located on the eastern elevation.

The building consists of offices and staff quarters and many internal walls appear to be in their original positions. Ceilings of fibre cement sheeting throughout the building appear to be early. Much of the original fabric to the eastern enclosed verandah remains including fibre-cement sheeted walls and ceilings and hardwood floorboards.

=== Setting and grounds ===
The Mossman Hospital buildings are surrounded by expansive lawns and spacious grounds. The long east-facing main facade overlooks a large tended lawn scattered with established trees and is set apart by a u-shaped bitumen drive. Two vehicle and pedestrian access points are marked by reinforced concrete gateways finished in a smooth cement render. These consist of a large central arch adorned with decorative brackets and a Maltese cross motif is set over the drive with two smaller arches on either side for pedestrian entry. The perimeter of the complex is enclosed with a recent aluminium tubular fence with a tubular steel fence at the rear, which is not considered to be of cultural heritage significance. Pathways through the complex are generally concrete. Garden beds with colourful foliage plantings are located throughout the complex and mark entrance points to the buildings. These are generally defined with concrete edging.

Unobstructed views to the canefields and Main Coast Range to the west are a feature of the site and form a backdrop to the hospital buildings. These buildings and their spacious setting are clearly visible from the complex's entry points.

=== Non-significant elements ===
Various buildings have been added to the site over time and are not considered to be of cultural heritage significance. These include the c. 1991–1992 T-shaped building located between the Maternity Wing and the Main Wing; the c. 1965 building located between the former Female Ward and the Main Wing; the Services Building to the rear of the site; the X-Ray building located between the Kitchen block and the Operating Theatre; and the new Morgue.

== Heritage listing ==
Mossman District Hospital was listed on the Queensland Heritage Register on 12 June 2009 having satisfied the following criteria.

The place is important in demonstrating the evolution or pattern of Queensland's history.

The construction of the Mossman District Hospital (c. 1930 with 1930s and 1940s additions) is important in demonstrating the evolution of Queensland's history, being surviving evidence of the impact of the Hospitals Act 1923 in expanding the provision of hospital facilities in rural Queensland.

The place is important also in demonstrating the consolidation of Mossman as the administrative and service centre of Douglas Shire, at the expense of Port Douglas. This in turn reflected the importance of sugar cropping and milling in the district during the first half of the twentieth century, generating the income and population to support a district hospital in Mossman during the interwar period.

The Mossman District Hospital remains important evidence of a pavilion plan hospital of the early twentieth century. Of the 78 pavilion plan hospitals and wards erected in Queensland between 1901 and 1938, only 23 (just under 30 per cent) were extant and substantially intact by 1996. At the Mossman District Hospital, the original layout of separate but walkway-connected single-storeyed pavilions remains evident, despite later infill additions, illustrating a particular philosophy of hospital design popular in Queensland during the first four decades of the twentieth century. The principal c. 1930 pavilions - main wing and kitchen block, maternity ward, original nurses' quarters, and doctor's residence - remain in situ, as do the 1936 nurses' quarters, c. 1940 operating theatre and c. 1949 staff quarters, and retain their early form and much original fabric. The use of deep surrounding verandahs is important in illustrating the adaptation of pavilion ward design to a sub-tropical climate.

The place is important because of its aesthetic significance.

Retaining much of its original exterior detailing in the Spanish Mission style, and set in landscaped gardens against a mountain backdrop with early decorative concrete arches at the street entrances, the Mossman Hospital and grounds are significant for their strong aesthetic appeal, which has been a valued characteristic of the place since 1930. It is the only Queensland public hospital designed with Spanish Mission style exteriors. The incorporation of similar stylistic elements into later additions to the hospital reflects the significance of the early aesthetic values of the place.
