= Proserpine Hospital =

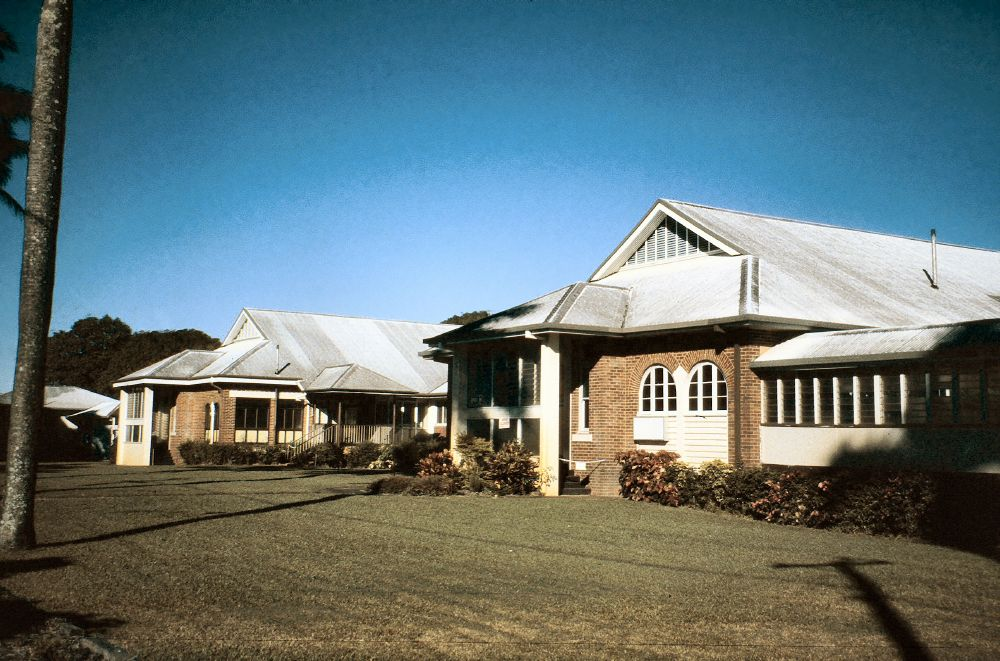
- Proserpine Hospital, 2005

- Location within Queensland Location within Australia
- 20.4004°S 148.5848°E
- Location: Herbert Street, Proserpine, Whitsunday Region, Queensland, Australia

History
- Design period: 1919–1930s (interwar period)
- Built: 1939–1940

Site notes
- Architect: Hill & Taylor

Queensland Heritage Register
- Official name: Proserpine Hospital
- Type: state heritage (built)
- Designated: 23 February 2001
- Reference no.: 601573
- Significant period: 1939–1940 (fabric); 1930s–1940s (historical); 1940s–ongoing (social)
- Significant components: ward – enclosed
- Builders: W C Kynaston

Proserpine Hospital is a heritage-listed public hospital at Herbert Street, Proserpine, Whitsunday Region, Queensland, Australia. It was designed by Hill & Taylor and built from 1939 to 1940 by W C Kynaston. It was added to the Queensland Heritage Register on 23 February 2001.

== History ==
The Proserpine Hospital on the corner of Herbert and Taylor Streets, Proserpine was constructed in 1939–40 to the design of prominent north Queensland architects, Hill and Taylor. The pavilions were built by W C Kynaston. It contains a group of three single storeyed brick pavilions located on a large block originally surrounded by formal gardens of manicured lawns and specimen trees.

The architectural firm of Hill and Taylor commenced in Cairns in 1925, although Richard Hill had been working in Cairns prior to this. Arthur John Henry Taylor was born in New South Wales and received his general and architectural education in Brisbane. Hill and Taylor continued in Cairns until 1941, with a Townsville office running from 1933 to 1939. The practice resumed in 1945 but was abandoned in 1952 mainly due to Taylor's ill-health.

The partnership of Hill and Taylor dominated north Queensland architecture between World War I and World War II. The firm was responsible for a number of prominent buildings in north Queensland including the Cairns City Council Building (1938), the Cairns Post Office (1930), the Johnstone Shire Hall in Innisfail (1938), the Barron Valley Hotel in Atherton (1940) and a number of country hospitals, including Mossman Hospital.

The Proserpine Hospital replaced an earlier timber hospital, which was built in 1911 on the old Bowen Road approximately 3 kilometres (1.9 mi) from the centre of town. The first hospital was constructed using funds raised by the local community. They continued to fund the running of the hospital, assisted by regular donations from the local Proserpine Shire Council, until June 1930 when it was forced to close as it seemed that the Proserpine community were unable to support it any longer. However, a year later the hospital re-opened when the community rallied together to raise the necessary funds.

Then in 1936 a decision was made by the Bowen Hospital Board, which had taken over the running of the hospital, to shift the hospital to its present site so that it would be closer to the town. A new hospital was designed in late 1936 to supplement the buildings shifted from the original site. A foundation stone was laid on 4 February 1939 by the Hon. Ned Hanlon. The new buildings, which were completed by 1940, consisted of a maternity ward, nursers quarters, male ward and an outpatients department.

These buildings consisted of a series of pavilions joined by covered walkways. They were all in the same style and constructed in red brick with high pitched bungalow roofs, which incorporated louvered ventilators in their gables. A feature of all the buildings were arcades with distinctive brick arches and concrete columns, and projecting front parapets that gave emphasis to the entrances.

In the early 1960s the front entrance parapets of the buildings were altered. This work varied slightly on each building but involved the removal of the ornate brickwork parapets and their replacement with plain triangular pediments or small hipped roofs. In addition the roofs which had been constructed in corrugated asbestos cement was replaced with galvanised iron.

The hospital was redeveloped in the late 1990s. When works were completed in 1999 much of the original hospital had been retained including the former maternity ward, male ward, and outpatients department. However, the Nursers's Quarters which fronted Herbert Street was demolished. The original 1923 Maternity Hospital, later Wardsman's House, was renovated to provide accommodation to medical staff.

== Description ==
The Proserpine Hospital is a group of three single storeyed brick pavilions located on a large block at the corner of Herbert and Taylor Streets, Proserpine. They are adjacent to new hospital buildings constructed in 1998–99. The new buildings all front Taylor Street.

The three brick pavilions which all face Herbert Street, the original front entrance of the hospital, include: the former Maternity Ward the former Men's Ward the former Outpatients Department

The former Maternity Ward was refurbished as part of the 1999 hospital redevelopment. The interior of the building has been altered and currently houses Allied Health (i.e. dental health/mental health/physiotheraphy/speech therapy and child health etc).

The ward is linked to the former Men's Ward by a covered way. The walkway has been partitioned into small rooms, which are currently used for storage. The Men's Ward is also used for storage. The building comprises two wards and an operating theatre.

The former Outpatients Department was inspected internally and found to be intact. The building, now vacant, had an area for administration, an examination room, a consulting room, a laboratory, an X-ray facility, and an outpatients treatment area. There were no changes made to the building as part of the 1999 hospital redevelopment. The building is currently closed to the public.

Elements of the original landscaping around the buildings has been retained, including open grass areas and specimen trees of Moreton Bay fig, mango, Norfolk Island pine, and queen palms.

== Heritage listing ==
Proserpine Hospital was listed on the Queensland Heritage Register on 23 February 2001 having satisfied the following criteria.

The place is important in demonstrating the evolution or pattern of Queensland's history.

The Proserpine Hospital is important in demonstrating the principal characteristics of a particular class of cultural place. The Proserpine Hospital is significant as a group of hospital buildings, designed in the tradition of separate pavilions which was part of a philosophy of hospital design.

The Proserpine Hospital has a special association with the Proserpine community. The community was responsible for funding the construction and operation of an earlier timber hospital in the town. Today, the community continues to support its local hospital and, when the hospital was redeveloped in the late 1990s, the Proserpine community were adamant that the original buildings be retained on the site.

The Proserpine Hospital has a special association with the work of the prominent architects Hill & Taylor, who worked in north Queensland in the period between World Wars and designed a number of country hospitals.

The place is important in demonstrating the principal characteristics of a particular class of cultural places.

The Proserpine Hospital is important in demonstrating the principal characteristics of a particular class of cultural place. The Proserpine Hospital is significant as a group of hospital buildings, designed in the tradition of separate pavilions which was part of a philosophy of hospital design.

The place has a strong or special association with a particular community or cultural group for social, cultural or spiritual reasons.

The Proserpine Hospital has a special association with the Proserpine community. The community was responsible for funding the construction and operation of an earlier timber hospital in the town. Today, the community continues to support its local hospital and, when the hospital was redeveloped in the late 1990s, the Proserpine community were adamant that the original buildings be retained on the site.

The place has a special association with the life or work of a particular person, group or organisation of importance in Queensland's history.

The Proserpine Hospital has a special association with the work of the prominent architects Hill & Taylor, who worked in north Queensland in the period between World Wars and designed a number of country hospitals.
