= Hill & Taylor =

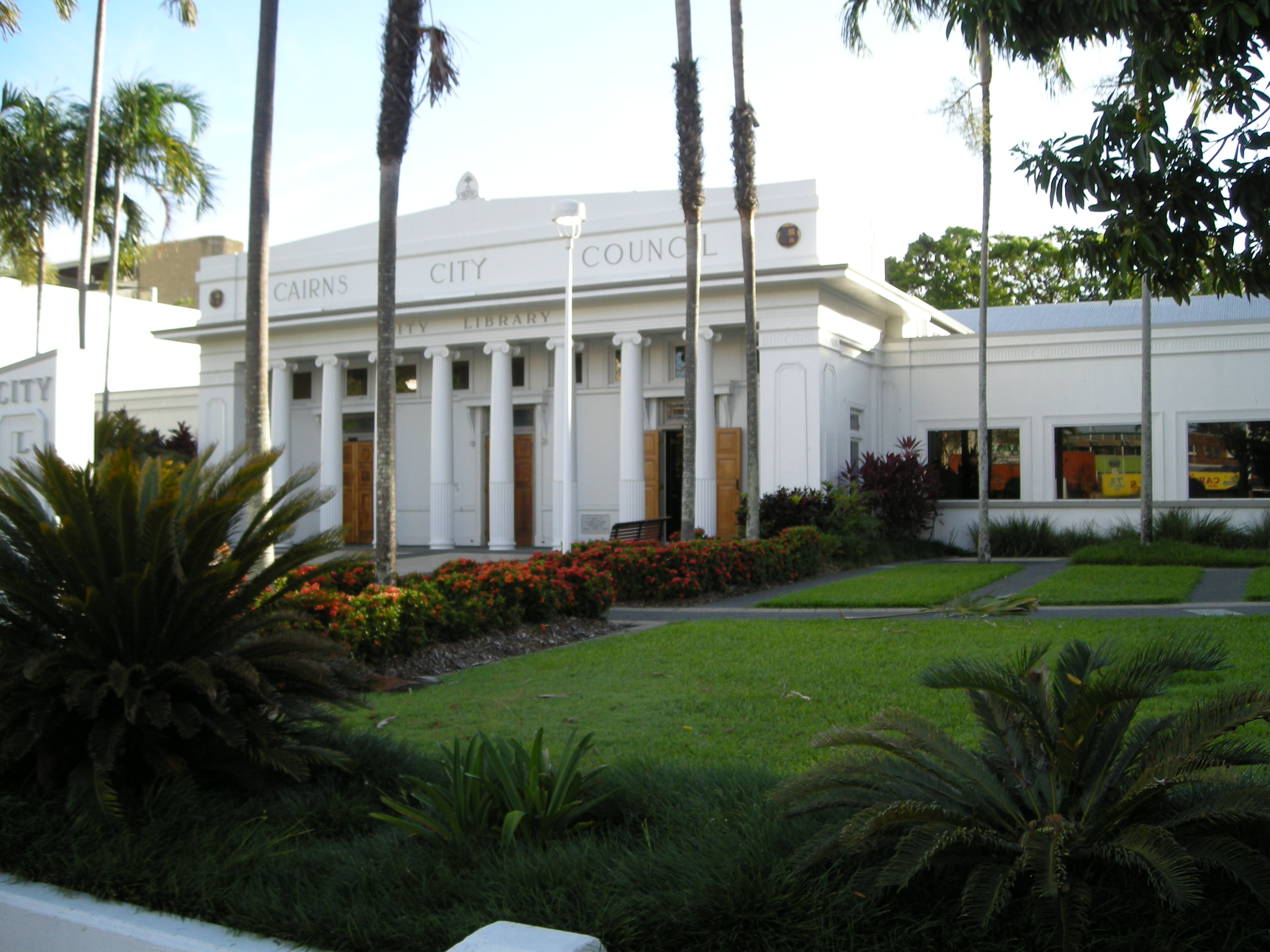
Cairns City Council Chambers, 2009

Hill & Taylor were an architectural partnership in Cairns, Queensland, Australia. A number of their works are now heritage-listed.

== History ==
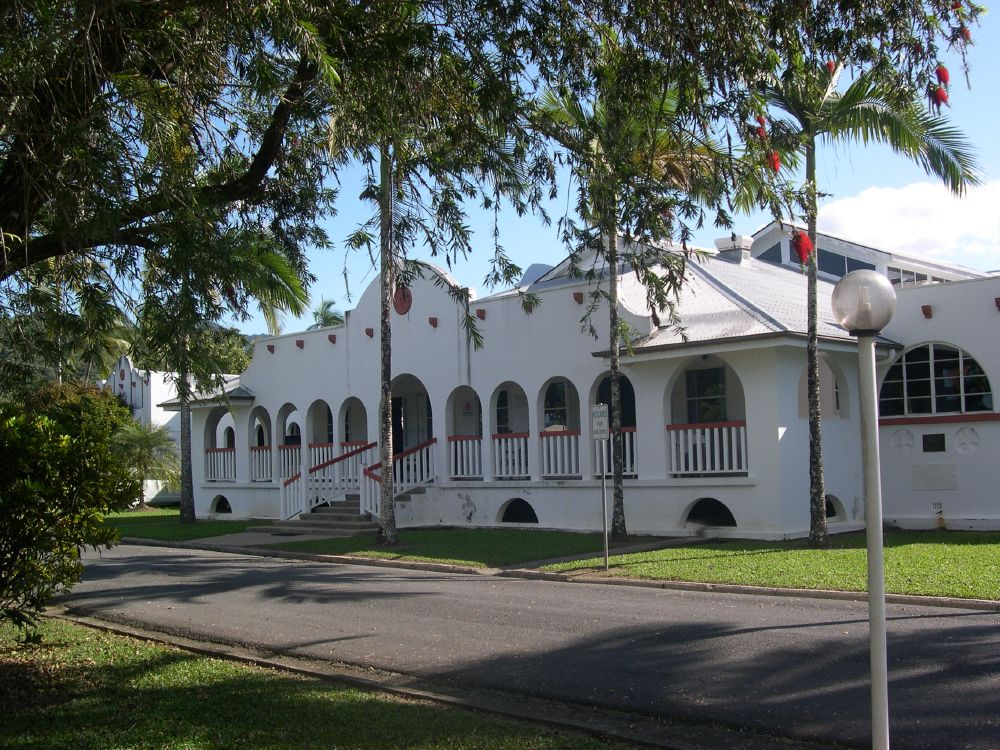
Mossman District Hospital, 2007

Richard Hill and Arthur John Henry Taylor were in partnership in Cairns from 1927 to c. 1940, with a branch office in Townsville from 1933 to 1939. The partnership was resumed in 1945 but was dissolved in 1952. During the interwar years Hill and Taylor developed an extensive practice in northern Queensland.

== Significant works ==
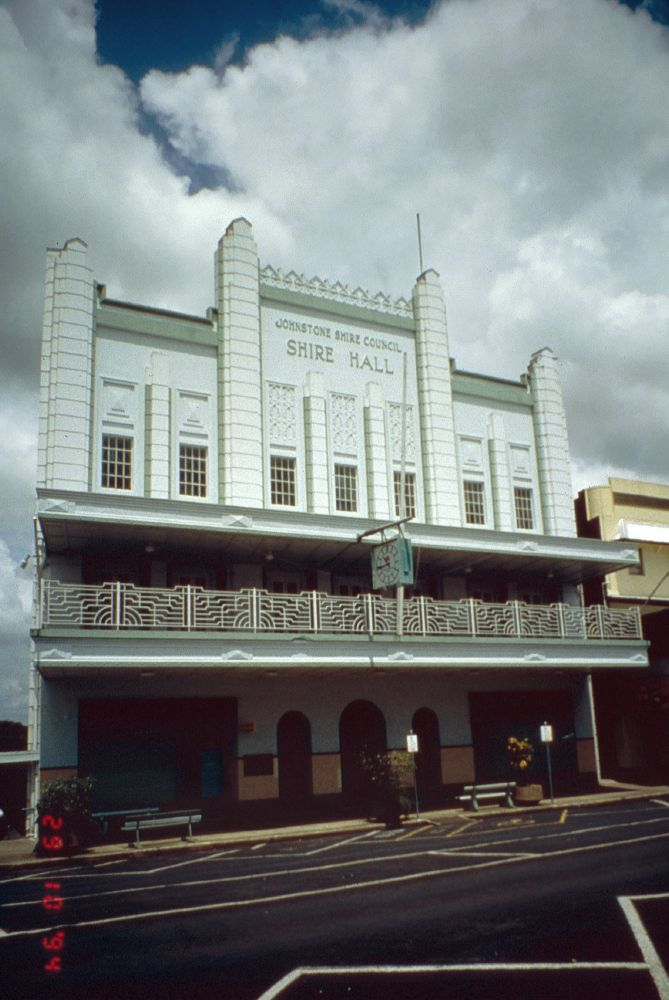
Johnstone Shire Hall, 1994

Significant works of Hill & Taylor include:

- Cairns City Council Chambers (1929–1930)
- Cairns Post Office (1930)
- Mossman District Hospital (circa 1930)
- Johnstone Shire Hall at Innisfail (1935–1938)
- Emergency operating theatre at Boulia (1936)
- Mossman Shire Hall and Douglas Shire Council Chambers (1936–1937)
- Nurses' quarters at Cairns (1937)
- Mareeba Hospital (1937)
- Proserpine Hospital (1939–1940)
- Barron Valley Hotel at Atherton (1940)
