= Cairns City Council Chambers =

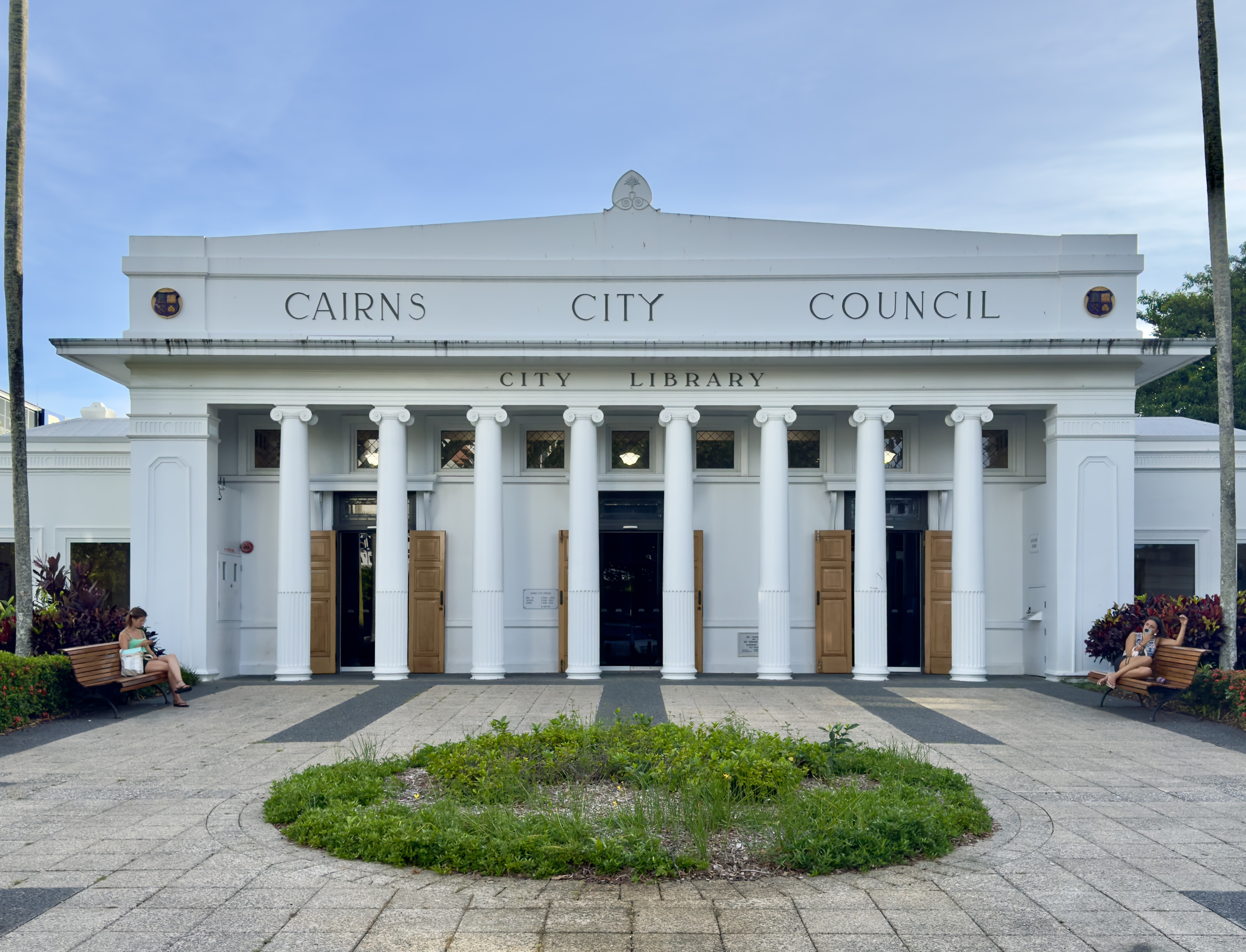
- Cairns City Council Chambers (now City Library), 2025

- Location within Queensland Location within Australia
- 16.9204°S 145.7752°E
- Location: 151 Abbott Street, Cairns City, Cairns, Cairns Region, Queensland, Australia

History
- Design period: 1919–1930s (interwar period)
- Built: 1929–1930

Site notes
- Architect: Hill & Taylor
- Architectural style: Federal architecture

Queensland Heritage Register
- Official name: Cairns City Council Chambers
- Type: state heritage (built, landscape)
- Designated: 5 October 1998
- Reference no.: 601576
- Significant period: 1920s–1930s (historical); 1929–ongoing (social); 1930s–1960s (fabric)
- Significant components: views to, trees/plantings, strong room, council chamber/meeting room, visitor's area, foyer – entrance, office/s, furniture/fittings, garden/grounds
- Builders: Alex McKenzie

Cairns City Council Chambers is a heritage-listed former town hall and now council library at 151 Abbott Street, Cairns City, Cairns, Cairns Region, Queensland, Australia. It was designed by Hill & Taylor and built from 1929 to 1930 by Alex McKenzie. It was added to the Queensland Heritage Register on 5 October 1998. It is now home to the Cairns City Library.

== History ==
The Cairns City Council Chambers was constructed in 1929–1930 and is a substantial reinforced concrete structure located on a large corner site surrounded by parkland. The building was erected during the third major phase of Cairns' development, between the First and Second World Wars, at which time the city's status as the principal port of Far North Queensland was consolidated and the city centre virtually re-built.

Cairns was established officially in October 1876 as a port to service the newly discovered Hodgkinson goldfields. In this first phase of Cairns' development there was a small flurry of building activity (mostly shanties and tent houses), but the town competed with both Cooktown and Port Douglas for the Hodgkinson trade, and made little progress until the establishment of a local sugar industry and the opening up of the Atherton Tablelands' mineral fields, in the early 1880s. The 1885 announcement that Cairns was to be the terminus for the Cairns-to-Herberton railway established the town as the principal port in the region. These boosts to the local economy in the 1880s generated a second building and development phase, during which the early temporary structures were replaced by more substantial timber buildings.

Whilst a number of masonry and reinforced concrete commercial buildings were erected in Cairns in the years immediately preceding the First World War, the third major phase of Cairns' development was during the 1920s and 1930s. The Cairns hinterland Soldier Settlement Schemes of the 1920s, the completion of the North Coast rail link to Brisbane in 1924, the opening of the Gillies Highway and the Captain Cook Highway, the continued success of the local sugar industry, the expansion of wharf facilities, the extensive re-building necessitated by cyclones in the 1920s, and the poor condition of earlier timber structures, combined to produce unprecedented building activity in Cairns. The city centre in particular was dominated until the 1980s by masonry and reinforced concrete structures of the interwar period, and in this respect was markedly different from other Queensland towns and cities established in the 19th century.

Important civic buildings of this time, most of which were designed with classical detailing intended to re-affirm the power and presence of government in the community, include the Cairns City Council Chambers, former Cairns Court House and Public Offices (now Cairns Regional Gallery), the former Cairns Customs House, former Cairns Post Office, former Cairns Telegraph Office and Cairns State High School. Other prominent buildings of the period also designed with classical detailing include the Cairns Masonic Temple and the Cairns Post building. The construction of these buildings reflected the confidence of the Queensland Government and the local community in the growth of Cairns as an important regional centre during the interwar period.

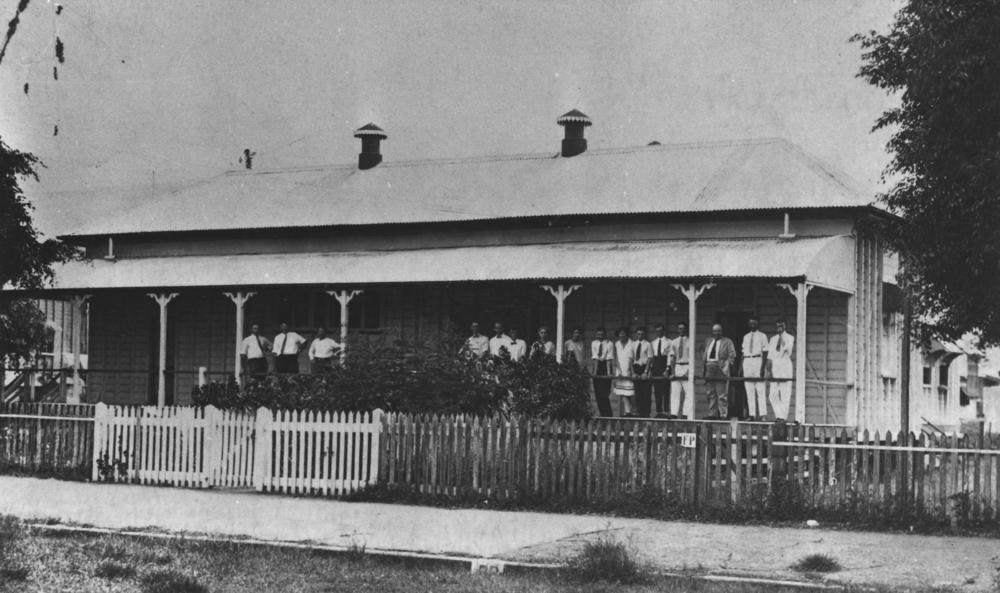
Cairns Town Council Chambers built in timber, circa 1929

The Cairns Divisional Board was established in 1879 by the Divisional Boards Act of that year, later becoming the Cairns Shire Council and then the Mulgrave Shire Council. In 1885 the Cairns Municipal Council was set up to administer the town area, and an allotment of land was set aside as a municipal reserve some blocks away from the main settlement of lower Abbott Street, on the corner of Aplin Street. The Cairns Municipal Council Chambers, a timber building, was constructed on the site, and in 1886 the Council applied for a public market reserve on land adjoining the municipal reserve fronting Lake Street, with a roadway entrance from Abbott Street. This was established in 1886, and in 1893 one allotment of the public market reserve fronting Lake Street was surrendered for a fire brigade station use, and two smaller allotments fronting Abbott Street were included as part of the public market reserve, resulting in the current site configuration. In June 1940 the previous reserves were cancelled and the site was gazetted as a reserve for local government purposes. In July of that year, a deed of grant upon trust for local government purposes was issued to the Cairns City Council for the site.

The Cairns Municipal Council became the Cairns Town Council on 31 March 1903, which in turn became the Cairns City Council on 13 October 1923. In 1926, Cairns celebrated its 50th anniversary.

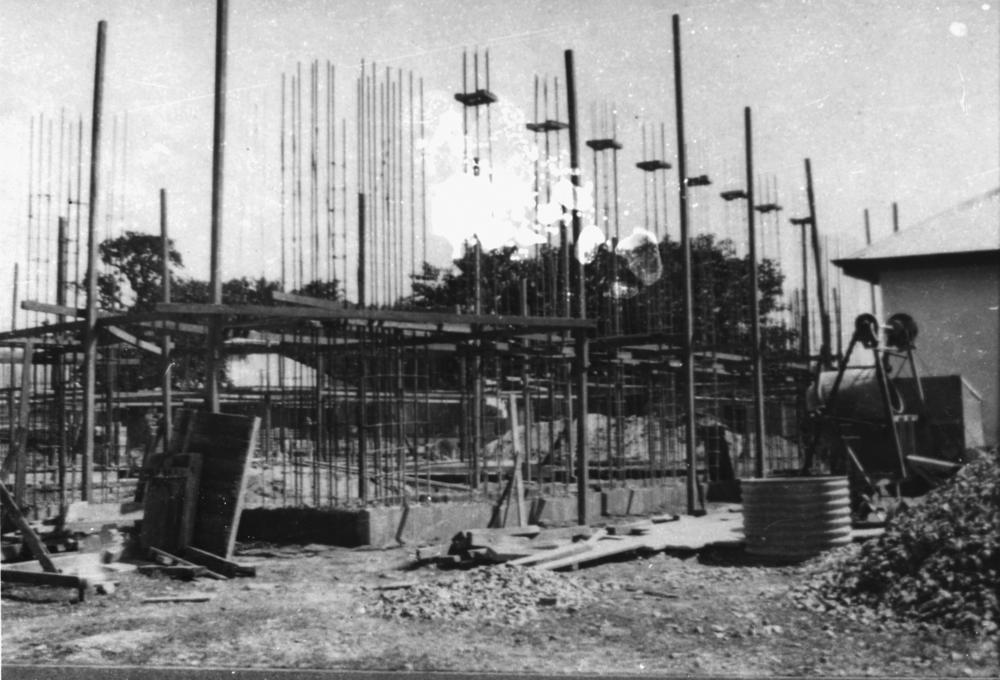
Construction of the city council chambers in Cairns, 1929

The Cairns City Council Chambers were constructed in 1929–1930, replacing the timber council chambers. The Cairns City Council Chambers were designed by the architectural partnership of Hill and Taylor, who were prominent local architects working in North Queensland during the interwar period. Hill and Taylor practiced in Cairns from 1927 to 1933, and in Townsville from 1933-c. 1940, however Richard Hill had been practicing as an architect in Cairns from 1919. Prior to his partnership, Arthur John Taylor had worked for Richard Hill from 1925 to 1927 after having been employed by the Queensland Government.

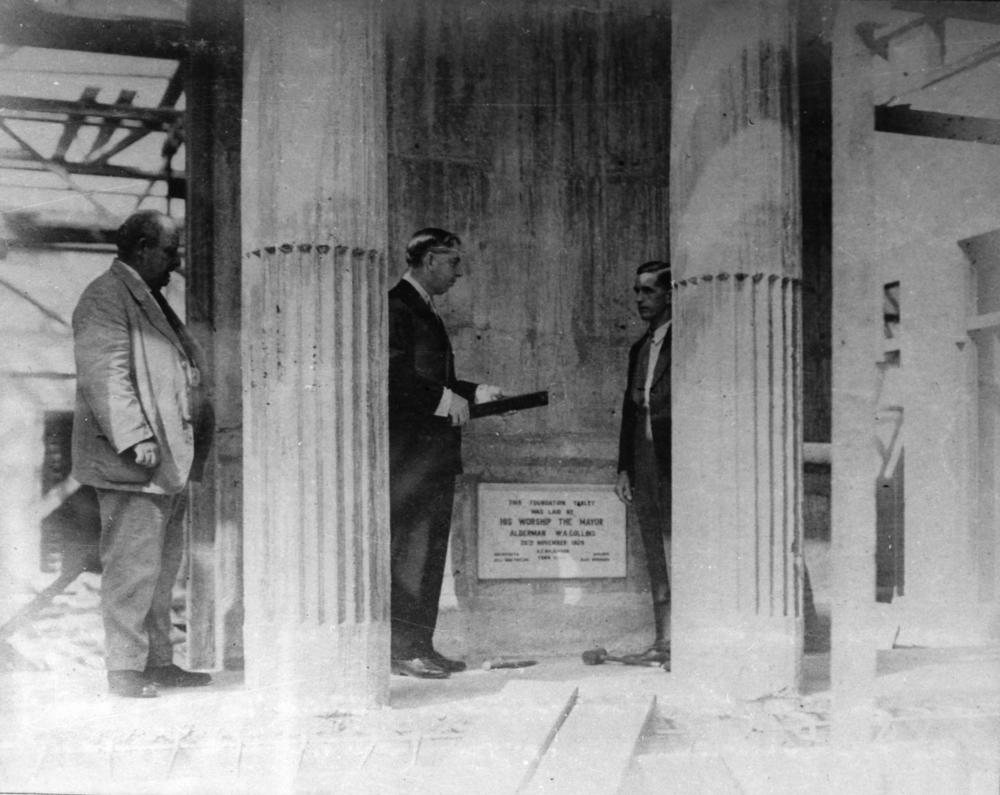
Foundation stone ceremony at the new city council chambers in Cairns, 1929

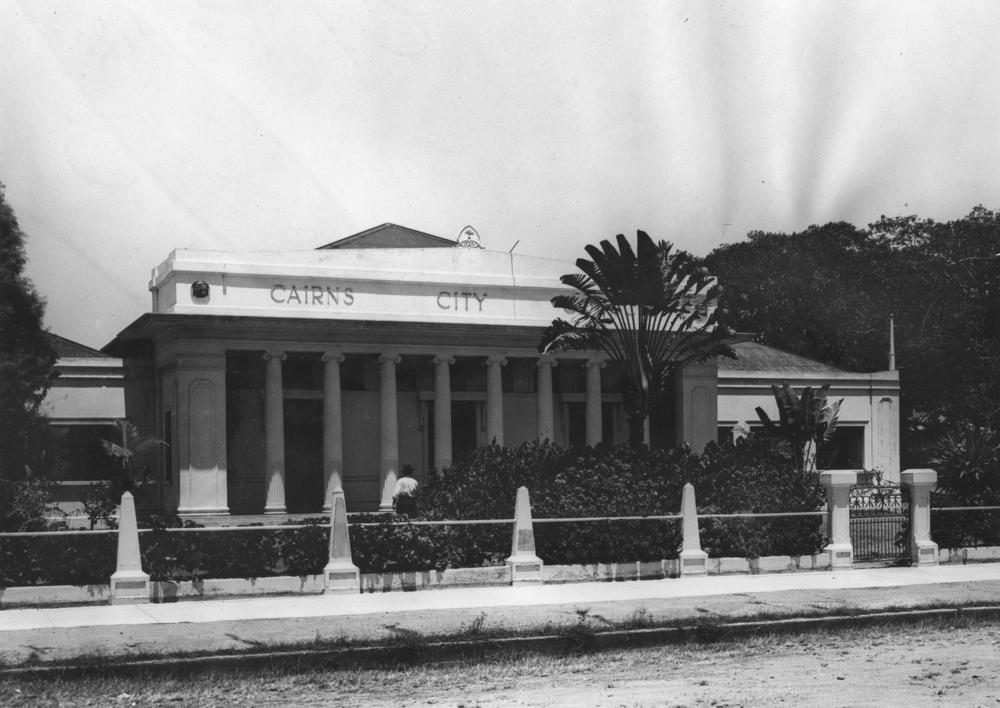
Cairns City Council Chambers, 1948

The builder of the Cairns City Council Chambers was Mr Alex McKenzie, and the foundation stone was laid by Mayor Alderman WA Collinson on 20 November 1929. In December 1929 the building was estimated to cost approximately £15,000. The Cairns City Council Chambers originally comprised a T-shaped plan with a central columned vestibule (pronaos) to Abbott Street, flanked on either side by three bays of verandah (now enclosed) with each section having a separate hipped roof. The building was extended c. 1961 by a further three bays to either side with matching facade detailing. The rear verandahs were also enclosed, and the original timber floors were replaced with concrete slabs. The building was extended with infill at the rear corners, with the northern extension completed in 1969 and the southern in 1975. Major refurbishment was carried out in 1979–80, with the mezzanine floor added, and suspended ceilings installed.

The building appears to have originally had a picket fence to the Abbott Street frontage, which was replaced during the 1930s by a fence with concrete piers and metal gates which was in keeping with the original design proposal for the building. This fence is no longer extant, but its base may survive in the form of an existing concrete upstand along the Abbott Street boundary. The building is now fronted by the Centenary Forecourt, which was opened in 1985 to celebrate 100 years of local government in Cairns.

In the late 1990, the building was redesigned and reopened in 1999 as the Cairns City Library.

== Description ==
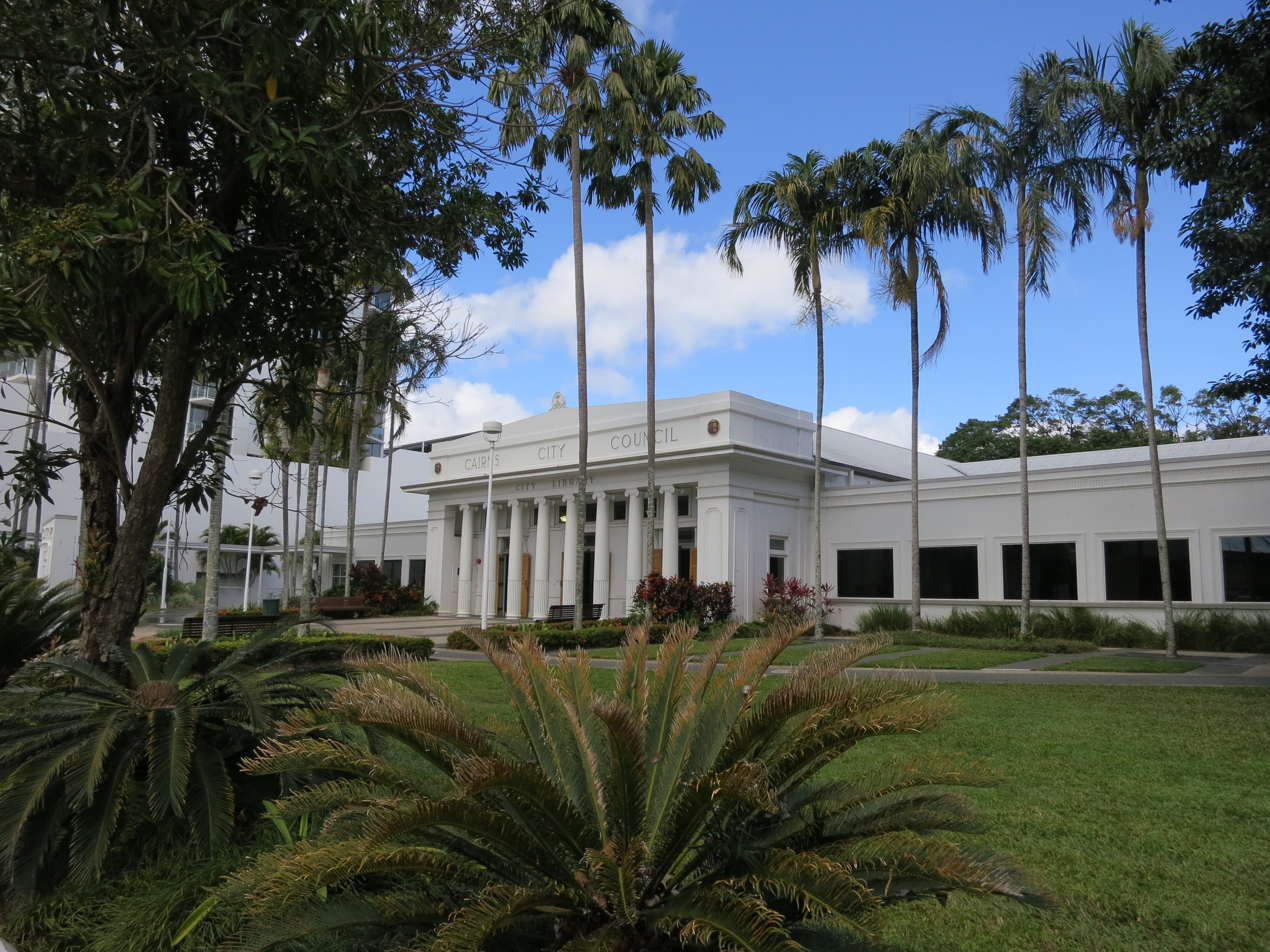
Cairns City Library, 2012

The Cairns City Council Chambers, located on a large site bounded by Abbott, Aplin and Lake Streets, is surrounded by parkland with mature trees including figs, queen palms and traveller's palms. The single-storeyed reinforced concrete structure, designed with classical detailing, has separate hipped roofs clad in ribbed metal sheeting and partly concealed behind a parapet.

The symmetrical main entrance faces Abbott Street to the northeast, with a forecourt area fronting a stylised pronaos. The pronaos consists of eight Ionic columns in antis, with fluting to the base of the shaft of each column, and the pilasters at either end have stylised detailing with a coat of arms towards the top. The entablature has a wide cornice formed by a projecting eave which aligns with the remainder of the building, and the pediment has the name CAIRNS CITY COUNCIL and is surmounted by an acroteria at the apex.

The pronaos has three doorways opening to the foyer. Each doorway has expressed architraves, the lintel of which projects from the wall face and is supported by scrolled brackets. The original doors have been replaced with aluminium framed glazed doors, however the leadlight fanlights survive intact. A row of high level windows located above the doorhead have been closed over, but the window surrounds remain. A marble foundation plaque is fixed to the base of the wall.

The pronaos is flanked on either side by enclosed verandahs. Each verandah comprises six bays (the original section being only three bays) which consist of rectangular openings with expressed sill and architraves, and which have been infilled with glazing. The enclosed verandah is surmounted by a parapet with a stylised frieze, and flanked by stylised pilasters at either end.

The building has been extended to either side and at the rear corners, and the central roof section is higher than the flanking roof sections. The architectural detailing of the enclosed verandahs fronting Abbott Street is continued to both side elevations, with the parapet wrapping around to the rear of the building. The rear of the building has hipped roof sections forming deep eaves, with stylised corner pilasters projecting through to form corner parapets.

The rear of the central section has a skillion roofed verandah, enclosed with multi-paned timber windows above sill height, either side of a central portico. The portico has a parapet with corner pilasters, and an entablature with a wide cornice formed by a projecting eave which aligns with the adjoining verandahs. The pilasters frame a rectangular opening which is flanked by small Tuscan columns. The main roof has bracketed eaves, and narrow leadlight windows are located above the verandah roof, lighting the interior of the Council Chamber behind. The original toilet blocks are extant (with a plant being added to the roof of the northern toilet block) and flank the enclosed side verandahs of the rear central section.

Internally, the building has a large central office and public enquiries area with non-original partitions fronting the pronaos entry to Abbott Street, with the former strong room behind, and the Council Chamber at the rear. The original verandahs returning along either side of the Council Chamber are extant, however they have been enclosed and additions constructed to infill the rear corners of the structure. The side wings retain some of the original planning and room layout, but have also been extended to either side. Some of the original French doors and fanlights, which opened onto verandahs from these rooms, survive intact. Suspended ceilings have been installed throughout most of the building, however a mezzanine level has been created above the strong room area and the original coffered plaster ceiling is visible.

The Council Chamber has cedar wall panelling to plate rail height, with painted wall surface above. The room also has paired cedar panelled doors and architraves, and leadlight windows. The southern wall of the Council Chamber has been altered with non-original timber joinery, and the room has a suspended ceiling which blocks the high level windows and obscures the overall proportions of the room.

The building is surrounded by extensive grounds, including mature trees and several flower beds. Driveway access and car parking is along the southern boundary of the site, and a second driveway enters off Aplin Street and accesses the rear portico. A large forecourt forms the entrance to the building from Abbott Street, and a low concrete upstand which runs along the Abbott Street boundary may be the base of the original concrete fence.

== Heritage listing ==
Cairns City Council Chambers was listed on the Queensland Heritage Register on 5 October 1998 having satisfied the following criteria.

The place is important in demonstrating the evolution or pattern of Queensland's history.

The Cairns City Council Chambers survives as an important illustration of the growth and rebuilding of Cairns in the interwar years, when Cairns was transformed from a late 19th century town to a progressive, post-war city. In particular, the place illustrates the local community's confidence in Cairns as an important regional centre after the First World War, and the elevation of Cairns from town to city status. The site has sustained a continued local government presence in Cairns since 1885, when the Cairns Municipal Council was established and the first chambers constructed.

The place is important in demonstrating the principal characteristics of a particular class of cultural places.

It is an important example of the work of prominent North Queensland architectural partnership of Hill and Taylor.

The place is important because of its aesthetic significance.

The Cairns City Council Chambers has considerable aesthetic and architectural significance, and together with its surrounding grounds and mature plantings, imbue a formal expression of classical interwar public architecture adapted to suit a tropical climate. The building makes a considerable contribution to the Cairns streetscape, and is an important member of a group of classically detailed interwar civic buildings designed to re-affirm the power and presence of government in the community.

As an integral member of a group of interwar civic buildings designed with classical detailing, the Cairns City Council Chambers contributes markedly to the city's sense of identity and history.

The place has a strong or special association with a particular community or cultural group for social, cultural or spiritual reasons.

The building has a strong association with the Cairns City Council and the Cairns community.
