= Johnstone Shire Hall =

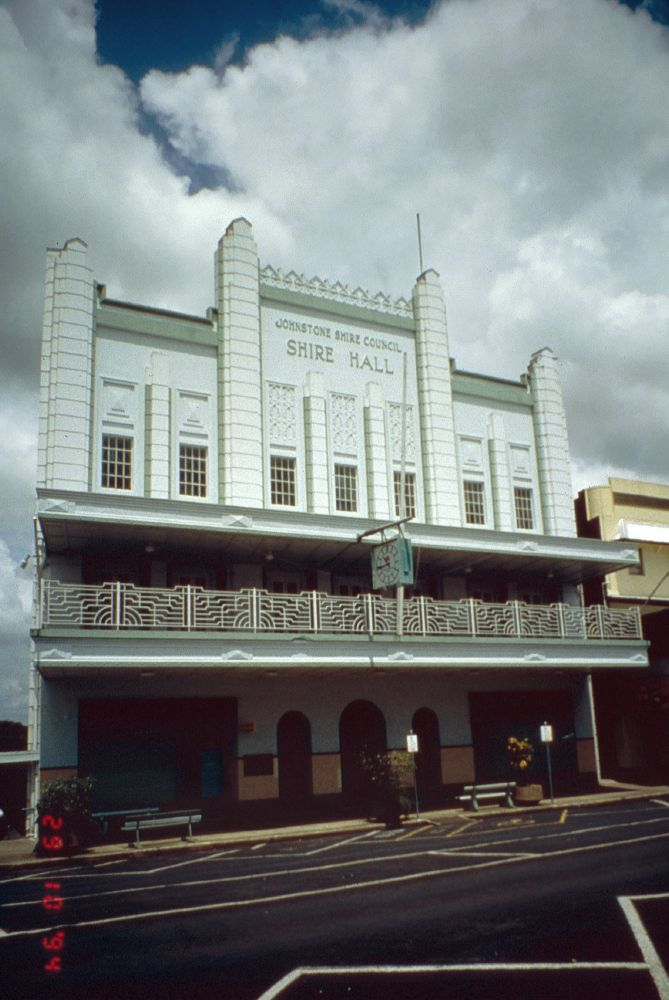
- Johnstone Shire Hall, 1994

- Location within Queensland Location within Australia
- 17.5231°S 146.0302°E
- Location: 70 Rankin Street, Innisfail, Cassowary Coast Region, Queensland, Australia

History
- Design period: 1919–1930s (interwar period)
- Built: 1935–1938
- Built for: Johnstone Shire Council

Site notes
- Architect: Hill & Taylor

Queensland Heritage Register
- Official name: Johnstone Shire Hall
- Type: state heritage (built)
- Designated: 13 January 1995
- Reference no.: 601579
- Significant period: 1930s (historical); 1930s (fabric); 1935–ongoing (social)
- Significant components: tower – fly, views to, office/s, furniture/fittings, shop/s, hall, foyer – entrance, council chamber/meeting room
- Builders: Van Leeuwen Brothers

Johnstone Shire Hall is a heritage-listed town hall at 70 Rankin Street, Innisfail, Cassowary Coast Region, Queensland, Australia. It was designed by Hill & Taylor and built from 1935 to 1938 by Van Leeuwen Brothers. It was added to the Queensland Heritage Register on 13 January 1995.

== History ==
The Johnstone Shire Hall was constructed for the Johnstone Shire Council in Innisfail from 1935 to 8, by the Van Leeuwen brothers to the design of Messrs Hill and Taylor at a cost of about £53,000.

The Innisfail area was settled by cedar-cutters, with the first major planting of sugar cane occurring in 1880. The town was laid out at the junction of the South Johnstone and North Johnstone Rivers in 1881, and was known as Junction Point. The name of the town was changed to Geraldton in 1883, and to Innisfail in 1910.

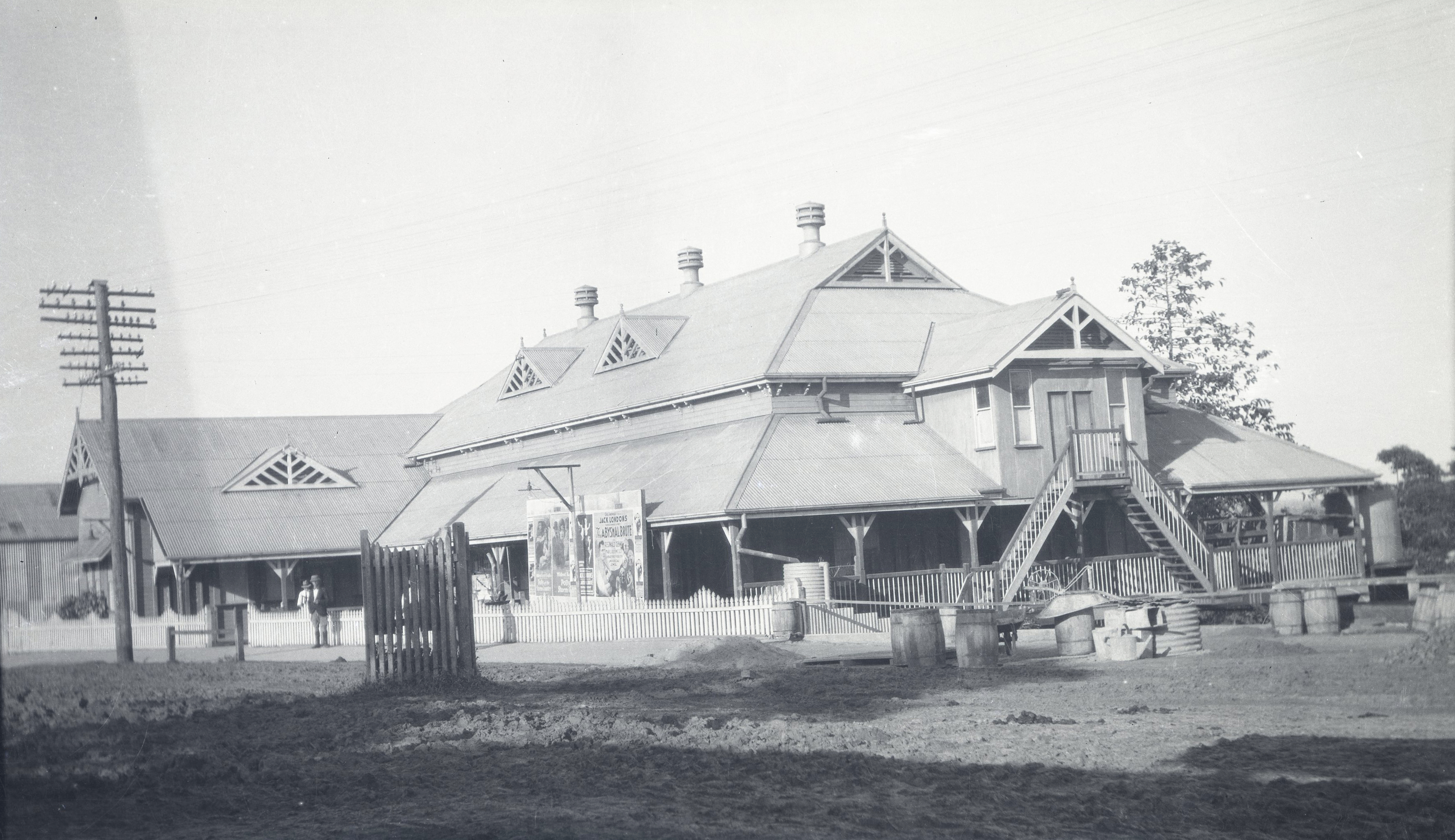
Johnston Shire Hall, circa 1930

Innisfail was devastated first by a record flood in 1913, then by a cyclone in 1918, which destroyed many of the town's timber buildings. Despite these setbacks, the town prospered and opened its third sugar mill in 1916. By the 1920s, the Innisfail sugar industry was producing vast quantities of sugar cane and record yields of sugar. The prosperity of the town was reflected in the many buildings erected in the 1920s and 1930s, including many concrete buildings such as the first wing of the hospital, the Roman Catholic Church, the Commonwealth Bank and many other commercial premises. Also important in the town's development was the opening of the Jubilee Bridge in 1923, linking the town with East Innisfail and Mourilyan, and the Daradgee Railway Bridge in 1924.

The Johnstone Shire Hall was constructed when the previous building was destroyed by fire in December 1932. This previous building had been used for theatrical productions and therefore the community were anxious to see a replacement constructed promptly. However council disagreements, Queensland Government interference and a change of shire council mean that it was many years before plans for the new Hall were presented and accepted. Messrs Hill and Taylor were commissioned for the design of the building in 1935. They were prominent local architects working in North Queensland between World War I and World War II. Other public buildings by this firm include the Cairns City Council (1929), Cairns Post Office (c. 1930) and Proserpine Hospital (1939–40) and the Barron Valley Hotel (1940).

The supervising contractors were the Van Leeuwen brothers, who had arrived in Innisfail from Holland in 1918, they were responsible for most of the major construction work in the town from this date, including the Water Tower, the National Bank, Hotel Grand Central, Queens Hotel, Bank of New South Wales and the Commonwealth Bank.

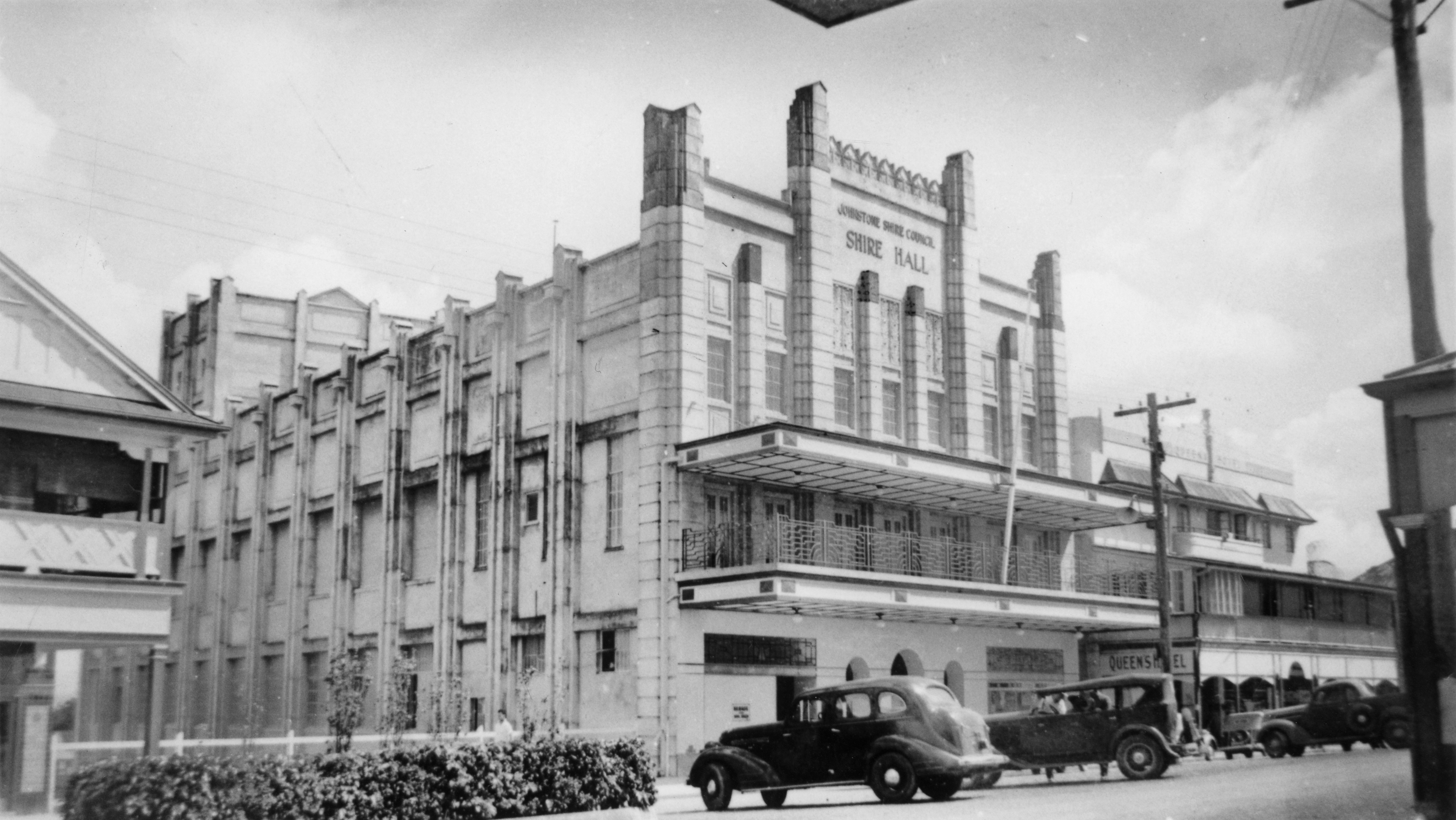
Johnstone Shire Hall, circa 1947

Hill and Taylor and the Van Leeuwen brothers proposed the cost of the building was to be £36,830. However, over the next few years the cost of the building was to rise to over £50,000, to the considerable alarm of the community and the Treasury Department who were partially funding the venture. A provision of the Treasury's involvement was the use of the unemployed on either day or contract labour, therefore none of the contractors' own staff were employed on the project. The building was ready for occupation in 1938, and after five years in temporary accommodation the Johnstone Shire Council were able to operate from their own offices.

== Description ==
The Johnstone Shire Hall is a two storeyed re-inforced concrete building with semi-basement containing shire offices, a hall and two shops. The main facade has a stepped parapet with four banded pilasters defining bays featuring moulded decorative panels representing sugar cane. There is a cantilevered awning over the street with a balcony above, access to the balcony is via French doors. The balcony has a wrought-iron balustrade. The main entrance has three arched doorways through which is the ceramic tiled entrance foyer.

The upper storey features a panelled foyer and auditorium, with a stage and fly tower. The hall has an elliptical arched fibrous cement ceiling, supported on piers panelled with walnut and decorated with plaster fluting and volutes. The lighting system is a combination of many copper framed pendant fixtures with opal glass, and a system of concealed trough lighting providing indirect illumination.

== Heritage listing ==
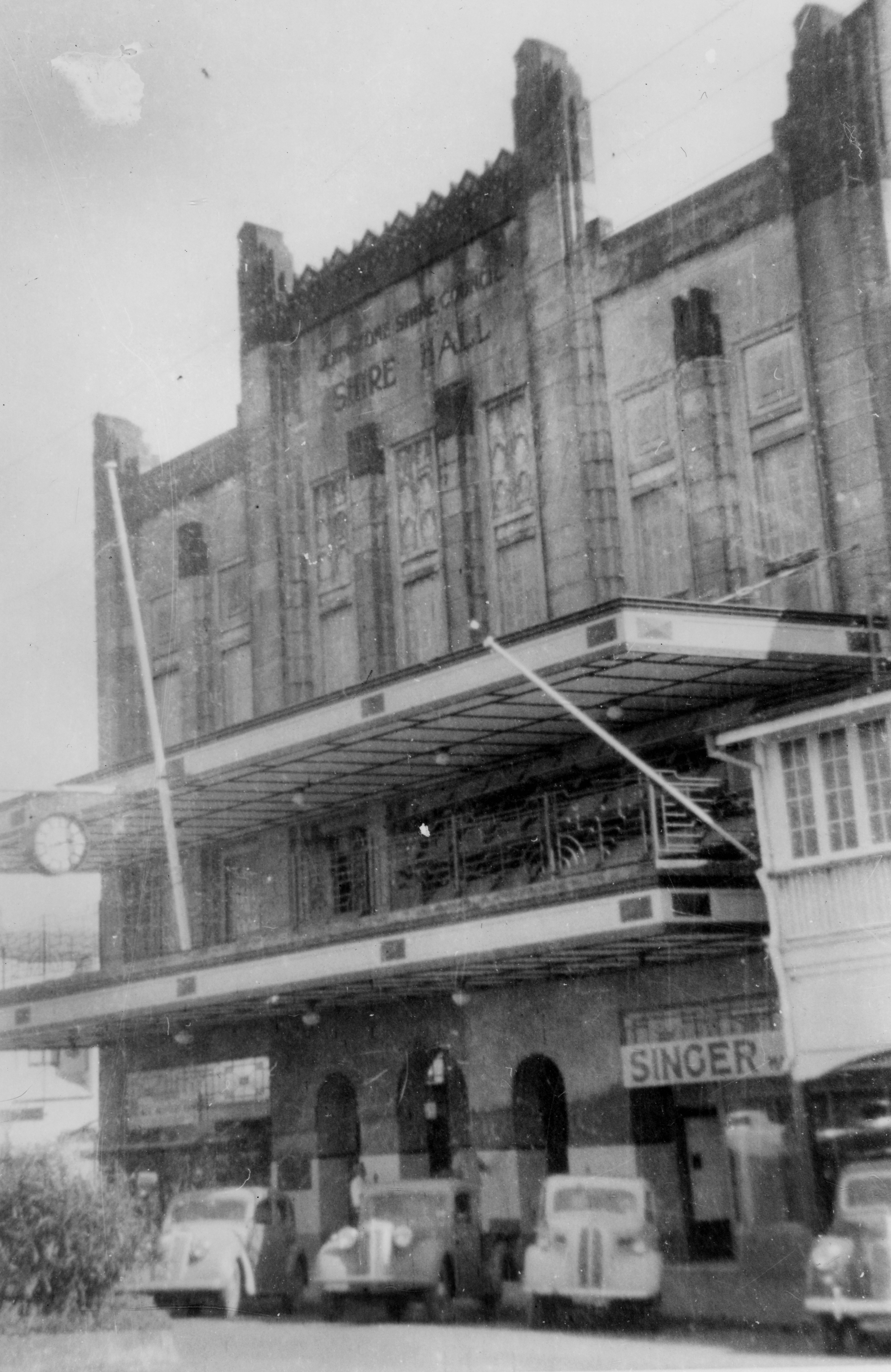
Upper storey, the arched entry and the Art Deco facade, circa 1947

Johnstone Shire Hall was listed on the Queensland Heritage Register on 13 January 1995 having satisfied the following criteria.

The place is important in demonstrating the evolution or pattern of Queensland's history.

The Johnstone Shire Hall is a substantial inter-war building which illustrates the unprecedented era of prosperity accompanying the expansion of the sugar industry in the Burdekin region.

The place is important in demonstrating the principal characteristics of a particular class of cultural places.

The Johnstone Shire Hall, constructed 1935–38, is significant as a good and intact example of regional public buildings with Art Deco detailing, featuring locally inspired motifs. The Shire Hall is significant as a building designed by the architectural partnership of Hill and Taylor, prominent local architects in North Queensland between the first and second World Wars.

The place is important because of its aesthetic significance.

The building is an important element of the Rankin Street streetscape.

The place has a strong or special association with a particular community or cultural group for social, cultural or spiritual reasons.

It has significance to the local community as the civic centre of Innisfail.
