= Tom See Poy =

Chinese-Australian businessman (1853–1926)

- 譚仕沛
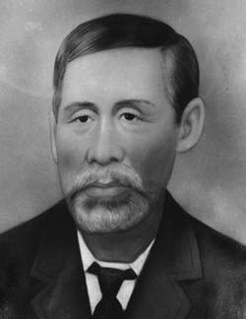
- Tom See Poy
- Born: Taam Sze-Pui
- Occupation: Chinese-Australian storekeeper

Chinese name
- Traditional Chinese: 譚仕沛
- Simplified Chinese: 谭仕沛
Transcriptions
Standard Mandarin
- Hanyu Pinyin: Tán Shìpèi
- Wade–Giles: T'an^{2} Shih^{4}P'ei^{4}
Yue: Cantonese
- Jyutping: Taam^{4} Si^{6}Pui^{3}

Tom See Poy, also known as Taam Sze-Pui, (circa 1853 – 18 April 1926) was a Chinese Australian storekeeper in Innisfail, Queensland, Australia. At its peak, his department store See Poy & Sons was one of the foremost department stores in north Queensland.

== Early life ==
Taam Sze-Pui was born about 1853 at Ny Chuen, Nam Hui district, Kwonglung, South China, the second child and eldest son of a peasant farmer In Vong and his wife Lo Hoy. His childhood was one of poverty and limited education. Aged 17 he immigrated to Queensland with his father and a brother in the hope of finding gold.

With the discovery of gold on the Palmer River in 1872, many Chinese men, including Taam Sze Pui (Tom See Poy, an anglicisation of his name that he came to adopt), migrated to work on the Palmer goldfields. Tom See Poy spent five years unsuccessfully searching for gold.

Many Chinese also established market gardens and set up businesses catering for new arrivals. Chinese migrants moved between settlements and lived throughout the north on the Hodgkinson goldfields, on the Atherton Tableland working in the timber industry and in the small settlements of Smithfield and Cairns in 1876.

In 1880, the Johnstone River district was identified as suitable for agriculture and opened up for settlement and sugar production. Workers came from around the north, including Tom See Poy and other Chinese men. By 1886, the Chinese community at Geraldton (later Innisfail) had grown rapidly, almost matching the Chinese population at Cairns (the largest outside Brisbane). They worked in the sugar and banana industry, the latter rivalling sugar as the region's primary economic activity. Many Chinese men were involved in the banana industry, including Tom See Poy and Tam Sie whose early success with bananas saw them become leading businessmen investing in property and farming.

== Career ==
In July 1883, Tom See Poy and two other Chinese men set up the Kam Who store at Mourilyan and then moved to Innisfail. A few years later, Tom bought out the others and was still operating the Innisfail store when it was damaged in the 1918 Innisfail cyclone. Although Tom See Poy's initial business activities were modest, See Poy & Sons grew rapidly under the management of his children by the 1920s. Tom See Poy retired in 1925 and died the following year leaving an estate of £32,576. All but the youngest of his five children played a role in the store during their adult life. Eldest son Johnstone became the company director but his two sisters also had a significant role in the business as well.

See Poy and Sons became the largest department store in North Queensland, with international connections. It catered for a wide clientele in Innisfail and beyond, selling everything from toys and shoes to groceries, furniture and cars. Under the directorship of Johnstone See Poy the business extended its floor area and increased its range of merchandise, and in 1929, purchased a car dealership. The following year the firm embarked upon a significant upgrade of its existing timber store and built Innisfail's biggest department store. The new two storey building was constructed of reinforced concrete - a popular modern material being increasingly used at the time because of its ability to withstand cyclones and floods. The new store was the equal of similar establishments in other parts of Queensland, and also of the Chinese Australian owned and operated emporia that dominated the skylines of Hong Kong, Guangzhou and Shanghai between 1907 and 1931. (The emporia owned by the Chinese Australian Guo and Ma families are two examples of those operating in Hong Kong and China.) At its peak See Poy & Sons was one of the foremost department stores in north Queensland. The firm enjoyed significant customer loyalty and successfully withstood mercantile competition from the mail order service of McWhirters in Brisbane, from Penney's variety store, from other Innisfail stores, and from department stores situated in the large cities throughout north Queensland.

== Later life ==
Tom See Poy retired from an active role in the family business in 1925. He published an autobiography My Life and Work that same year, authored under his Chinese name Tam Sze-Pui and written in both Chinese and English.

He died in Sydney on 18 April 1926. He was honoured by the townspeople of Innisfail with a very long funeral procession to the Innisfail Cemetery, where he was buried according to the rites of the Church of England.

== Legacy ==
Tom See Poy's department store continued to operate until the early 1980s. In 1981, the whole See Poy family was honoured by the Queensland Government with a commemorative plaque for their contribution to retailing.

The house of Tom's son Johnstone See Poy (See Poy House) at 134 Edith Street, Innisfail (built 1929 to 1932) was added to the Queensland Heritage Register on 19 November 2010 because of its association with this family.

Tom See Poy's memoir My Life and Work, first published in 1925 as a private edition, was reviewed in academic journal The Australian Quarterly in 1931, and is now recognised as a historically significant work as the only published memoir of a 19th-century Chinese-Australian gold miner. An extract of My Life and Work was included in the Macquarie PEN Anthology of Australian Literature published in 2010.
