= See Poy House =

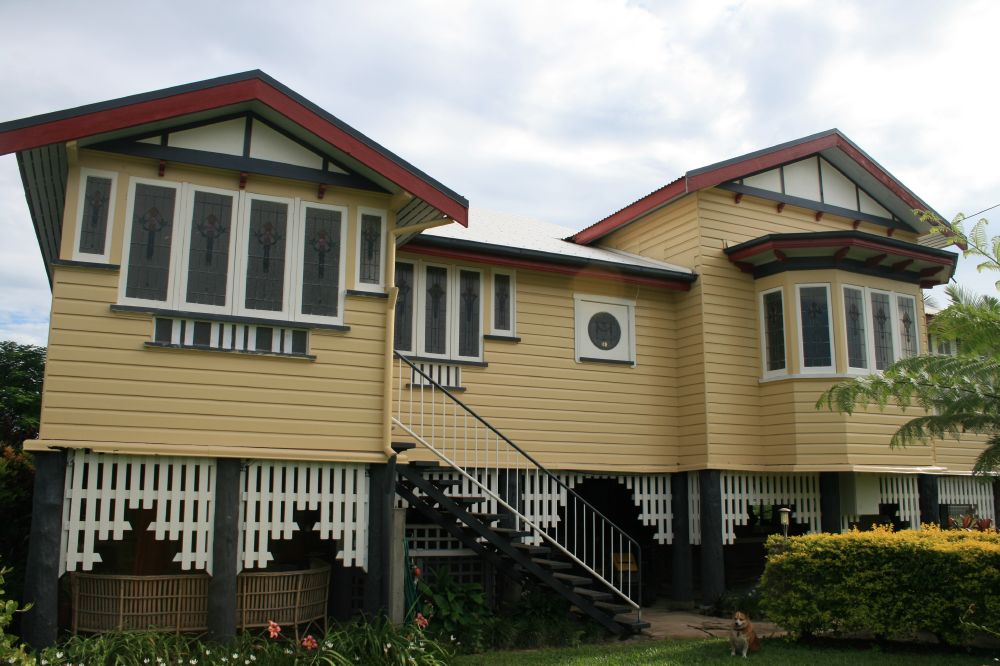
- See Poy House, 2008

- Location within Queensland Location within Australia
- 17.5246°S 146.0264°E
- Location: 134 Edith Street, Innisfail, Cassowary Coast Region, Queensland, Australia

History
- Design period: 1919–1930s (interwar period)
- Built: 1929–1932

Queensland Heritage Register
- Official name: See Poy House
- Type: state heritage (built)
- Designated: 19 November 2010
- Reference no.: 602759
- Significant period: interwar period

See Poy House is a heritage-listed house at 134 Edith Street, Innisfail, Cassowary Coast Region, Queensland, Australia. It was built between 1929 and 1932. It was added to the Queensland Heritage Register on 19 November 2010.

== History ==
See Poy House, located on one of the main streets of Innisfail, is a substantial, high-set timber home constructed between 1929 and 1932 for Johnstone and Theodora (Dora) See Poy, second generation Chinese Australians from the prominent Innisfail-based See Poy family. The intactness of the house and its garden setting, and the association with the family's social and commercial history, are evidence of Chinese migrant prosperity and success in early twentieth century regional Queensland.

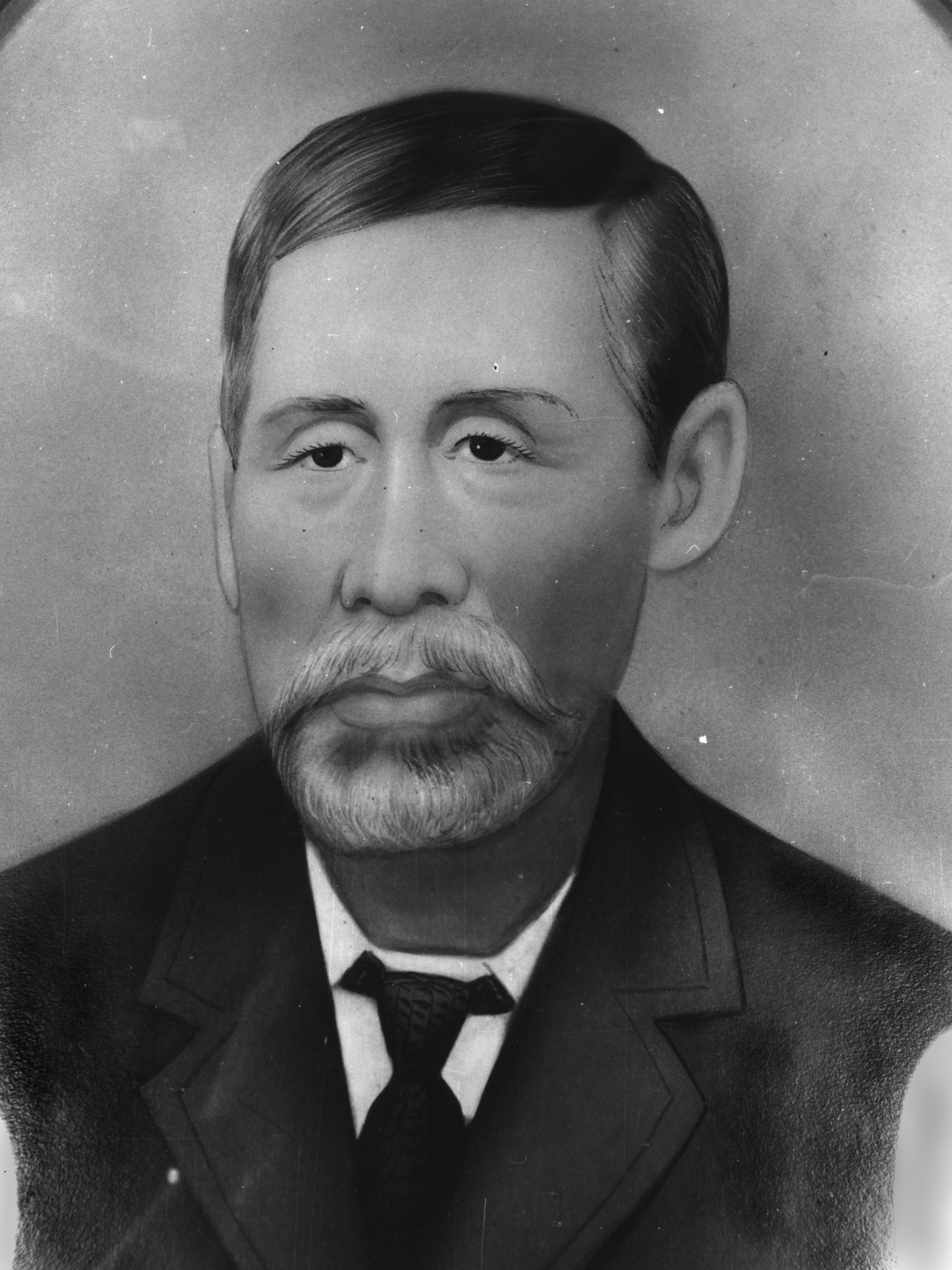
Portrait of Taam Sze Pui (Tom See Poy), Chinese Australian merchant

With the discovery of gold on the Palmer River in 1872, Chinese men, including Taam Sze Pui (Tom See Poy, an anglicisation of his name that he came to adopt), migrated to work on the Palmer goldfields, but many also established market gardens and set up businesses catering for new arrivals. Chinese migrants moved between settlements and lived throughout the north on the Hodgkinson goldfields, on the Atheron Tableland working in the timber industry and in the small settlements of Smithfield and Cairns in 1876. In 1880 the Johnstone River district was identified as suitable for agriculture and opened up for settlement and sugar production. Workers came from around the north, including Tom See Poy and other Chinese men. By 1886, the Chinese community at Geraldton (later Innisfail) had grown rapidly, almost matching the Chinese population at Cairns (the largest outside Brisbane). They worked in the sugar and banana industry, the latter rivalling sugar as the region's primary economic activity. Many Chinese men were involved in the banana industry, including Tom See Poy and Tam Sie whose early success with bananas saw them become leading businessmen investing in property and farming.

In July 1883 Tom See Poy and two other Chinese men set up the Kam Who store at Mourilyan and then moved to Innisfail. A few years later, Tom bought out the others and was still operating the Innisfail store when it was damaged in the 1918 Innisfail cyclone. Although Tom See Poy's initial business activities were modest, See Poy & Sons grew rapidly under the management of his children by the 1920s. Tom See Poy retired in 1925 and died the following year leaving an estate of £32,576. All but the youngest of his five children played a role in the store during their adult life. Eldest son Johnstone became the company director but his two sisters also had a significant role in the business as well.

See Poy and Sons became the largest department store in North Queensland, with international connections. It catered for a wide clientele in Innisfail and beyond, selling everything from toys and shoes to groceries, furniture and cars. Under the directorship of Johnstone See Poy the business extended its floor area and increased its range of merchandise, and in 1929, purchased a car dealership. The following year the firm embarked upon a significant upgrade of its existing timber store and built Innisfail's biggest department store. The new two storey building was constructed of reinforced concrete - a popular modern material being increasingly used at the time because of its ability to withstand cyclones and floods. The new store was the equal of similar establishments in other parts of Queensland, and also of the Chinese Australian owned and operated emporia that dominated the skylines of Hong Kong, Guangzhou and Shanghai between 1907 and 1931. (The emporia owned by the Chinese Australian Guo and Ma families are two examples of those operating in Hong Kong and China.) At its peak See Poy & Sons was one of the foremost department stores in north Queensland. The firm enjoyed significant customer loyalty and successfully withstood mercantile competition from the mail order service of McWhirters in Brisbane, from Penney's variety store, from other Innisfail stores, and from department stores situated in the large cities throughout north Queensland. It continued to operate until the early 1980s, the whole See Poy family being honoured by the Queensland Government in 1981 with a commemorative plaque for its contribution to retailing.

During the period between World War I and World War II, which was one of business expansion for See Poy & Sons, members of the See Poy family also built private residences in close proximity to their department store which was located one block east of 134 Edith Street on the north-eastern corner of the intersection of Edith and Ernest Streets. Dora See Poy's family, the See Hoe's, lived on the western side of See Poy House. In addition, two adjoining houses were built for See Poy daughters on the opposite side of Edith Street from See Poy House. See Poy House is the only residence in this former enclave of family residences that survives intact. The adjacent See Hoe house and one of the daughter's houses has been demolished while the other daughter's house has been significantly altered. See Poy House is clear evidence of the firm's success and, with the demolition of the department store, it is now the last remaining intact structure that reflects the success of this major mercantile enterprise and its Chinese Australian directors.

See Poy House was constructed sometime between 1929 and 1932, with Johnstone Tom See Poy being registered as owner of the land on 15 July 1929. It originally stood on at least 0.4 hectares (0.99 acres) of land between Glady and Charles Streets. There were no fences separating numbers 132, 134 (Johnstone See Poy's residence) and 136 (where Dora's family, the See Hoe's, resided) on Edith Street.

The street elevation of See Poy House was typical of an interwar Queenslander house; however its materials and special features reflect the wealth and standing of the family. It was noticeably larger than a standard house at 670 square metres (7,200 sq ft) in area and featured specially selected timbers (black bean, white hickory and silky oak), brass fittings and leadlight windows. During construction, rough sawn hardwood timber was transported from Maryborough and dressed on site. The use of mortised joints and anchor bolts cyclone-proofed the house. Leadlight windows and 12-foot (3.7 m) high ceilings were notable features of the interior of the house. It comprised a typical room format for a large interwar house being formal dining and lounge rooms, main bedroom, bathroom, second bedroom, study and kitchen. Verandahs were located on both sides and at the rear of the house. Balustrades were solid, other than decorative timber batten panels centred beneath timber bracket arches with side openings. The battening pattern used was consistent throughout: below arched openings and on the front stair balustrade in the infill latticework. The house cost between £1,200 and £2,000.

The house was the venue for family and formal events. The formal dining room with its rectangular table was generally reserved for entertaining guests such as service personnel during World War II. For family meals, the See Poy and See Hoe families usually ate on the rear verandah.

The symmetrical formal garden with concrete edged garden beds was created by Johnstone See Poy who was an enthusiastic gardener, and was also the setting for many family and community activities that gave it a profile in the community. Most of the See Poy residences on Edith Street became venues for community functions and social events, which reflected the family's standing within the community and their inclusive and multicultural approach to staffing See Poy & Sons. Their success and high social profile enabled them to play a leadership role within the Innisfail community and traverse racial boundaries. With Johnstone at the helm of See Poy & Sons, the firm participated in local sporting activities and events. This sustained sporting interest serves as yet another illustration of the family's involvement with mainstream Queensland community life. The firm sponsored its own cricket and tennis teams to compete against staff teams from other firms in the north. Although the firm did not field a football team, it donated a trophy, known as the See Poy Cup, for senior rugby league matches. Keeping pace with many businessmen, Johnstone and his brother-in-law, William Sue Yek, became members of the local golf club.

Johnstone See Poy was a member of the Rotary Club and his wife Dora was admitted to the Inner Wheel (a subdivision for the wives of Rotary members) according to information from an interview with descendant, Herbert Sue Yek. Consequently, their home became a venue for gatherings of the members of the latter group. In 1931, Johnstone and Dora's only child died accidentally. Although they did not become parents again, they made a commitment to host the Baby Show for the local Anglican Church according to another descendant Tiger See Hoe. For many years, 134 Edith Street was the venue for this annual event. Innisfail's children gave performances within the grounds of the house entertaining a large assembled audience and presumably mothers exhibited their babies. This was a major community and charity event providing members of the Innisfail community with a further means of relating to the See Poy family.

The matriarchs of the Sue Yek and Quong Chong families were See Poy daughters and their homes stood directly opposite 134 Edith Street, forming what could be described as a See Poy enclave of beautiful houses. From the 1930s onwards, the homes of the Sue Yek and Quong Chong families were frequent scenes of hospitality and conviviality for the wider community. The Sue Yek family, for instance, played host to the staff, family and friends of the See Poy Staff Club. The Quong Chong family provided musical entertainment for the Chinese Consul-General during a formal visit to north Queensland, whilst the See Poy men held formal discussions with the Chinese delegation. The community activities of the See Poy family continued for several decades. Johnstone's brother, Herbert See Poy's dedication to advancing the cause of the Warrina Home for the Aged was recognised with an MBE in 1980.

The See Poy family made some alterations to the house over time, such as lowering some ceilings and enclosing some verandahs with windows. Dora See Poy carried out minor alterations to the living room, including the removal of a section of decorative arch.

Following Johnstone's death, ownership of the house in Edith Street transferred to Dora in September 1984, and following her death the same year it passed out of the ownership of the See Poy family.

The demolition of the See Poy & Sons department store and the alteration and demolition of the other family houses leaves See Poy House as the last remaining intact structure that reflects the success of this major mercantile enterprise and its Chinese Australian directors.

== Description ==
See Poy House is located on the western outskirts of Innisfail's central business district on a large level block on the southern side of Edith Street, the main thoroughfare through Innisfail and part of the Bruce Highway. It is a substantial, high-set timber dwelling with multiple gables set in a garden with concrete-edged beds and lawn. The orientation of the house to match that of Edith Street places it at a slight angle to the side allotment boundaries and means its south-western corner stands on or near to the western side boundary.

See Poy House is clad in chamferboards and supported on timber stumps with timber lattice panels fixed between those on the perimeter. Its gabled and hipped roof, which accentuates its asymmetrical room layout, is clad in corrugated metal sheeting with eaves lined with timber battens. The gable ends feature flat sheet panels, timber brackets and timber batten trim.

On the northern (Edith Street) elevation, the entrance at the eastern end is emphasised with a small gable projecting from the corner of the L-shaped verandah. A recent timber and steel stair provides access to the entrance doors in the verandah's western wall, which comprise one and a half leaves with leadlight glass in the upper panels. (These stairs are not considered of cultural heritage significance.) The verandah openings above balustrade height have been filled with banks of leadlight casements, some six-light casements and fixed glazing. There is a centre-pivoting porthole window to the entrance hall and a bay window below the central gable. All leadlight in this elevation is of a matching design.

The western elevation largely comprises a verandah enclosed following a similar glazing scheme to that on the front elevation incorporating some louvre banks. The hipped roof has a louvred gablet at its apex, a scheme mirrored on the eastern elevation. The eastern elevation has a similar fenestration pattern determined by the enclosure of the verandah.

A transverse gable roof at the rear of the house extends across the southern elevation, with six-light casements under each gable end facing the east and west. Beneath a wide awning supported on timber battened brackets and attached to the southern wall is a five-light casement, louvres, a semi-enclosed stair with solid balustrade and the stove recess.

The house, the footprint of which is roughly square, has an asymmetrical layout. It contains a core of rooms comprising entry hall, lounge and dining rooms opening onto the now enclosed north- eastern verandah with the large main bedroom and a smaller second bedroom separated by a bathroom opening onto the enclosed western verandah or sleepout. A short hall separates the main living and dining room from the bedrooms. At the rear of the house, a kitchen occupies the south-east corner and is separated from the study in the south-west corner by the enclosed southern verandah that now serves as a long informal living area.

Throughout the house, walls and ceilings, including the raked verandah ceilings, are generally lined with painted v-jointed tongue and groove timber boards and clear finished skirtings and architraves, except in the formal living and dining rooms and the rear informal lounge where there is flat sheeting. The timber floors throughout have been clear finished. In wet areas vinyl tiles have been laid. The joinery of the core rooms is generally clear finished with early brass hardware, while the verandah joinery is painted.

In the formal living and dining rooms decorative features include picture rails, metal and glass pendant light fittings and an early chair and silk floor rug. A pair of early sliding leadlight doors separates these rooms. The leadlight pattern described above is carried through in the French doors opening into the eastern enclosed verandah; however leadlight casements opening from the dining room into this space and the rear informal living area are of a different design. The servery door from the kitchen is split horizontally into two sections: the top slides up into a wall cavity while the bottom swings open on a hinge. The top leaf of the door has a leadlight panel with a similar pattern to the other dining room windows.

The central hall opens off the living room and runs to the informal living room at the rear of the house providing access to the main and second bedrooms, the bathroom and the dining room along the way. The hall has a 3.5-metre (11 ft) high ceiling and various high-waisted three-panel doors, with timber fretwork fanlights above, open off it. A clear finished cupboard in the hall contains the original silky oak telephone stand.

The main bedroom has an early pendant light fitting and two early brass wall lights in the north-east corner. The bay window contains the original bench window seat and brass window hardware. The second bedroom mirrors this decoration scheme. The enclosed western verandah serves as a third bedroom. Eight-light French doors open onto this space from the main and second bedrooms.

The bathroom retains many original finishes including: green faux- marble panelling to the walls with black faux-marble jointing and skirting strips, and rubber tile flooring. Above the height of 2.4-metre (7 ft 10 in) painted timber boards line the walls and ceiling. The bathtub and washbasin are early fixtures, as are the towel rails. There appears to be a hidden cupboard between the bathroom and hallway.

The kitchen also retains many original features including: a sink with legs, sideboard, the serving hatch and stove recess, and the linoleum floor covering with its cardboard backing. Metal bracing for a hot water service is mounted high on a wall. Similar panelling to that used in the bathroom lines the stove recess and the splashback between the sink-top and window sill.

Flat sheeting lines the walls of the enclosed rear verandah to a height of about 2.5 metres (8 ft 2 in) above floor level. Above, the timber framing is exposed to the northern side while timber boarding lines the southern wall. Beyond this lounge is a narrow verandah with a skillion roof that incorporates a toilet, the rear stairs, and the kitchen pantry and stove recess.

A slab has been laid throughout the under-croft of the house which is used for storage. Round timber stumps support the house.

The front boundary is delineated by the original fence which has a rendered masonry base and posts with square caps. Attached to the posts are frames made from tubular steel that are filled with chainmesh.

The yard comprises various garden beds with concrete edging set within areas of lawn. These beds wrap around the front and both sides of the house and line the front fence, parallel to it. They are generally rectangular, one metre wide and four to six metres long. A curving concrete path leads from the gate on Edith Street to the landing of the front stairs, dividing the front yard roughly in half with the garden beds arranged symmetrically either side. Midway between the front fence and the house are two circular beds, two metres in diameter, either side of the path. In line with the rectangular beds set off from the western elevation is a circular one at the rear. Similar beds break up the area of lawn on the eastern side of the house. There is also a narrow rectangular bed located at the rear of the lot about 15 metres (49 ft) behind the south-east corner of the house. A recent swimming pool and entertaining area have been constructed at the rear of the house and are not considered to be of cultural heritage significance.

The original garage of the south-eastern corner of the house is timber-framed and has a gabled roof. Both its roof and walls are clad in corrugated sheet steel.

== Heritage listing ==
See Poy House was listed on the Queensland Heritage Register on 19 November 2010 having satisfied the following criteria.

The place is important in demonstrating the evolution or pattern of Queensland's history.

See Poy House (1932), the home of Johnstone See Poy, who for more than 50 years was the general manager of Queensland's only Chinese Australian owned and operated large department store, See Poy & Sons, is important in demonstrating an aspect of the pattern of Queensland's Chinese migration history. It illustrates the way in which early Chinese migrants achieved monetary success, social standing and integration with the wider community, and contributes significantly to the understanding of a prominent Chinese Australian business family's way of life in regional Queensland.

The place has a special association with the life or work of a particular person, group or organisation of importance in Queensland's history.

See Poy House has a special association with the See Poy family, particularly Johnstone See Poy, general manager of the firm See Poy & Sons, and his wife Theodora. The See Poys were an important Chinese Australian family in north Queensland history, operating See Poy & Sons, a major department store, for approximately 100 years following its establishment by Taam Sze Pui (Tom See Poy). They were important members of the north Queensland community, involved in many social, sporting and philanthropic activities, many of which Johnstone and his wife hosted in this house during the more than 50 years they resided there.

See Poy House - a symbol of the family's success and its desire to participate in the Innisfail community - is the last remaining link to the prominent role these Chinese Australians played in the social and economic development of north Queensland.
