= Canecutters Memorial =

Heritage-listed memorial at Innisfail,, Queensland, Australia

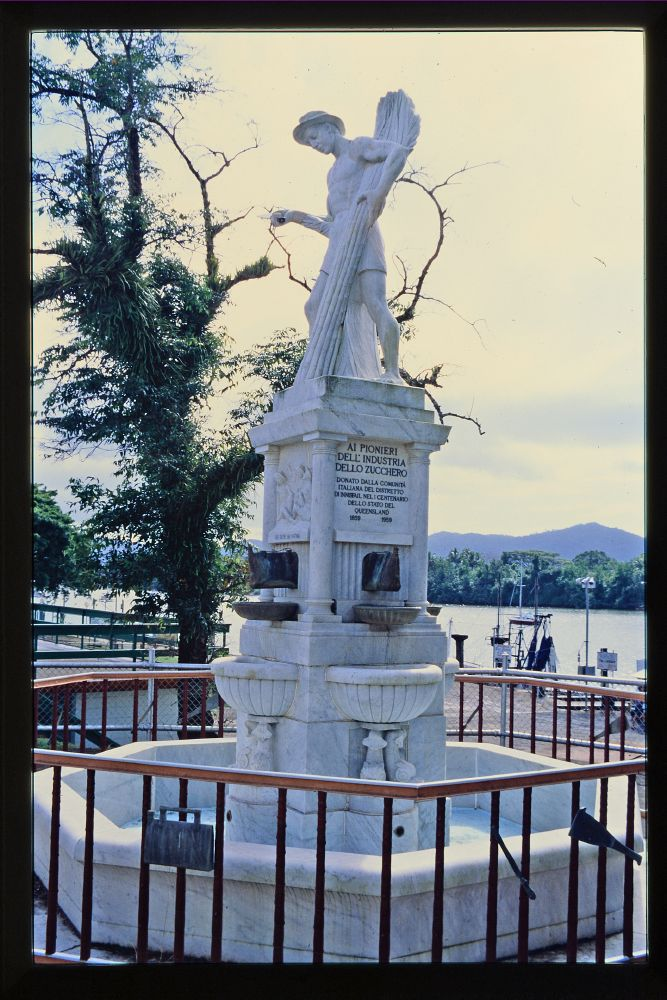
- Canecutters Memorial, 1999

- Location within Queensland Location within Australia
- 17.5238°S 146.0326°E
- Location: Fitzgerald Esplanade, Innisfail, Cassowary Coast Region, Queensland, Australia

History
- Design period: 1940s–1960s (post-World War II)
- Built: 1959

Site notes
- Architect: Renato Beretta

Queensland Heritage Register
- Official name: Canecutters Memorial, Pioneers of the Sugar Industry Monument
- Type: state heritage (built)
- Designated: 29 April 2003
- Reference no.: 602041
- Significant period: 1950s (fabric)
- Significant components: statue, fence/wall – perimeter, memorial – fountain

Canecutters Memorial is a heritage-listed memorial at Fitzgerald Esplanade, Innisfail, Cassowary Coast Region, Queensland, Australia. It was designed by Renato Beretta and built in 1959. It is also known as Pioneers of the Sugar Industry Monument. It was added to the Queensland Heritage Register on 29 April 2003.

== History ==
The Canecutter's Memorial was erected in 1959 by the Italian community of the Innisfail district to commemorate the centenary of the state of Queensland. The life-size statue of a canecutter was chosen, reflecting the importance of the sugarcane industry in the development of the district's economy.

The town of Innisfail (called Geraldton until 1911) was founded in 1880 by Thomas Henry Fitzgerald. Fitzgerald arrived on the banks of the Johnstone River with 35 South Sea Islanders and ten Irish workers to grow sugarcane on a 10,000 hectares (25,000 acres) land grant, funded by the Roman Catholic Bishop of Brisbane and All Hallows' Sisters of Mercy. Others arrived soon after, and a community was established with an economy based firmly on the production of sugar. In 1882 a sugar mill was built at Mourilyan in 1882, followed by the establishment of the South Johnstone mill in 1915.

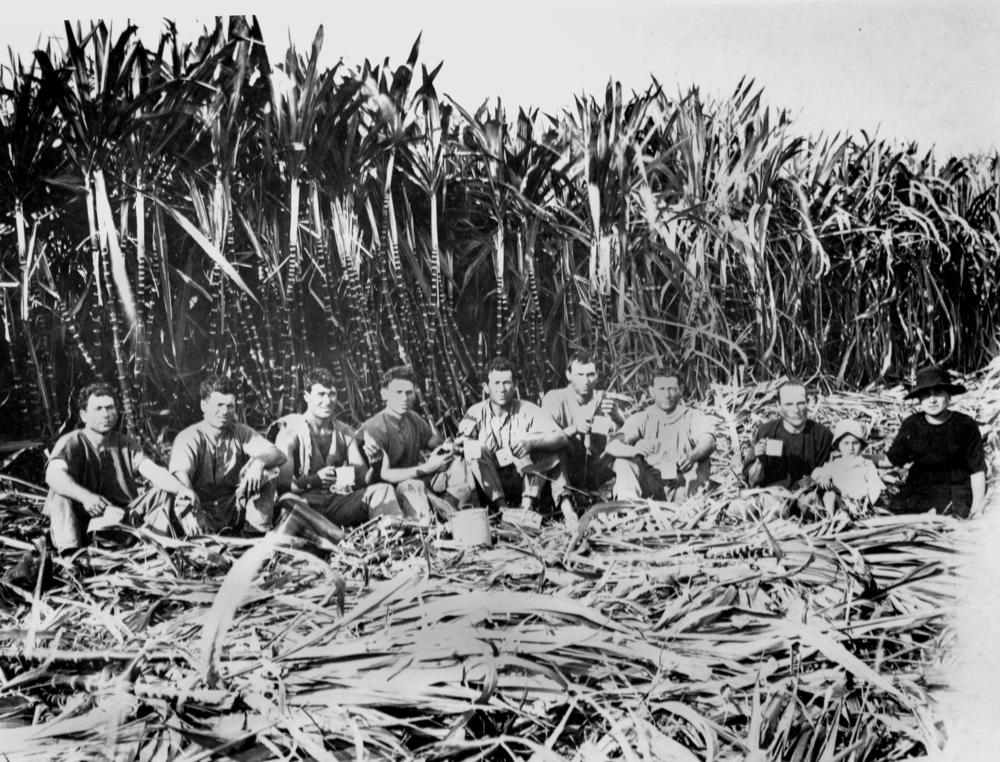
Italian sugar cane cutters, Innisfail District, 1923

Sugarcane was first grown commercially in Queensland in 1864 at Louis Hope's estate at Ormiston. The crop was originally grown on large plantations, using South Sea Islander labour as it was considered working in cane fields in the climatic conditions of Queensland was too prejudicial to the health of Europeans. This practice began to change in the 1880s and 1890s however when the Queensland Government adopted a policy of gradual repatriation of South Sea Islanders. Queensland sugarcane growers considered workers from the warmer parts of Europe, including Italy, to be appropriate replacement labourers. The first Italians to arrive in North Queensland landed in Townsville in 1891. A small number moved into the Johnstone area during the 1890s, although they came as tenant farmers and not labourers. The first large group of Italian nationals seeking cane cutting contracts arrived c. 1907-08. These Italian migrants were known for their determination to accept hardship and poor working conditions which, together with great economic cooperation, saw many Italian labourers gaining their own holdings.

While many Italians arrived in North Queensland before the First World War, Italian immigration peaked in the years following the war. At this time conditions in Italy were such that many looked abroad to start a new life. Australia became a favoured destination in the 1920s when the United States moved to restrict immigration from Italy. The Australian and Italian Governments agreed on a chain migration system, where Italians already resident in Australia nominated relatives and fellow villagers, leading to the development of a chain immigration system. As a result of this system, family group pocket settlements mushroomed. The strong Italian community established in the Innisfail district before the war was strengthened further by the post-war immigration.

The number of Italian migrants arriving in North Queensland peaked again in the years following World War II. Immigrants from many European countries, including Yugoslavia (especially Croatia and Slovenia), Malta, Spain and Italy arrived in Australia as displaced persons, and were indentured to work in the cane fields. Of the displaced migrants, the Italians were the largest ethnic group to be employed in the sugar industry, continuing to make a significant contribution to the sugar growing communities of North Queensland, including Innisfail.

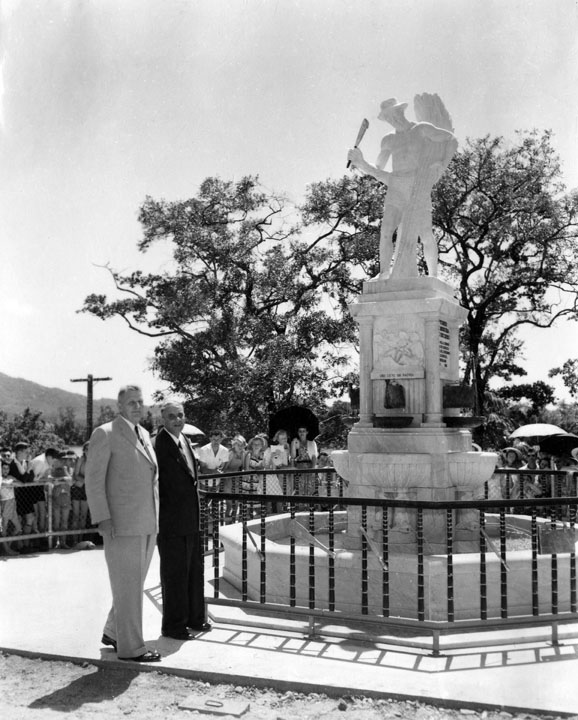
Premier Nicklin unveiling the memorial, 4 October 1959

In 1959 the Queensland Government suggested communities commemorate the centenary of separation from New South Wales by a structure of a permanent nature. A group from the Italian community in Innisfail decided to erect a statue. Photographs taken throughout the history of the sugar industry in the Johnstone area were submitted to Sydney artist Lamberto Yonna who suggested a statue in the form of a canecutter. The committee formed to oversee construction wrote to the Chamber of Commerce of Carrara, Italy, requesting the submission of designs by suitable sculptors. The design of Renato Beretta, the Instructor at the Carrara Academy of Arts, was selected. The monument was made in Carrara, arriving in 32 cases to be erected by an Italian migrant P Bertolani who had arrived in Australia two months previously. The monument was officially unveiled by the Premier of Queensland, the Hon Frank Nicklin, on 4 October 1959. It cost £5000 to construct.

== Description ==
The Canecutter's Memorial is located on the Innisfail Esplanade overlooking the Johnstone River at the eastern end of Edith Street. It is sited on a small sealed area set among trees and a grassed park- like area. The land to the east of the memorial slopes steeply towards the river.

The white marble monument consists of an octagonal pool from which rises a square section plinth containing a water fountain and bowl on each face and topped by a life-sized statue of a man cutting cane by hand. The cane cutter wears the typical clothing of shorts and hat and wields the trademark cane knife in his right hand. Under his left arm and across his back sweeps a sheaf of standing sugar cane.

Below the statue, two opposing faces of the plinth feature bas reliefs depicting cane cutters at work. That at the front of the monument carries the Latin motto "UBI BENI IBI PATRIA", which loosely interprets to 'Where one is content, there is one's homeland'. On the other two faces are inscriptions, one in English and one in Italian. The English version reads:

TO THE PIONEERS OF THE SUGAR INDUSTRY DONATED BY THE ITALIAN COMMUNITY OF INNISFAIL DISTRICT ON THE FIRST CENTENARY OF THE STATE OF QUEENSLAND 1859 1959

Below these panels are cast metal water spouts in the form of water bags over metal bowls. The water then flows into fluted marble basins supported by pairs of conventional dolphins. The whole is surrounded by an octagonal metal railing made in the form of stylised cane stalks topped by tram rails and decorated with implements associated with the trade.

== Heritage listing ==
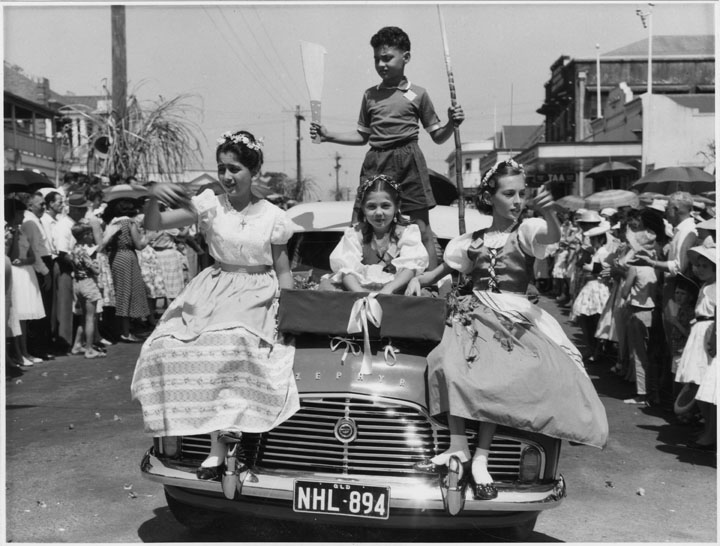
Parade for the unveiling of the memorial, 4 October 1959

Canecutters Memorial was listed on the Queensland Heritage Register on 29 April 2003 having satisfied the following criteria.

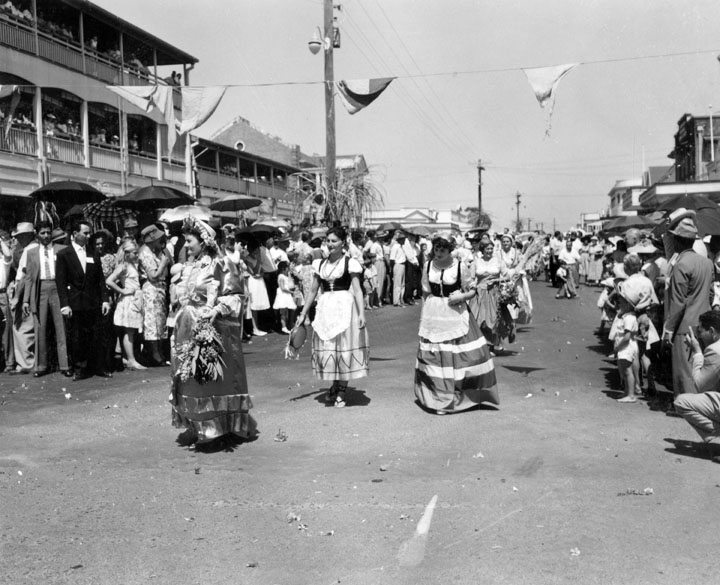
Parade for the unveiling, 4 October 1959

The place is important in demonstrating the evolution or pattern of Queensland's history.

The Canecutter's Memorial is important in demonstrating the evolution of Queensland's history as an illustration of the significance of the sugar industry in North Queensland. For many years, the growth of Innisfail and the surrounding district was reliant on the sugar industry, an industry which continues to the present day to be a crop of importance in the economy of the Johnstone Shire. Erected by the Italian community of Innisfail, the Memorial is important in demonstrating the contribution of Italian migrants to the sugar industry, both as labourers and farm owners. The subject of the Memorial, a canecutter, further demonstrates the evolution of Queensland's history as a figure in the sugar industry made obsolete by the mechanisation of cane harvesting in the 1960s and 1970s.

The place demonstrates rare, uncommon or endangered aspects of Queensland's cultural heritage.

The Canecutter's Memorial demonstrates a rare aspect of Queensland's cultural heritage as an early example of a monument carrying an inscription in two languages, English and Italian. Constructed in 1959, it is a multicultural tribute to the pioneers of the sugar industry, which predates the nationwide move towards multiculturalism later in the twentieth century.

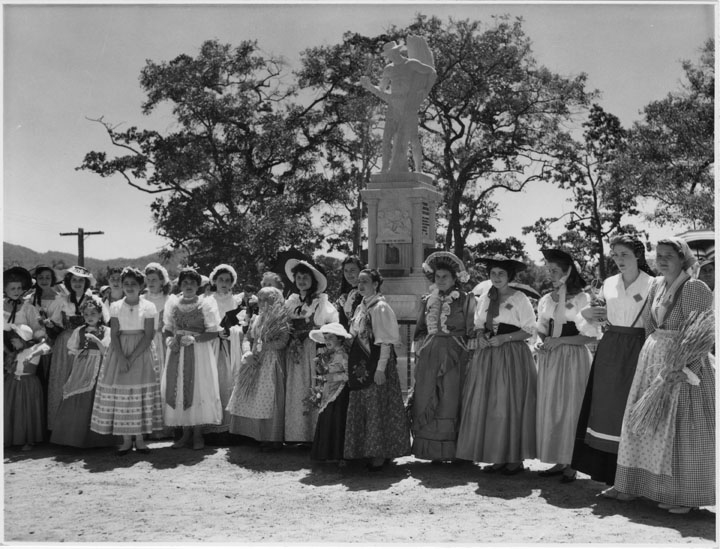
Women in traditional costume at the memorial, 4 October 1959

The place is important because of its aesthetic significance.

The Canecutter's Memorial is important because of its aesthetic significance as a skilled example of the sculptor's art, occupying a prominent position along the Innisfail Esplanade, an open park-like area situated along the Johnstone River, and terminating long views east along Edith Street, one of the major streets of the central business district of the town.

The place has a strong or special association with a particular community or cultural group for social, cultural or spiritual reasons.

The Canecutter's Memorial has a special association with the Italian community of Innisfail, whose members erected the memorial in 1959 to the pioneers of the sugar industry, many of whom were Italian. The Memorial also has a special association with the wider community of Innisfail as a tribute to the pioneers of an industry that has been of vital importance to the development and prosperity of the district.
