= Innisfail Advocate =

- Type: Newspaper
- Format: Broadsheet
- Owner: News Corp Australia
- Founded: 6 December 1906
- Ceased publication: June 2020
- Headquarters: Innisfail, Queensland, Australia

Johnstone River Advocate, front page, Friday 4 January 1929

The Innisfail Advocate was a newspaper published in Innisfail, Queensland, Australia from 1906 to 2020.

== History ==
Patrick James Leahy launched the Johnstone River Advocate on 6 December 1906. On Leahy's death in 1927 the newspaper was purchased by William Henry George Groom.

It was originally published as a weekly newspaper; Groom moved to a bi-weekly schedule in January 1929. From November 1940, the newspaper was published daily and in May 1941 was renamed the Evening Advocate.

In 1973, a massive increase in the cost of telex messages used to circulate syndicated news made the newspaper financially unviable and Groom threatened to close the newspaper in September 1973. (Note: The Townsville Daily Bulletin. 17 September 1973. Pg 2: Innisfail's Daily Paper To Close. Innisfail, Sep. 17 - Innisfail's "Evening Advocate" published every afternoon from Mondays to Fridays inclusive, and Australia's smallest daily newspaper, announced today that it would close operations on Friday, September 28. The reason given for suspension was that publication after that date would become financially impracticable because of provision contained in the Federal Budget statement by Postmaster-General L Bowen that concessions to press, broadcasting and television organisations relating to postal and telecommunications charges would be discontinued as from October 1.) However he was persuaded to continue to publish the newspaper and from October 1973 it was published only three times a week without telexed news content. Groom retired in January 1978, selling the newspaper.

In 2015, the newspaper continued to be published bi-weekly as the Innisfail Advocate by Newscorp.

Along with a number of other regional Australian newspapers owned by NewsCorp, the newspaper ceased publication in June 2020 with Innisfail news content to appear in The Cairns Post. The newspaper closure was attributed to the shift of advertising from newspapers to Google and Facebook.

== Digitisation ==
Historic issues of the newspaper from 1928 to 1954 have been digitised as part of the Australian Newspapers Digitisation Program of the National Library of Australia and are available via Trove.
