= Innisfail, Queensland =

Innisfail
- Town
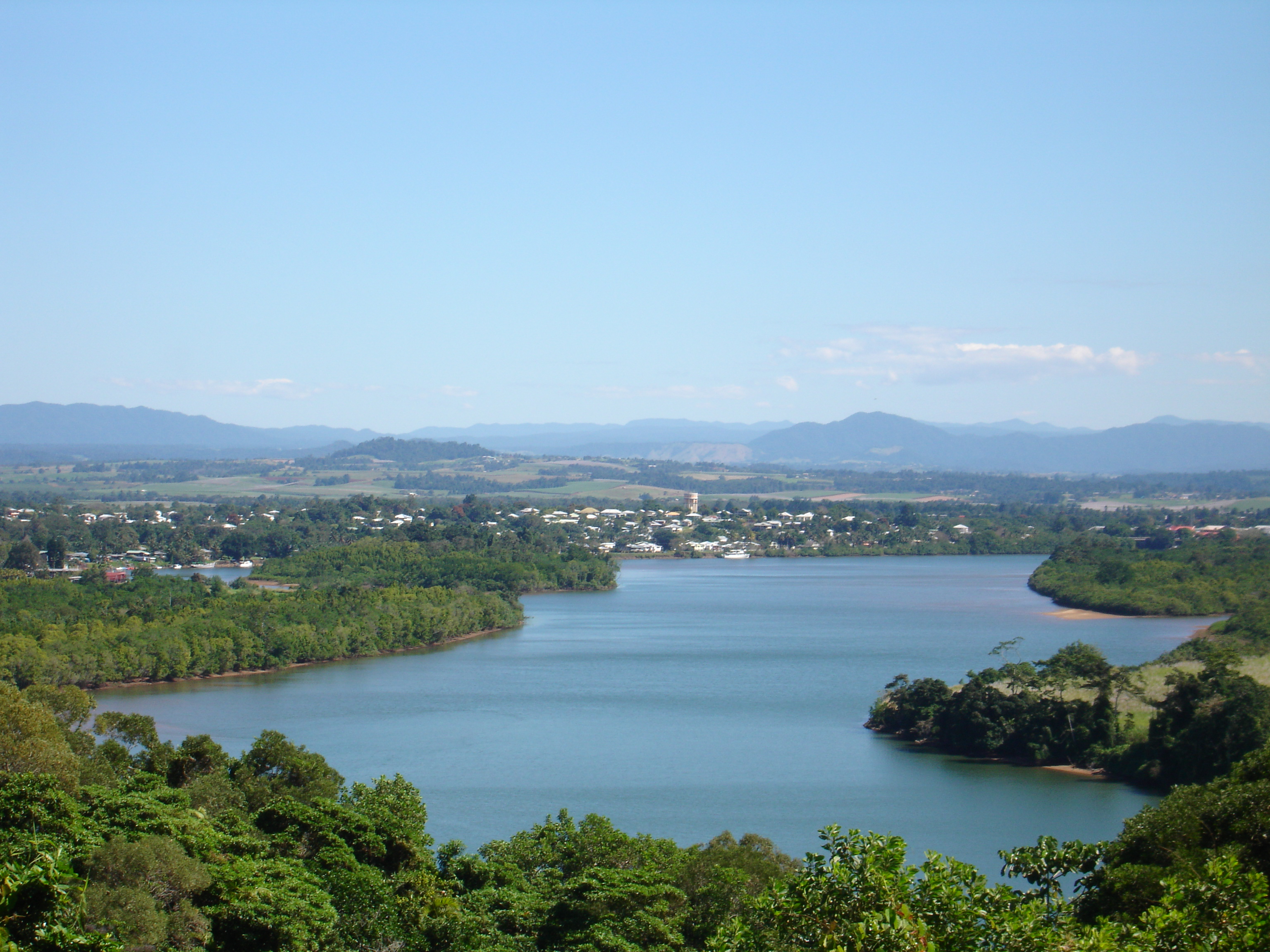
- The township of Innisfail, as seen from Coquette Point

- Interactive map of Innisfail
- Coordinates: 17.5238°S 146.0311°E
- Country: Australia
- State: Queensland
- LGA: Cassowary Coast Region
- Location: 87.7 km (54.5 mi) S of Cairns; 259 km (161 mi) NNW of Townsville; 1,591 km (989 mi) NNW of Brisbane
- Established: 1882/83

Government
  - State electorate: Hill
  - Federal division: Kennedy

Area
  - Total: 10.3 km^{2} (4.0 sq mi)
- Elevation: 10 m (33 ft)

Population
  - Totals: 7,173 (2021 census town); 1,091 (2016 census locality)
  - Density: 696/km^{2} (1,804/sq mi)
- Time zone: UTC+10:00 (AEST)
- Postcode: 4860
- Mean max temp: 28.0 °C (82.4 °F)
- Mean min temp: 19.4 °C (66.9 °F)
- Annual rainfall: 3,552.4 mm (139.86 in)
Localities around Innisfail
Culliane	Culliane	Innisfail Estate
Goondi Hill	Innisfail	Webb
Goondi Hill	Mighell	East Innisfail

Innisfail (from Irish: Inis Fáil) is a regional town and locality in the Cassowary Coast Region, Queensland, Australia. The town was originally called Geraldton until 1910. In the 2021 census, the town of Innisfail had a population of 7,173 people, while the locality of Innisfail (the town's centre) had a population of 1,091 people.

Innisfail is the largest township of the Cassowary Coast Region and is known for its sugar and banana industries, as well as for being one of Australia's wettest towns. In March 2006, Innisfail gained worldwide attention when Tropical Cyclone Larry passed over, causing extensive damage.

== Geography ==
Innisfail's town centre is situated at the junction of the Johnstone River and South Johnstone River, approximately 5 km (3 mi) from the coast. It is located near large tracts of old-growth tropical rainforest surrounded by vast areas of extensive farmlands. Queensland's highest mountain, Mount Bartle Frere, part of Australia's Great Dividing Range, is 15 kilometres (9 mi) to the north.

The town's central business district is in the vicinity of Edith Street and Rankin Street (17.5241°S 146.0311°E).

=== Climate ===
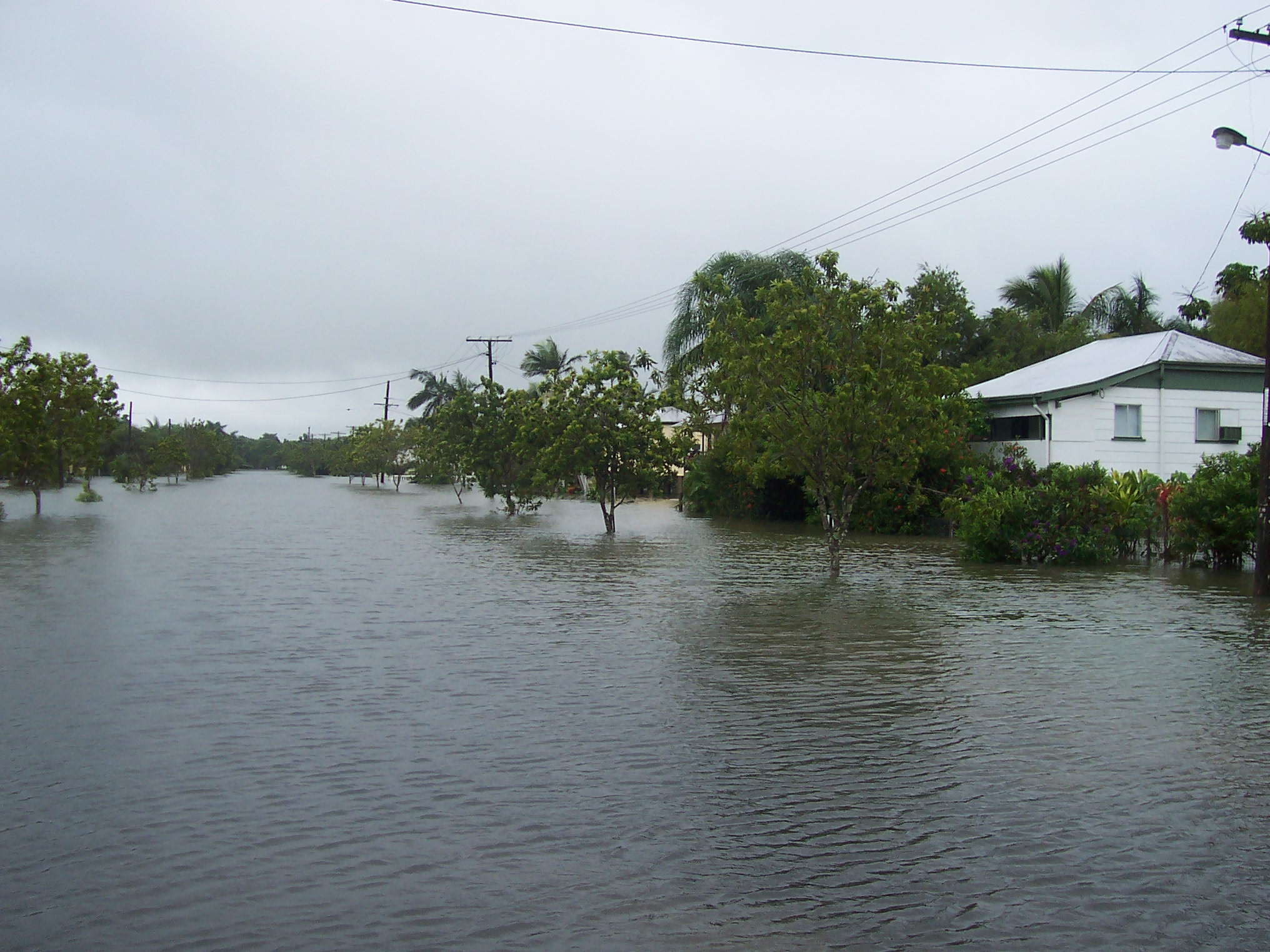
Howe St. in East Innisfail is commonly affected by even minor flooding

Innisfail experiences a tropical rainforest climate (Köppen: Af) and has no month with an average temperature below 18 °C (64.4 °F) or with less than 60 millimetres (2.4 in) of rainfall. However, as a trade-wind climate that experiences frequent cyclones, it is not equatorial. Consistently, humid, very warm to hot weather dominates in Innisfail. In particular Innisfail is reputed as being among the wettest towns in Australia. Babinda, 30 kilometres (19 mi) north of Innisfail is generally considered to be the wettest.

Unlike most of tropical Australia, the southern winter or "dry" season is not completely dry as moist easterly winds bring frequent showers; rainfall is, however, still far lower than during the southern summer. Monthly totals of over 1,000 mm (39 in) are common in the region between January and April and some months will not experience a day without rain if the monsoon is unusually heavy. The town gets around 63.5 clear days per year.

During the summer "cyclone season", Innisfail is frequently under threat from tropical cyclones developing in the Coral Sea. High rainfall associated with these storms, combined with Innisfail's riverside location often causes flooding.

Climate data is taken from Innisfail weather station, which has recorded rainfall since 1881 and temperature since 1908. Meanwhile, sun data was borrowed from the South Johnstone EXP weather station, 9.7 km SW of Innisfail.

Climate data for Innisfail (17º31'12"S, 146º01'48"E, 10 m AMSL) (1881–2020 normals, 1957–2020 extremes and sun 1965–1999)
Month	Jan	Feb	Mar	Apr	May	Jun	Jul	Aug	Sep	Oct	Nov	Dec	Year
Record high °C (°F)	40.1 (104.2)	40.8 (105.4)	37.8 (100.0)	34.2 (93.6)	31.2 (88.2)	29.5 (85.1)	30.0 (86.0)	30.4 (86.7)	32.2 (90.0)	35.6 (96.1)	41.0 (105.8)	40.3 (104.5)	41.0 (105.8)
Mean daily maximum °C (°F)	30.9 (87.6)	30.7 (87.3)	29.8 (85.6)	28.3 (82.9)	26.4 (79.5)	24.6 (76.3)	24.1 (75.4)	25.1 (77.2)	26.7 (80.1)	28.4 (83.1)	29.8 (85.6)	30.8 (87.4)	28.0 (82.3)
Mean daily minimum °C (°F)	22.9 (73.2)	22.9 (73.2)	22.2 (72.0)	20.6 (69.1)	18.4 (65.1)	16.3 (61.3)	15.3 (59.5)	15.5 (59.9)	17.0 (62.6)	19.0 (66.2)	20.9 (69.6)	22.1 (71.8)	19.4 (67.0)
Record low °C (°F)	17.2 (63.0)	18.0 (64.4)	17.2 (63.0)	10.5 (50.9)	9.4 (48.9)	6.5 (43.7)	6.2 (43.2)	8.2 (46.8)	10.1 (50.2)	12.2 (54.0)	16.0 (60.8)	17.2 (63.0)	6.2 (43.2)
Average precipitation mm (inches)	512.3 (20.17)	583.5 (22.97)	663.2 (26.11)	450.8 (17.75)	302.6 (11.91)	188.5 (7.42)	137.5 (5.41)	115.1 (4.53)	85.3 (3.36)	88.9 (3.50)	156.0 (6.14)	263.7 (10.38)	3,549.5 (139.74)
Average precipitation days (≥ 1.0 mm)	14.7	15.3	17.6	16.8	15.0	11.5	10.3	8.5	7.0	6.6	8.3	10.5	142.1
Average afternoon relative humidity (%)	72	74	73	73	72	70	69	66	65	65	67	69	70
Average dew point °C (°F)	23.6 (74.5)	23.9 (75.0)	22.8 (73.0)	21.5 (70.7)	19.5 (67.1)	17.2 (63.0)	16.3 (61.3)	16.8 (62.2)	18.3 (64.9)	20.1 (68.2)	21.7 (71.1)	22.8 (73.0)	20.4 (68.7)
Mean monthly sunshine hours	201.5	155.4	170.5	165.0	142.6	165.0	173.6	198.4	222.0	254.2	240.0	229.4	2,317.6
Percentage possible sunshine	50	43	45	47	41	50	50	55	62	66	62	56	52
Source: Bureau of Meteorology (1881–2020 normals, extremes 1957–2020), (1965–1999 sun, sourced from South Johnstone EXP weather station, 9.7 km away)

== History ==
Prior to European settlement the Innisfail area was occupied by five separate societies of the Mamu people. These Aboriginal people followed migratory lifestyles in the rainforest and traversed rivers in string-bark canoes.

The first arrival of European people came in January 1872 when survivors of the shipwreck, the "Maria" arrived on the coastal areas surrounding what is now the Johnstone River. Sub-Inspector Robert Arthur Johnstone of the Native Police came with the intention of rescuing remaining survivors and collectively punishing Aboriginals thought to have killed a number of the shipwrecked crew. In mid 1873, Johnstone returned to the area as part of another punitive mission and ventured further upriver between what is today Flying Fish Point and Coquette Point. Johnstone wrote very highly of the area, stating:

A most glorious view appeared – a noble reach of fresh water, studded with blacks with their canoes and catamarans, others on the sandy beaches; deep blue fresh water expanding to an imposing breadth.

— Robert Johnstone (1873),

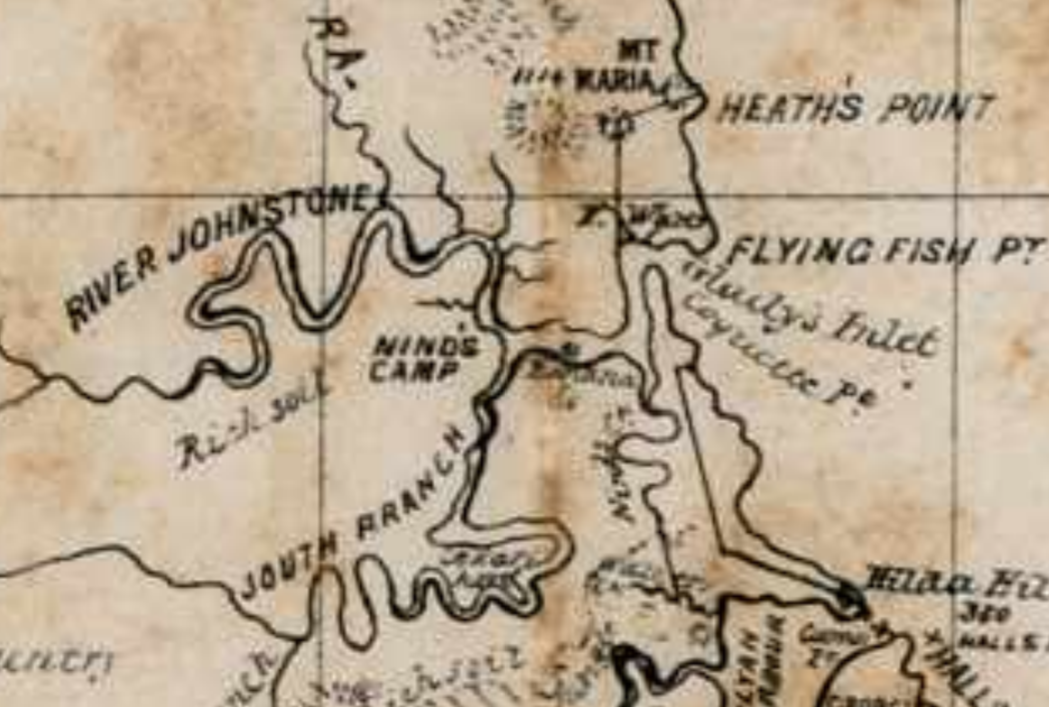
1874 map of the Johnstone River area showing Nind's Camp

In October 1873, Johnstone again returned as part of the Northeast Coast Expedition led by the explorer George Elphinstone Dalrymple. British settlement was first established at the junction of the north and south branches of the Johnstone River by this expedition on 5 October 1873. It was named Nind's Camp after Philip Henry Nind who accompanied the party.

Later in 1879, Irishman Thomas Henry Fitzgerald arrived in the area to establish a sugar industry at his Innisfail Estate (now the locality of that name). He was accompanied by large numbers of Kanaka South Sea Islanders workers accompanied by smaller numbers of Irish labourers. The house built by Fitzgerald and thus the first establishment in the area was called Innisfallen, after the largest island in the Lakes of Killarney, Ireland. Inis Fáil (island of destiny) is an ancient Irish name for Ireland itself. The name is used in the rarely sung third verse of "The Soldier's Song", the Irish national anthem. The stone mentioned may be the stone at Tara, County Meath, at which high kings of Ireland were crowned.

From 1879, the settlement was named Geraldton (officially in July 1883) by Fitzgerald, but on 20 August 1910 it was renamed "Innisfail" to avoid confusion with the town of the same name in Western Australia. It was Margaret-Mary Noone a long time resident of the area who suggested the name Innisfail as a way to honour T.H Fitzgerald's pioneering efforts and Ireland

Johnstone River Post Office opened on 1 November 1882 (a receiving office had been open from 1880), was renamed Geraldton two months later and Innisfail in 1910.

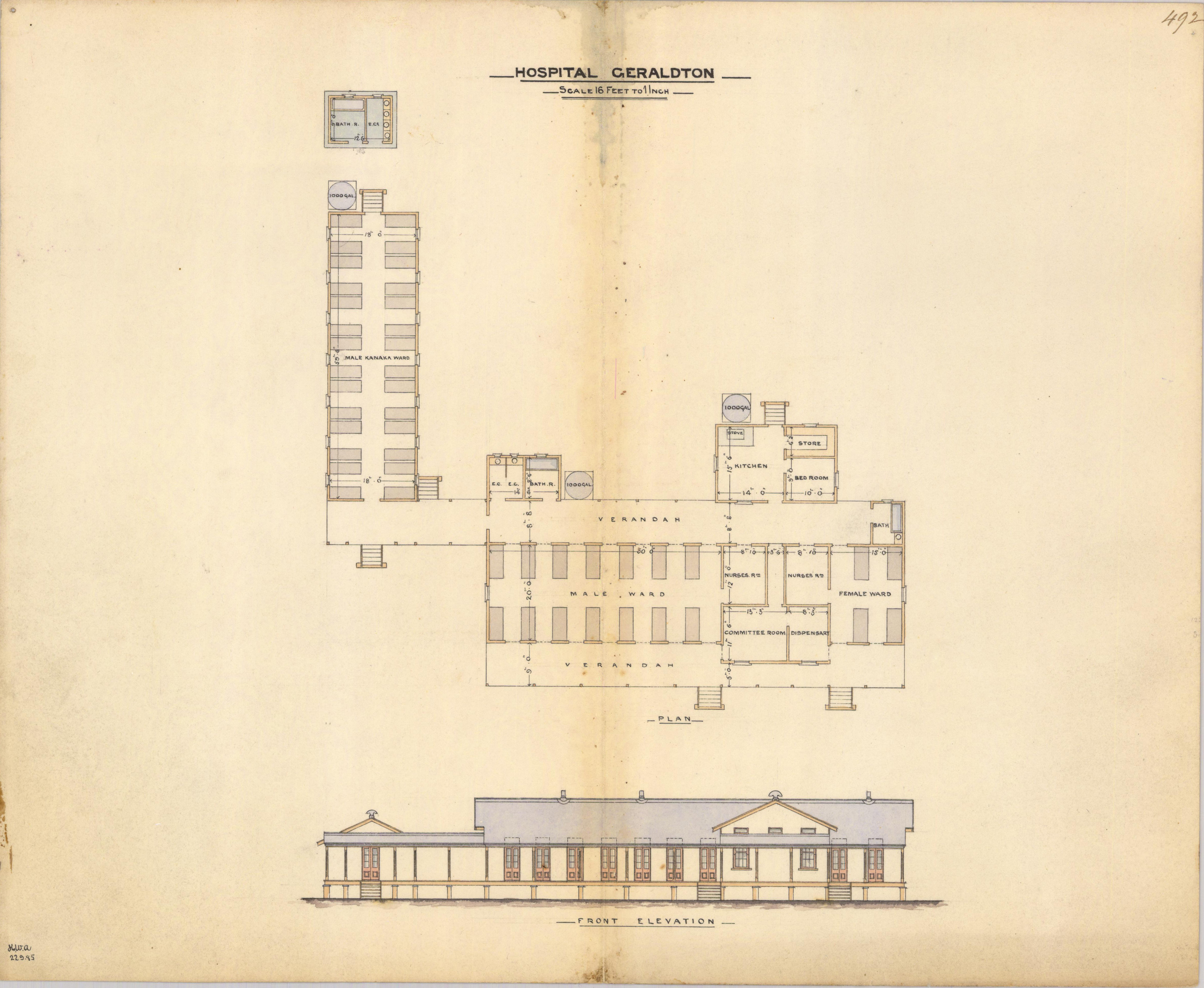
Architectural drawing of the Geraldton Hospital, 1885

The settlers who moved into this region from 1889 were exceptionally diverse. The first influential group were Anglo-Celtic, but they were outnumbered by "Kanaka" South Sea Islanders. Aboriginal and Torres Strait workers, Chinese miners who developed the banana industry and retail businesses. French merchants, and German timber and sugar producers.

In May 1885, the Queensland Government called for tenders to build the Geraldton Hospital to replace the existing tent hospital; however, the tenders submitted were more expensive than the government was willing to pay, so they called again for tenders in September 1885 resulting in a contract with E. Couchman for £1527.

Geraldton Provisional School opened on 18 July 1887 in the present-day Anzac Memorial Park on the corner of the Bruce Highway and Ernest Street (17.5239°S 146.0278°E) with an initial enrolment of 15 boys and 13 girls under head teacher Thomas Edward White. On 1 August 1894, it became Geraldton State School. On 21 January 1908, the school relocated to Emily Street. On 8 April 1913, the name was changed to Innisfail State School to reflect the renaming of the town. The original school site is commemorated with a plaque laid on 4 July 1987.

The Innisfail Parish within the Roman Catholic Vicariate Apostolic of Cooktown (now the Roman Catholic Diocese of Cairns) was established in 1898. It is now merged with the Mourilyian and South Johnstone parishes.

Sacred Heart Catholic School opened on 2 November 1902 with an enrolment of 42 students. It was operated by the Sisters of the Good Samaritan. It was renamed Good Counsel Catholic Primary School in 1975. When the Sisters were no longer able to lead the school, it was briefly led by the Marist Brothers until the first lay principal was appointed in 1982. The Sisters withdrew from teaching in the school in 1990.

In 1906, Patrick Leahy established the Johnstone River Advocate newspaper, with the first issue published in December that year. Later it was renamed the Johnstone River Advocate and Innisfail News, the Evening Advocate, and the Innisfail Chronicle. The newspaper continues to be published as the Innisfail Advocate.

In June 1912 there was a meeting that resulted in the creation of the Johnstone River Agricultural Association with the intention to hold their first agricultural show that same year. The first show was held on Friday 11 and Saturday 12 October 1912 in recreation ground (now Callender Park) with exhibits in the Shire Hall and the Oddfellows Hall. In 1935 the show needed more space and the present showgrounds were established (in present-day Goondi Hill) with purpose-built buildings and a show ring. The show was held annually apart from 1942 and 1942 when, due to World War II, the army was using the showground. In 1986 many of the showgound's buildings were badly damaged by Cyclone Winifred with further damage sustained during Cyclone Larry in 2006. In 2002 the show introduced a banana packing competition which was very popular.

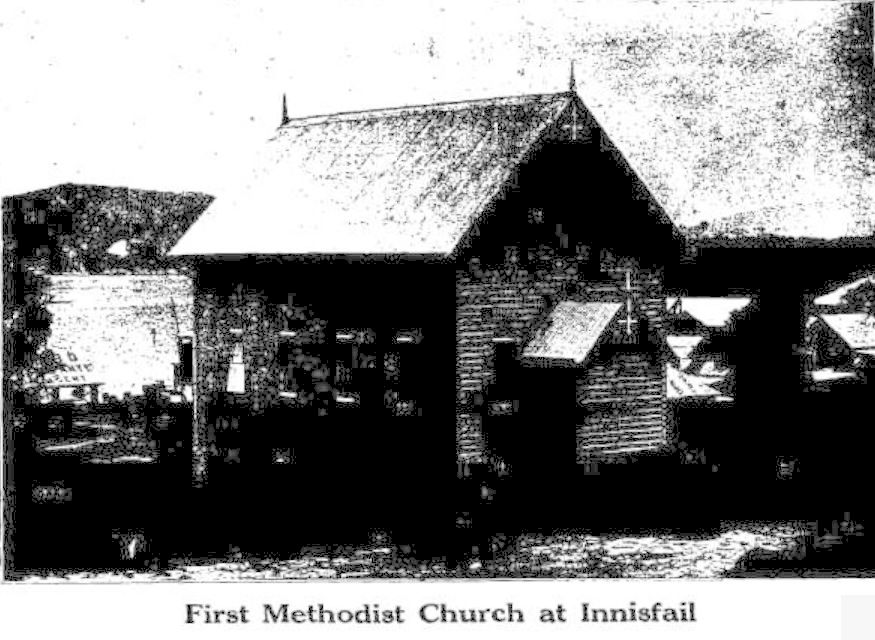
First Methodist Church at Innisfail, 1913

The first Methodist church in Innisfail was completed about October 1913; a Methodist home missionary had been stationed from 1911. The church was at 61 Rankin Street (17.52198°S 146.03042°E), opposite the Catholic church.

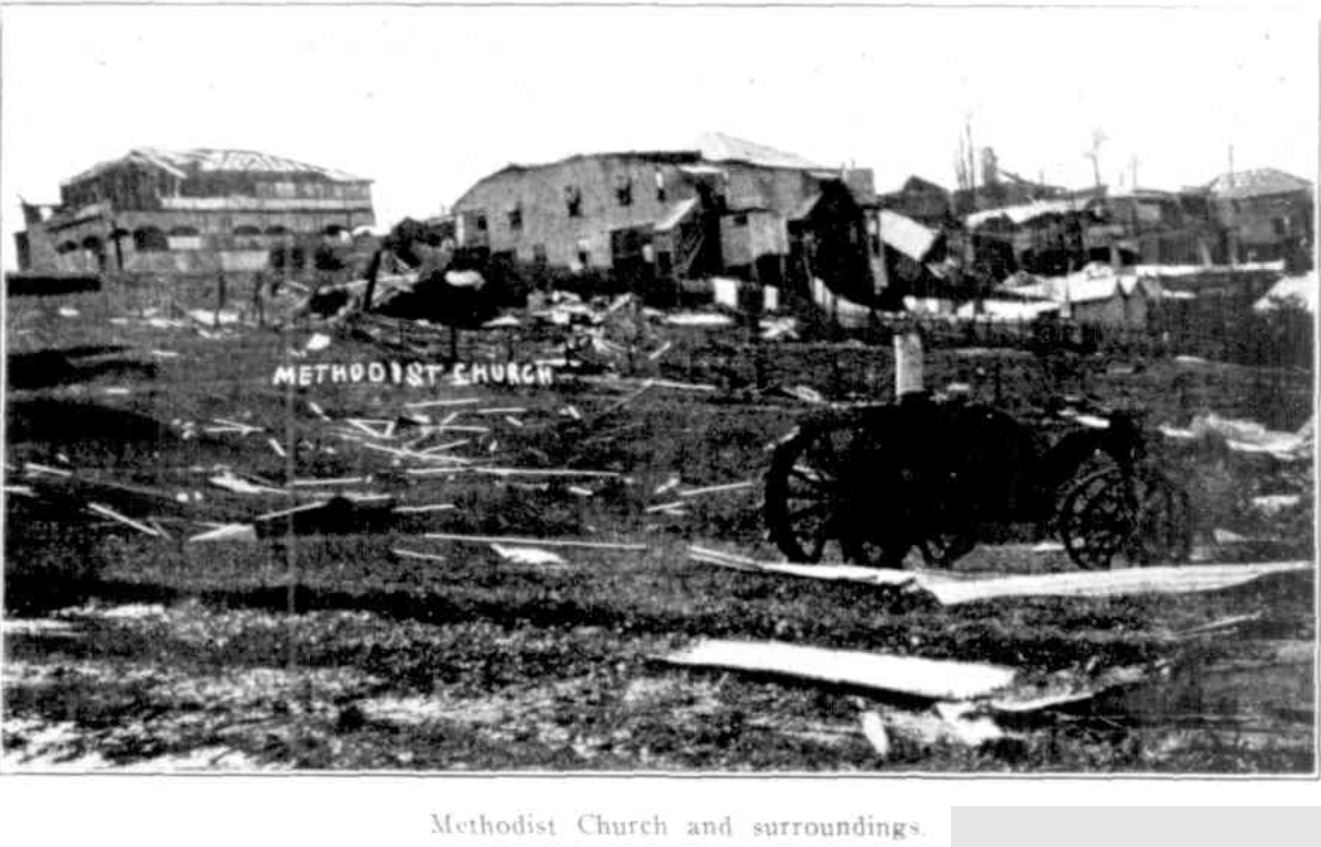
First Methodist Church at Innisfail, destroyed by a cyclone in 1918

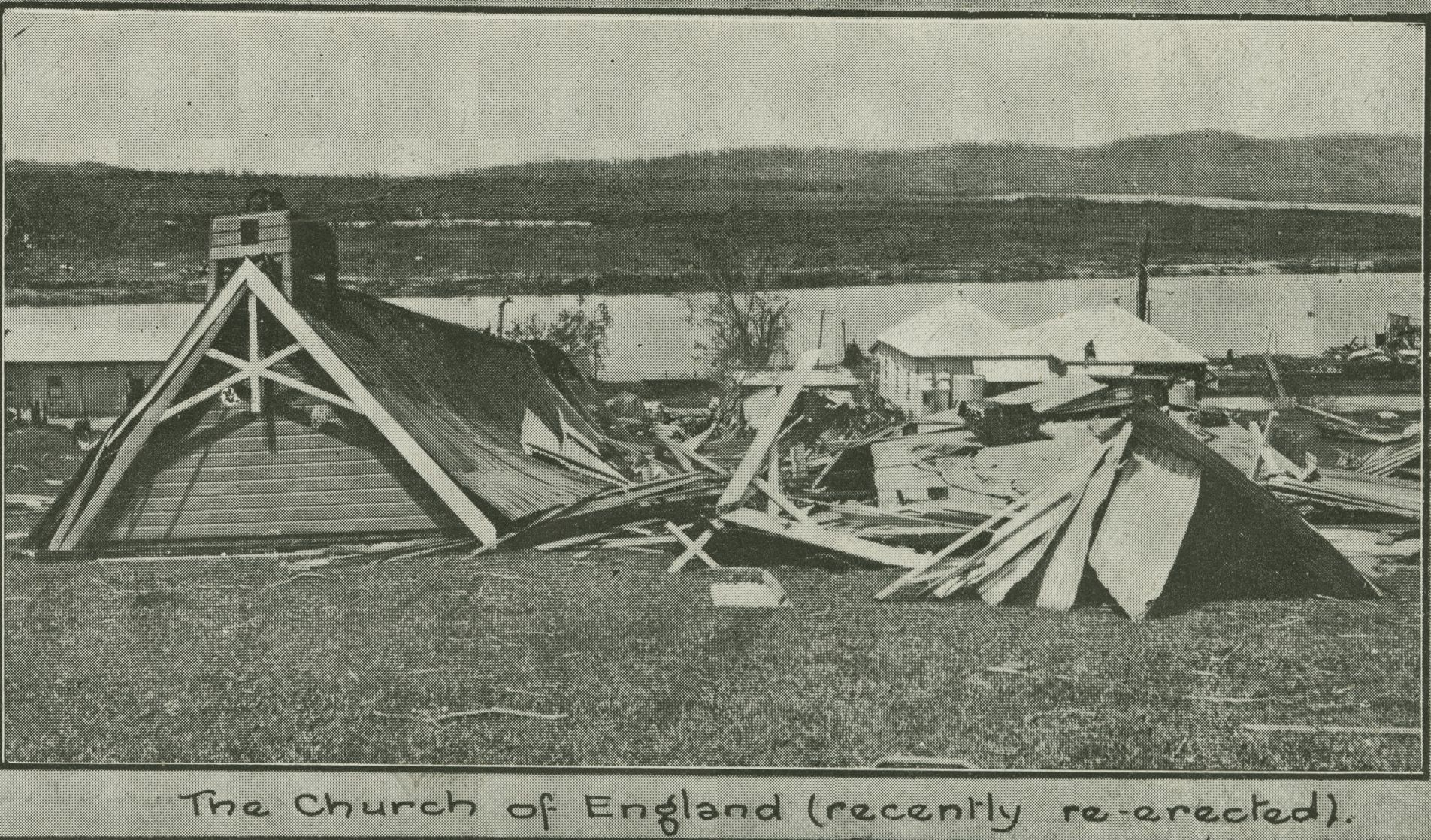
The Anglican Church, destroyed by the cyclone, 1918

A huge cyclone swept through Innisfail on 10 March 1918, causing immense damage and killing many people. Buildings destroyed included the Anglican Church and the Methodist Church. So many buildings were severely damaged, that many new buildings were erected after the cyclone using concrete rather than the more traditional timber with tin roof. As Art Deco architecture was popular at that time, many of the new buildings were built in the Art Deco style. As a result, Innisfail is now considered one of the best Australian towns for Art Deco and Streamline Moderne architecture.

The 1920s and 1930s saw the beginning of a major period of settlement by Italian immigrants and noteworthy populations from Greece and Malta. Later in this period populations from Yugoslavia, India and the Philippines would also settle in the area.

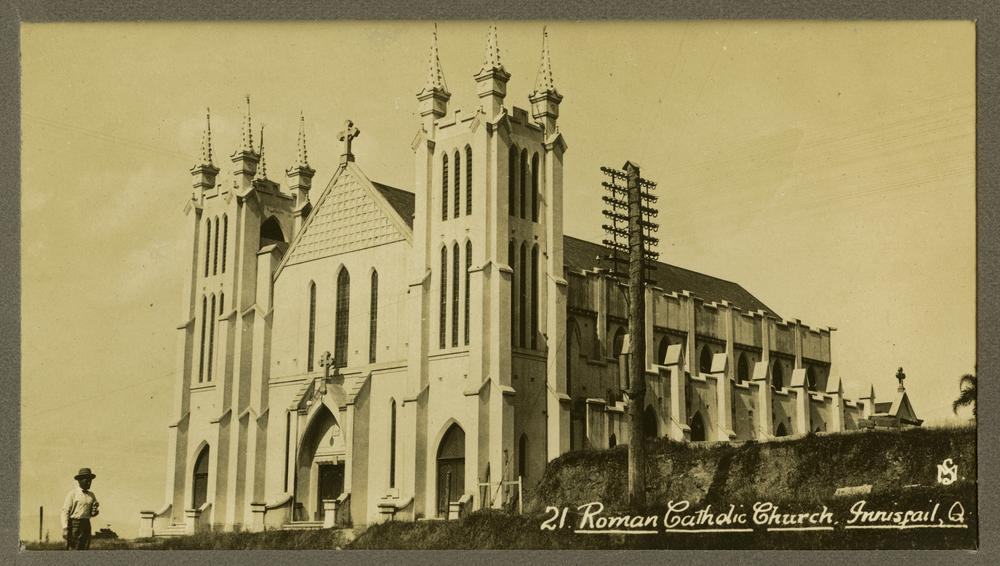
Mother of Good Counsel Catholic Church, 1930

On Sunday 1 July 1928, Bishop John Heavey officially opened and blessed the new Catholic presbytery, built of reinforced concrete to protect it from cyclones, after the Catholic church and associated buildings were all destroyed in the cyclone of 1918. Heavey returned some week later to officially open and bless the new Mother of Good Counsel Catholic Church which cost £20,000 and was described as the largest Catholic church in Queensland outside of its capital Brisbane.

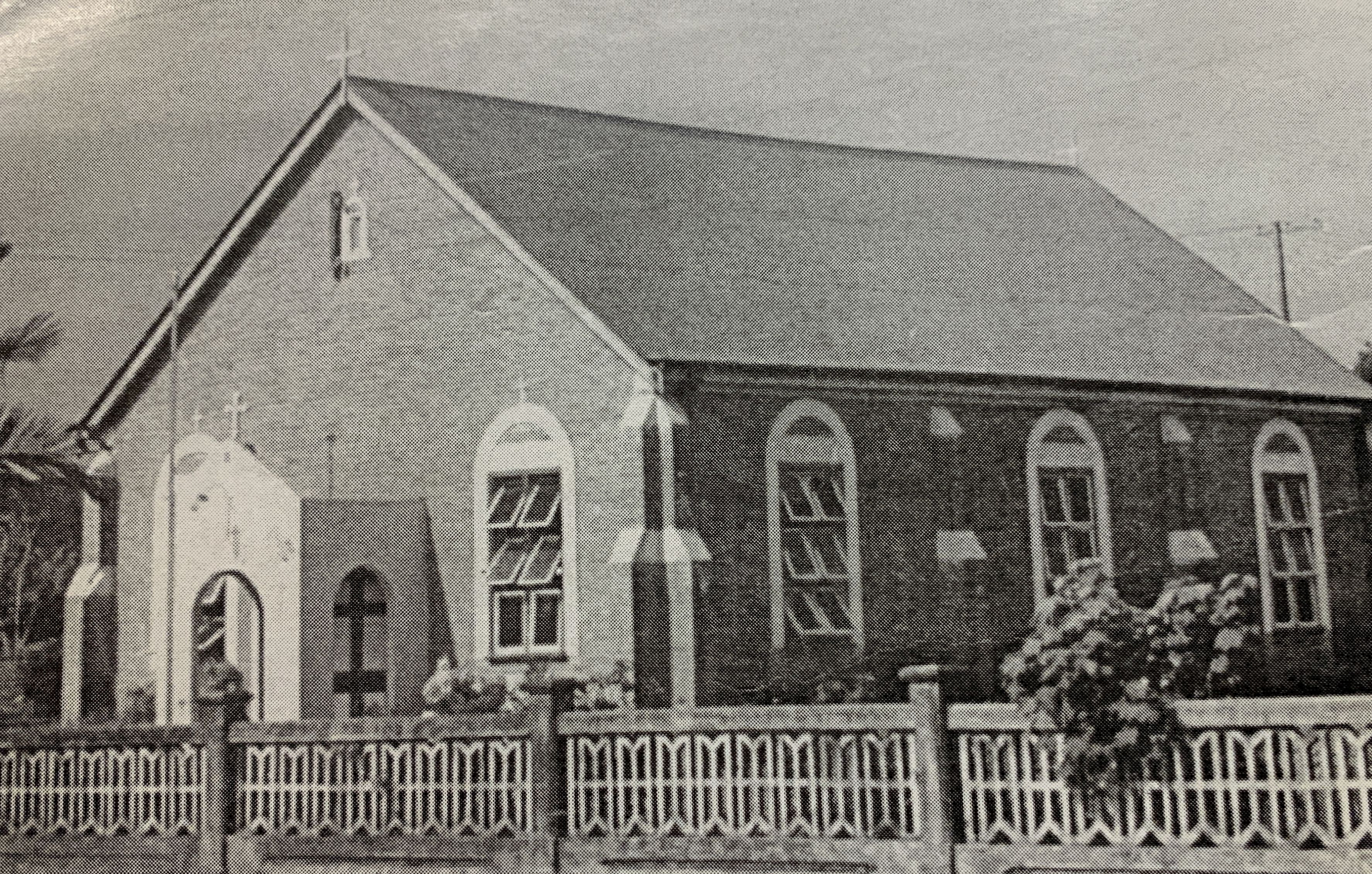
Greek Orthodox Church, late 1930s

On 31 March 1931, a civic reception was held for an international Cricket Team which was followed by a tree planting ceremony where a number of palm trees were planted commemorate the visit to Innisfail by the team. Among the team was cricketer, Sir Donald Bradman. Donald Bradman was part of the international team, led by New South Wales Captain, Alan Kippax in 1931. These palms still stand in the town centre.

On Sunday 10 November 1935, a Greek Orthodox Church was opened and dedicated to the Assumption of the Blessed Virgin (also known as the Dormition of Our Lady) by Archbishop Timotheos, the Greek Orthodox Archbishop for Australia and Oceania, in the presence of 300 people. It was the second Greek Orthodox Church to be built in Queensland and the sixth to be built in Australia, but the first to be built outside of an Australian capital city. The brick church cost £1,000. The church began to deteriorate and local builder Mick Kremastos re-built the church in 1970.

Innisfail East State School opened on 3 February 1936.

Innisfail State High School opened on 24 January 1955 and operated until the end of 2009 at 2 Stitt Street (Mighell, 17.5367°S 146.0280°E). In 2010, it was amalgamated with the Innisfail Inclusive Education Centre (a special education facility) and Tropical North Queensland TAFE (Innisfail Campus) to form Innisfail State College using the site of the TAFE campus at Innisfail Estate. Innisfail State High School's website was archived.

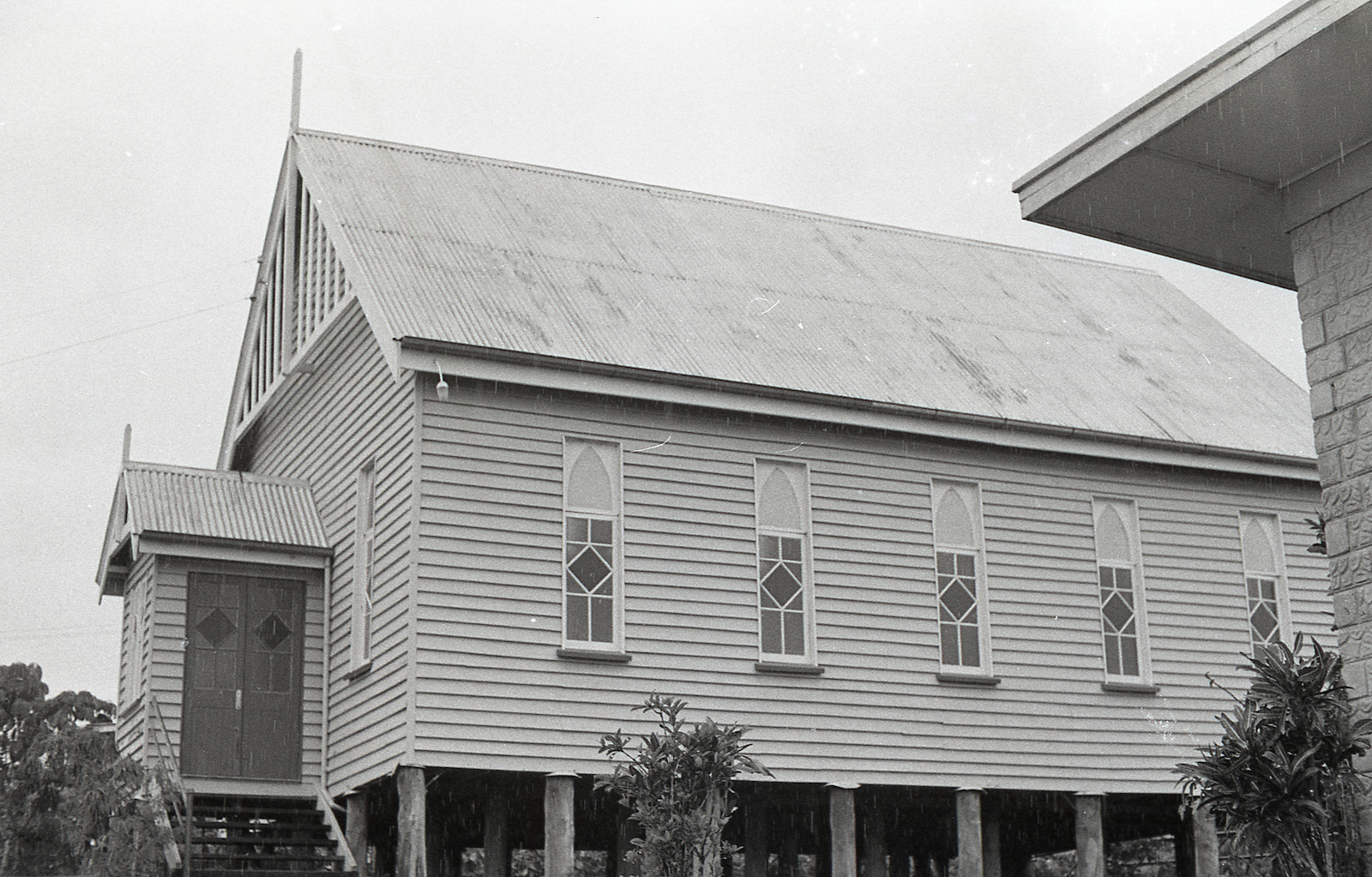
Methodist Church, 1975

On 3 July 1970, Innisfail State School introduced a special education program called Opportunity Classes. In 1980 these were replaced by the opening of Innisfail Special School on 29 January 1980. On 7 March 2003 the school was renamed Innisfail Inclusive Education Centre. In 2010 it was amalgamated into the Innisfail State College.

Radiant Life Christian College opened on 13 February 1982 and closed on 1 November 1991.

In 2001, Los Angeles band Sugar Ray filmed part of their music DVD "Music in High Places" at the Johnstone Crocodile Farm in Innisfail.

The Innisfail War Memorial in Jack Fossey Park on Fitzgerald Esplanade was dedicated on 16 April 2005; it commemorates those who served in all wars.

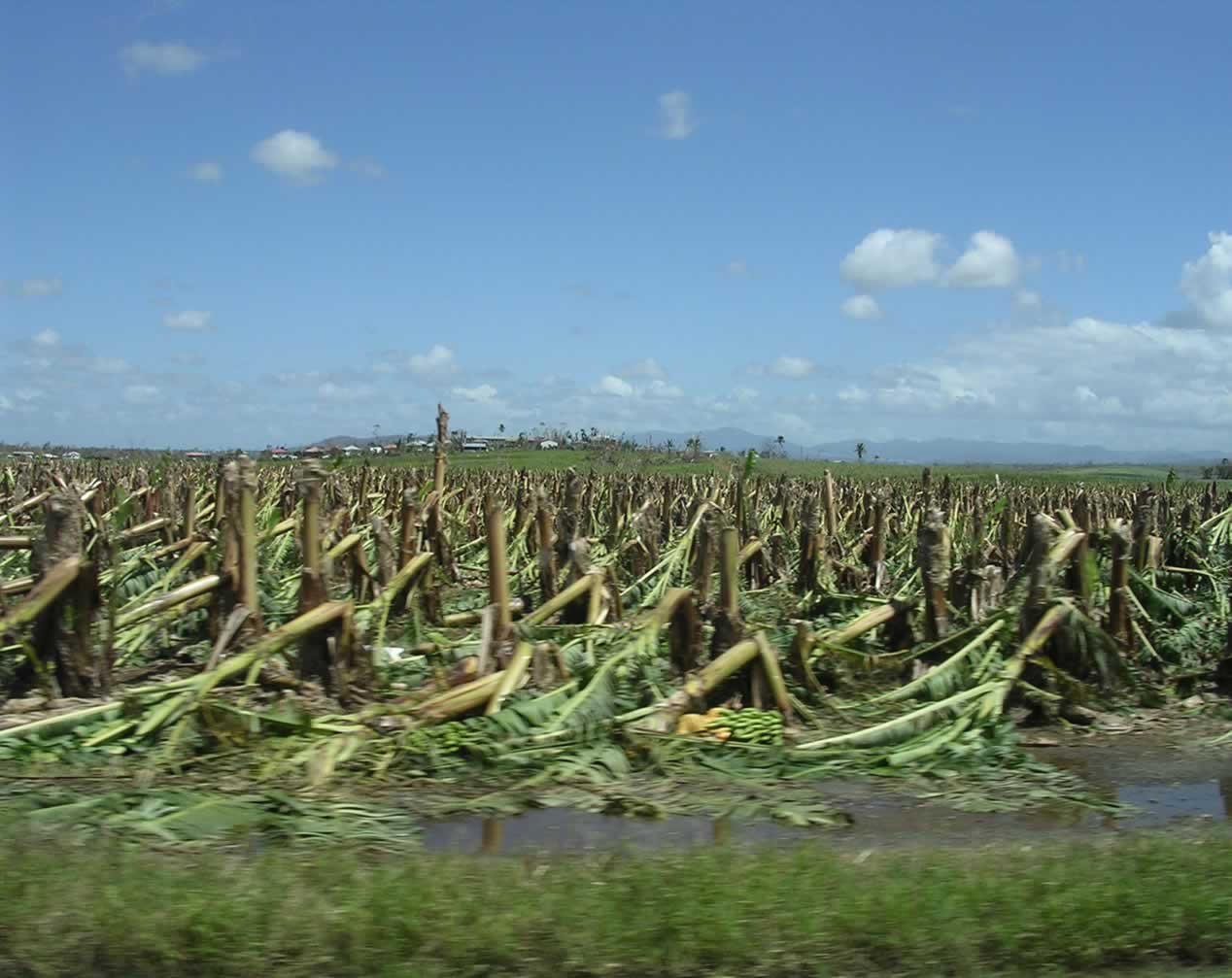
Innisfail Banana crops devastated by Cyclone Larry

Innisfail suffered extensive damage in 2006 due to tropical Cyclone Larry, an Australian Category 5 cyclone with over 100mm of rain in the span of three hours. It struck Innisfail at 7am on 20 March 2006, with the eye of the storm passing over the town.

Severe structural damage occurred over the entirety of the township, the main damage being a portion of houses losing roofs and windows and the cyclone rendered even more homes structurally unsound. Power was effectively eliminated from the town and generators became a luxury in many homes. Clean drinking water was also compromised in many homes leading to health fears. The swift response of the Australian Defence Force was praised by many and the cleanup campaign they orchestrated allowed for total utilities restoration within 3 weeks. Severe damage was done to crops and plantations (mainly bananas) which had a serious economic impact on the region. Only one indirect death was record as a result of the cyclone. While Innisfail was always reputed to have a positive sense of community spirit, the aftermath of Tropical Cyclone Larry and the unified cleanup effort acted to promote this spirit through shared suffering.

Cyclone Larry was a direct and primary cause of the widely reported and dramatic surge in banana prices in Australia. Inflated cost remained until farmers were able to meet demand again in early 2007. After the cyclone the township underwent something of an economic boom that stemmed from an influx of tradespeople and business eager to capitalise upon relatively significant insurance payouts. According to reports local trade had increased some 30–40% opposed to expected increases of 10%.

On 8 February 2007, the Johnstone Shire Council was sacked by the Queensland Government by the Local Government Minister, Andrew Fraser because of internal conflict, inappropriate behaviour and financial problems.

In 2011, in the early morning of 3 February, Cyclone Yasi crossed the far north Queensland coast causing damage to the Innisfail area. Although the damage was not as severe as Cyclone Larry, Cyclone Yasi still had a huge impact on Innisfail bringing strong winds of possibly 285 kilometres per hour.

Darlinga Forest School in February 2021 at 89 Mourilyan Road, East Innisfail. However, it was closed in mid-2023 by the Queensland Government's Non-State Schools Accreditation Board.

== Demographics ==
In the 2016 census, the town of Innisfail had a population of 7,236 people, which includes the urban and suburban parts of the localities of Innisfail, Cullinane, Innisfail Estate, East Innisfail, Webb, South Innisfail, Mighell, Goondi Hill, Hudson, and Goondi Bend. Within the town, Aboriginal and Torres Strait Islander people made up 17.3% of the population. 72.1% of people were born in Australia. The next most common countries of birth were India 4.0%, Italy 1.9% and England 1.8%.74.8% of people spoke only English at home. Other languages spoken at home included Punjabi 4.4% and Italian 2.8%. The most common responses for religion were Catholic 27.0%, No Religion 20.5% and Anglican 13.9%. The locality of Innisfail (the town's centre) had a population of 1,145 people.

In the 2021 census, the town of Innisfail had a population of 7,173 people, while the locality of Innisfail (the town's centre) had a population of 1,091 people.

== Education ==
Innisfail State School is a government primary (Preparatory to Year 6) school for boys and girls at 7 Emily Street (17.5183°S 146.0280°E). In 2018, the school had an enrolment of 165 students with 22 teachers (19 full-time equivalent) and 20 non-teaching staff (13 full-time equivalent). It includes a special education program known as Canecutters Cluster.

Good Counsel Primary School is a Catholic primary (Preparatory to Year 6) school for boys and girls at 96 Rankin Street (17.5212°S 146.0288°E). In 2018, the school had an enrolment of 279 students with 27 teachers (21 full-time equivalent) and 20 non-teaching staff (13 full-time equivalent).

Good Counsel College is a Catholic secondary (7 to 12) school for boys and girls at 66 Owen Street (17.5207°S 146.0285°E). In 2018, the school had an enrolment of 371 students with 41 teachers (39 full-time equivalent) and 31 non-teaching staff (24 full-time equivalent).

There is no government secondary school within the locality of Innisfail, as the town's government secondary school, Innisfail State College, is located in Innisfail Estate immediately across the river east of the main town centre.

== Amenities ==
The Cassowary Coast Regional Council operates a public library at 49 Rankin Street. The current library opened in 2015.

The Innisfail branch of the Queensland Country Women's Association meets at the CWA Hall at 1 McGowan Drive.

Chinese Australians built the Innisfail Temple / Lit Sing Gung (列聖宮) in Owen Street, which is now open to other races and religions.

The Sikh community has built the Sikh Temple / Guru Nanak Sikh Education Centre in East Innisfail.

Mother of Good Counsel Catholic Church is at 90 Rankin Street. It is within the Innisfail Parish of the Roman Catholic Diocese of Cairns.

The Dormition of Our Lady Greek Orthodox Church is at 133 Ernest Street (17.5189°S 146.0273°E). Their feast day is 15 August.

== Economy ==
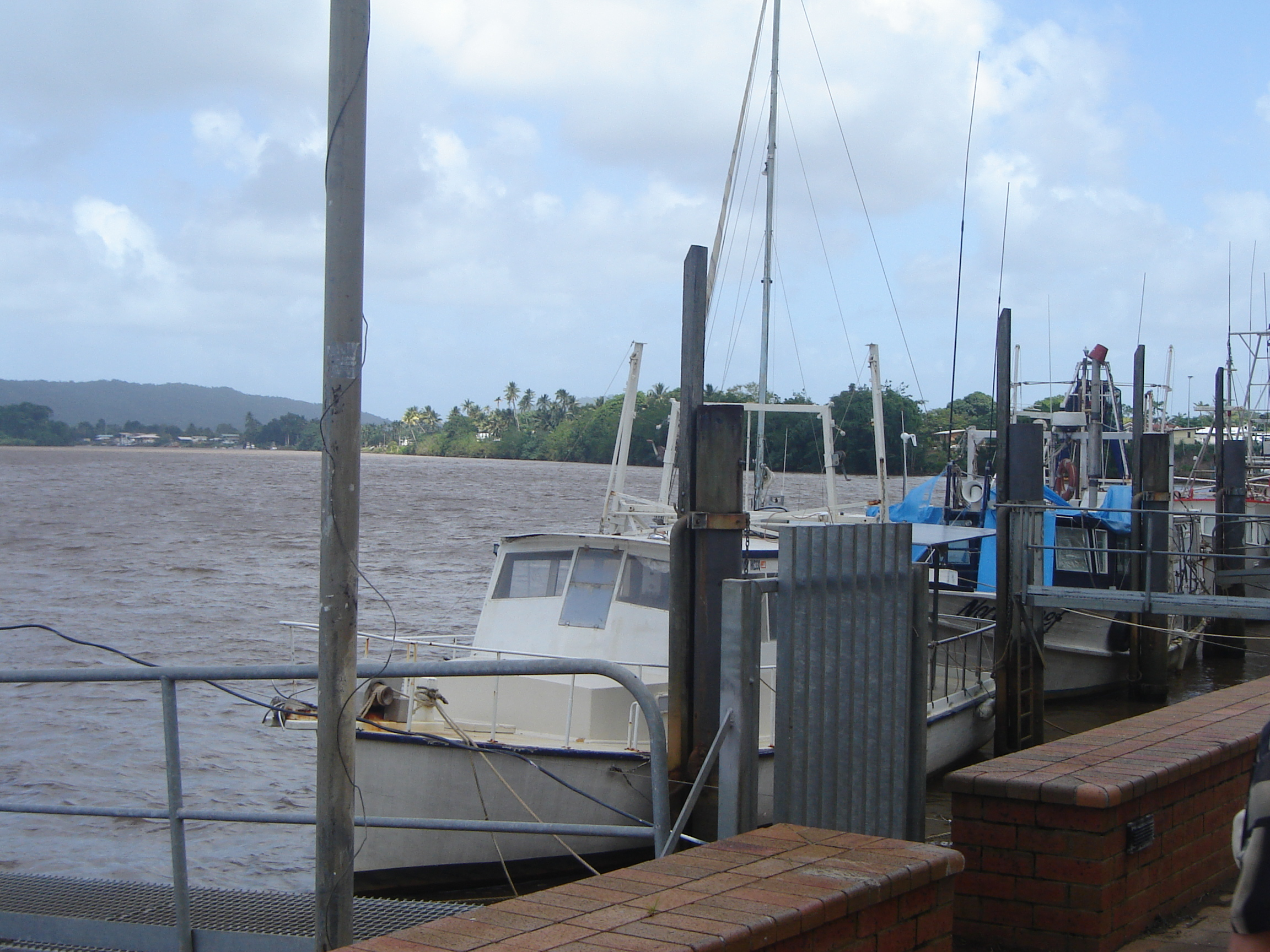
Johnstone River, Innisfail with prawn boats in foreground

The main industries remain predominately banana and sugar cane. Outlying areas of Innisfail also grow tea, pawpaws and other exotic fruits.

Innisfail remains a popular destination for backpackers seeking employment in the fruit picking industry. Tourism is of importance to the township and the town consistently seeks to attract visitors passing through on the Bruce Highway. The town's Art Deco architecture is a drawcard for many tourists.

== Heritage listings ==
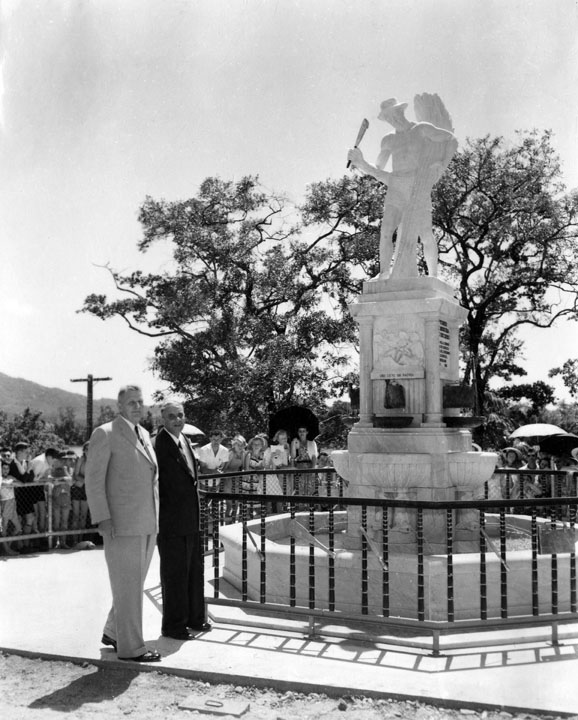
Canecutters Memorial

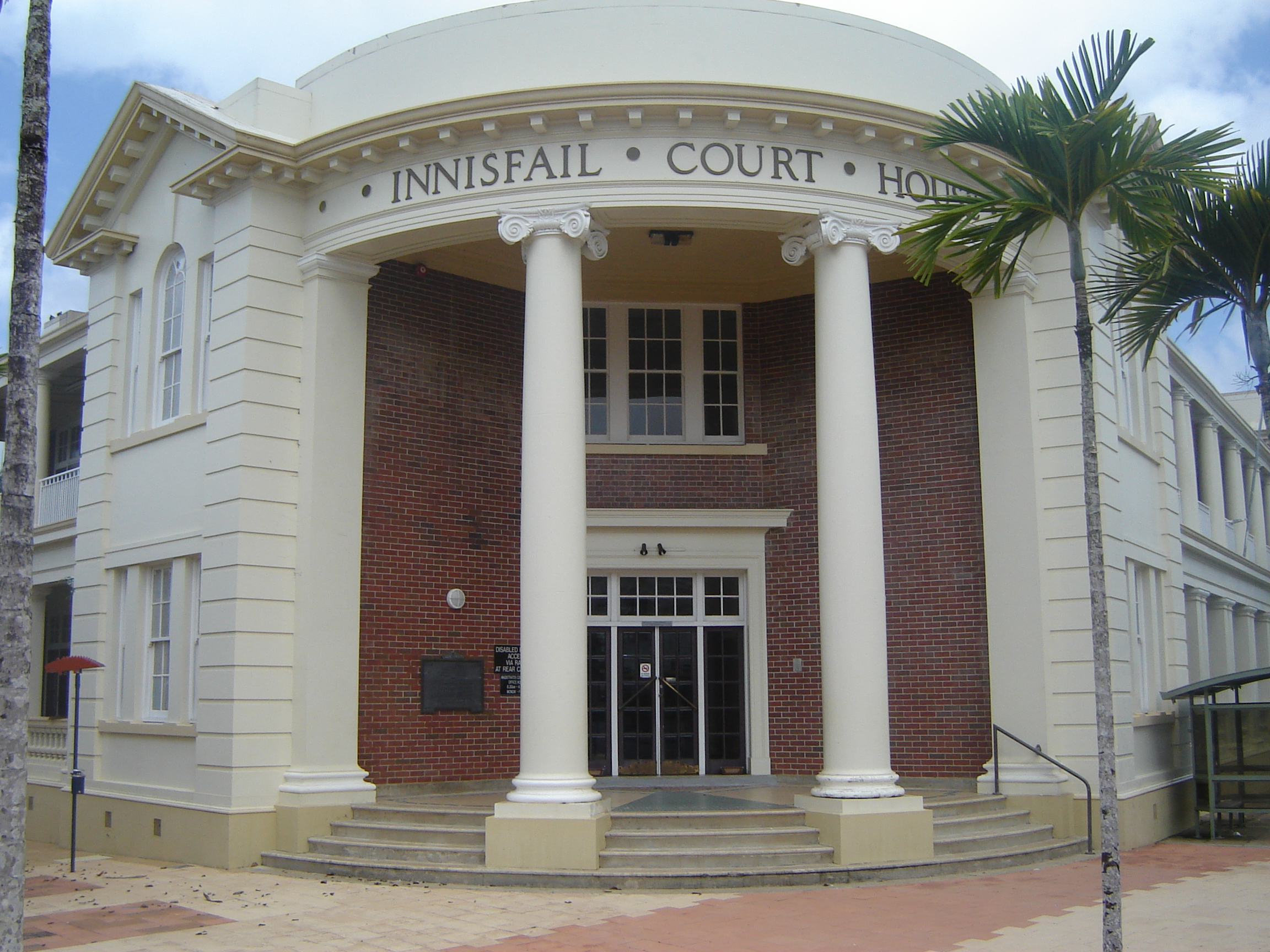
Court house

Innisfail has a number of heritage-listed sites, including:

- Innisfail Courthouse, 10 Edith Street
- See Poy House, 134 Edith Street
- Canecutters Memorial, Fitzgerald Esplanade
- Johnstone Shire Hall, 70 Rankin Street
- Mother of Good Counsel Catholic Church, 90 Rankin Street
- St Andrew's Presbyterian Memorial Church, 114 Rankin Street

== Events ==
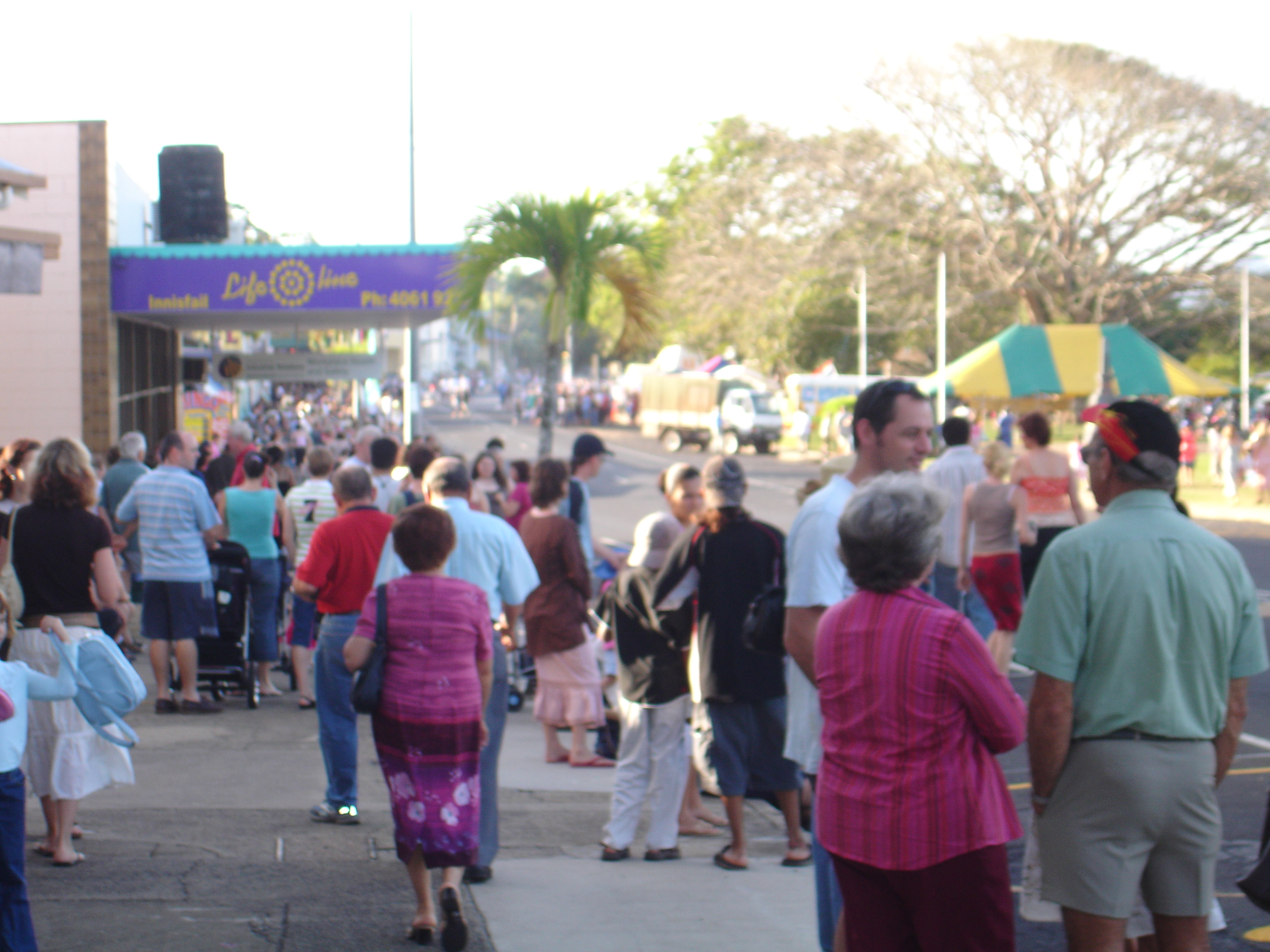
A large turnout of the Annual Harvest Festival Parade in 2005

Popular annual events to celebrate Innisfail's diversity include:

- Kulture Karnival
- Festival Innisfail
- Feast of the Senses
- Feast of the Three Saints
- Tropical Art Deco Festival

There are many events that act predominantly as community events, the main ones include:

- The Innisfail Rodeo
- Harvest Festival
- Innisfail Agricultural Show

== Notable residents ==
- Scott Bolton, rugby league player for the North Queensland Cowboys, grew up in Innisfail. Bolton debuted with the Cowboys in 2007 and has spent his entire career with the club, winning a premiership in 2015.Barring injury, the 32-year-old Innisfail product and Cowboys life member will play his final game against the Storm in Melbourne in Round 25, 2019.
- Kerry Boustead: former Queensland and Australian Rugby league great, Queensland's first ever try scorer in State of Origin rugby league. Kerry Boustead was also the only player from outside the Sydney and Brisbane Leagues selected to represent Australia on the 1978 Kangaroo tour.
- Michael Martin Clancy, first resident Parish Priest in Geraldton.
- Jessica-Rose Clark, mixed martial artist currently signed to the UFC.
- Steve Corica: retired footballer who was capped numerous times for Australia and played in England, notably for Wolverhampton Wanderers, was also capped over 100 times for Marconi Stallions in the ex-NSL and Sydney FC in the A-League.
- Brent Cockbain former international rugby player (2003 World cup for Wales) grew up in Innisfail.
- Ben Dunk, born 1987 Australia T20 and ODI cricket player
- Billy Slater, rugby league player, grew up in Innisfail. Billy Slater played for the Melbourne Storm for sixteen seasons in the NRL and was an Australian International and Queensland State of Origin representative fullback. He played his whole NRL career at Melbourne and won four grand finals, two Clive Churchill Medals and the Dally M Medal with the Storm before his retirement from the sport in 2018. He wrote an autobiography and is often considered one of the games best fullbacks.
- Norman Stevens, Australian boxer at 1980 Moscow Olympics
- Ty Williams, former professional rugby league footballer for the North Queensland Cowboys and Queensland grew up in Innisfail. Williams returned to Innisfail to captain/coach the Innisfail Leprechauns in 2014.

== In popular culture ==
- Elizabeth Haran's 2003 novel Sunset over Eden is set in the town.
- In March 2017, an Innisfail teenager survived a crocodile attack after entering the Johnstone River. Subsequent interviews with the survivor went viral online.

== See also ==
- Devil's Pool
- Innisfail railway station
- North Queensland
- Jubilee Bridge
