= Elizabeth Haran =

Australian novelist (born 1954)

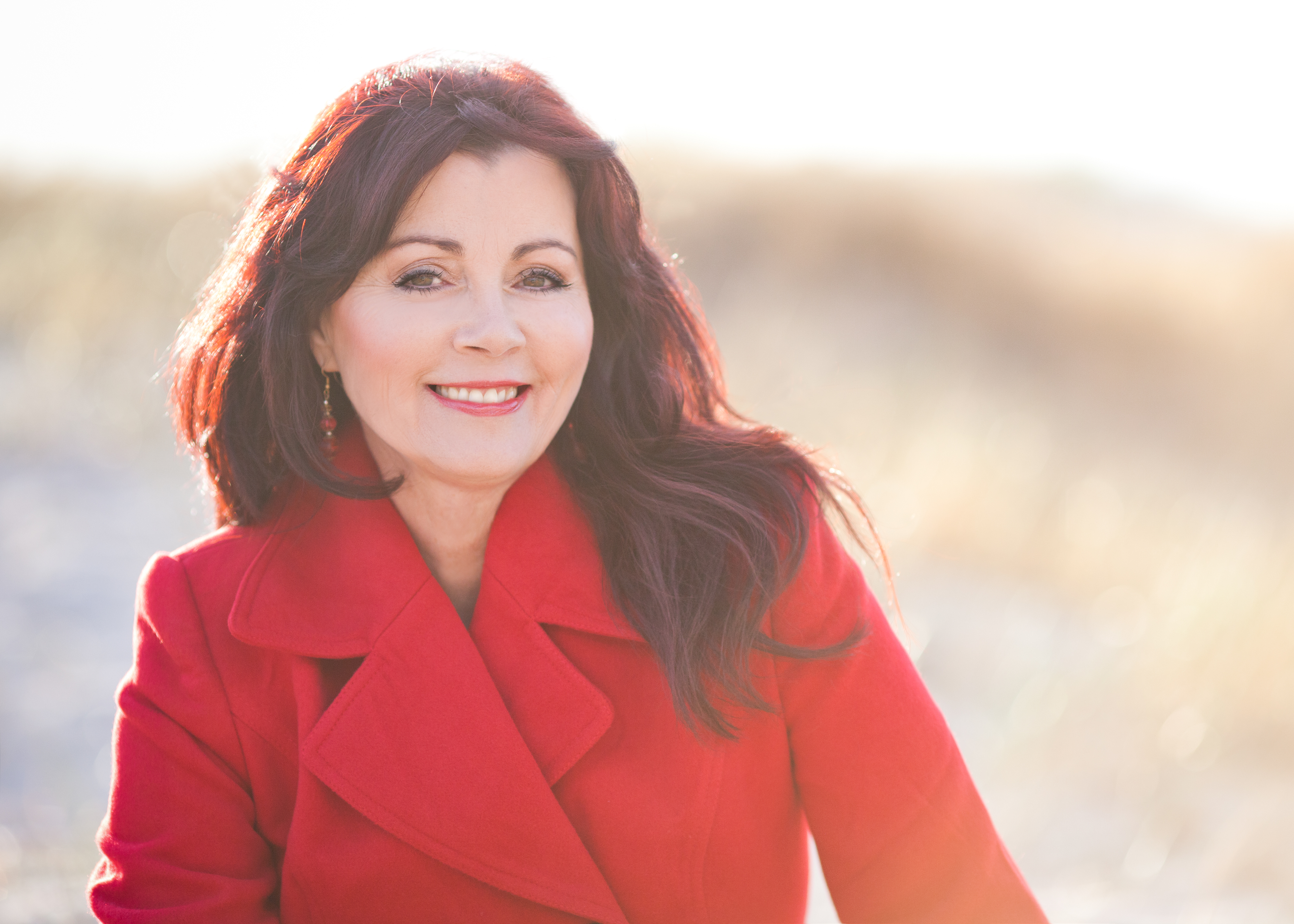
Elizabeth Haran, May 2013

Elizabeth Haran (born 1954) is an Australian novelist whose books were published in German and other European languages before being published in English. In the Valley of the Flaming Sun, published in 2007, spent eleven weeks on the German magazine Der Spiegel best seller list.

== Life ==
Haran was born in 1954 in Bulawayo, Zimbabwe (then Rhodesia), and migrated to Australia as a child. She began writing in her thirties, after the birth of her second son.

Haran lives in Largs Bay, South Australia with her family.

== Writing ==
Haran writes historical fiction, setting her novels in various parts of Australia in earlier centuries.

After being rejected by publishers in the UK and US, Haran's first novel was accepted by a German publisher in 1999, and appeared in 2001. She has written seventeen novels, all adventure/love stories set in Australia in the 19th and 20th centuries. She travels to the settings of her books to get a feel for the area and to do research. Her books have been published in more than ten countries (Germany, Bulgaria, France, Spain, Serbia, Russia, Croatia, Czech Republic, Slovakia, Poland, English speaking countries as e-books and Latvia), and have sold more than 1.5 million copies in Germany. Her novels are very popular in Germany.

== Works ==
Year	English title	German title	Czech title	Croatian title	Spanish title	French title
2001	A Woman For All Seasons	Im Land des Eukalyptusbaums				Au pays des eucalyptus
2002	The Heart of a Sunburned Land	Der Ruf des Abendvogels	Sluncem spálená země			
2003	Sunset over Eden	Im Glanz der roten Sonne		Suton iznad Edena		
2004	Stars in the Southern Sky	Ein Hoffungsstern am Himmel	Vyprahlé srdce			
2005	River of Fortune	Am Fluss des Schicksals	Divoké vody		El río de la fortuna	
2006	Whispers in the Wind	Die Insel der roten Erde	Zrádné útesy			
2007	Under a Flaming Sky	Im Tal der flammenden Sonne				
2008	The Tantanoola Tiger					
2009	Dance of the Fiery Blue Gums					
2010	A Faraway Place in the Sun					
2011	The Mundi-Mundi Legend					
2012	Beyond the Red Horizon				El brillo de la estrella del sur	
2013	Walkabout Country					
2015	Flight of the Jabiru	Träume unter roter sonne			El vuelo del jaribú	Le pays du soleil rouge
2016	Staircase to the Moon					
2017	In the valley of Rainbow mist	Im Tal der Eukalyptuswälder				
2018	A Capricorn Sun					

=== Sunset over Eden ===
This book is set in the Queensland sugar cane town of Innisfail. The town is just recovering after being devastated in a cyclone. This book was published in German, Slovak, Croatian, Czech and Russian.

=== Stars in the Southern Sky ===
This book is historical fiction set in Birdsville, Queensland, one of the most isolated towns in Australia. Elizabeth changed the name of the town to Kangaroo Crossing for the book. Foreign language editions of the book have been published in German, Czech, Slovak and Russian.

=== River of Fortune ===
This book was published in German, Czech, Slovak and Russian.

=== Whispers in the Wind ===
This book is set on Kangaroo Island, off the coast of South Australia, in 1845. This book was published in German, Czech, Slovak and Russian.

=== Dance of the Fiery Blue Gums ===
Dance of the Fiery Blue Gums, is set in the Clare Valley in 1866.

=== The Tantanoola Tiger ===
The Tantanoola Tiger is set in southeast South Australia in 1900.

=== The Heart of a Sunburned Land ===
Heart of a Sunburned Land is set in northern South Australia in the 1920s.

=== A Faraway Place in the Sun ===
A Faraway Place in the Sun is set in Port Adelaide and the Flinders Ranges in 1946.
