= Atherton Performing Arts Theatre =

- Location within Queensland
- 17.2672°S 145.4739°E
- Location: 6 Silo Street, Atherton, Tablelands Region, Queensland, Australia

History
- Design period: 1939–1945 (World War II)
- Built: 1943

Queensland Heritage Register
- Official name: Atherton Performing Arts Theatre (WWII Igloo)
- Type: state heritage
- Designated: 9 October 2015
- Reference no.: 650001
- Type: Defence: Depot stores/canteen
- Theme: Maintaining order: Defending the country

Atherton Performing Arts Theatre is a heritage-listed former military depot and now theatre at 6 Silo Street, Atherton, Tablelands Region, Queensland, Australia. It was built in 1943. It is also known as Atherton WWII Igloo. It was added to the Queensland Heritage Register on 9 October 2015.

== History ==
The steel-framed "igloo" located in Silo Road, Atherton, currently used as a theatre by Atherton Performing Arts (APA) Inc., is an American Rolling Mill Company (ARMCO) hut, erected c. 1943 at the 13th Australian Advance Ordnance Depot at Tolga. Although the term "igloo" is widely used to describe any corrugated iron-clad building with a roof that forms a complete arch to the ground, in the Queensland context it has been more specifically applied to buildings with open-lattice box truss arches made of nailed hardwood timber. Although originally intended to be covered with camouflage netting and used as aircraft hideouts, in Queensland these igloos were sheeted with iron and used as warehouses, hangars, workshops and recreation halls.

In 1947 the igloo was purchased by the Atherton Tableland Maize Marketing Board and was moved to its current location for use as a workshop, and the neighbouring gabled-roof workshop building was probably built at this time. The buildings later functioned as an Atherton Shire Council Depot from c. 1958 to 1979, before the igloo was refurbished as a theatre in 1982–83. The igloo is rare surviving built evidence of an important military facility, and helps demonstrate the impact of World War II (WWII) on the Atherton Tablelands, when the area was a major training and rest and rehabilitation centre for the Australian Imperial Force during the Pacific Campaign of World War II (WWII). The igloo's original steel segmented-arch frame is also a rare surviving wartime example of its type.

Atherton, the main centre on the Tablelands, was originally known as Prior's Pocket after Thomas Prior, a timber getter who was the first European to camp there permanently. The town, surveyed in 1885, was a staging post for Cobb and Co. coaches between the tin fields of Herberton (established 1880) and Port Douglas, and the Tablelands railway arrived from Cairns in 1903. Although timber drew many settlers to the area, the maize industry opened up the Atherton Tablelands to agriculture, and was the dominant agricultural industry of the southern Atherton Tablelands up until WWII. Chinese settlers were instrumental in setting up the industry during the late 19th century, but with the inception of the Soldier Settler Scheme in 1917, they were displaced by European farmers.

The Atherton Tableland Maize Board was constituted on 31 August 1923 under the Primary Products' Pools Act 1922. In 1924, the board erected three storage cluster silo complexes at Kairi, Tolga and Atherton (the latter included a drying plant); but only the Kairi Maize Silos survive. Despite the silos, the industry struggled. The state of the industry improved somewhat when the Maize Board in 1936 began manufacturing poultry rations, and the "Athmaize" brand of stock and poultry feeds was introduced. Newspaper articles also refer to "Athmaze". In 1993, due to deregulation of the maize industry, the Board was dissolved and its assets and liabilities were transferred to the Athmaize Producers' Cooperative Association on 1 March 1994. Athmaize went into liquidation in 2002. The maize industry continues as a small section of the local economy, and dairy farming is now Atherton's main industry.

The Atherton Tablelands was disrupted by a massive influx of military forces during WWII. United States Army Air Forces (USAAF) units were based at Mareeba from mid-1942, along with a US hospital and US Anti-Aircraft units. During 1943 USAAF units at Mareeba airfield were replaced with Royal Australian Air Force (RAAF) units. From December 1942 the headquarters of the Australian Army in north Queensland transferred from Townsville to the Atherton Tablelands, and the main administrative base was established around Atherton and the nearby settlement of Tolga. The Headquarters of the 1st Australian Army was in Atherton, and the HQ of 1st Australian Corps was at Tolga. The terrain and climate of New Guinea meant that Australian troops had to be regularly rested and rehabilitated. The Atherton Tablelands was chosen for this purpose as it was close to New Guinea, near the port of Cairns, was suitable for jungle warfare training, and was mostly malaria-free.

The troops resting and training on the Tablelands had to be housed and supplied, and so, as an important part of Australian wartime strategy, a huge schedule of construction work (the "Atherton Project") commenced, to accommodate units from the 6th and 7th Divisions of the Second Australian Imperial Force (AIF) returning from New Guinea - and the 9th Division (AIF) returning from the Middle East – plus other fighting units. The project constructed tent encampments, hutments, mess kitchens, hospitals and storage sheds, under the direction of the Allied Works Council (AWC), Australian Army General Hospitals were established at Rocky Creek, north of Tolga, In addition, a RAAF Advanced Chain Overseas (ACO) Radar Station operated from Bones Knob, west of Tolga. which formed in February 1942 to co-ordinate and facilitate the needs of Australian and US military forces in Australia during the war. The AWC's work on defence projects in Queensland, including roads and airfields, was carried out by US Army engineers, the Queensland Main Roads Commission (MRC), and contractors drawing on conscripted civilian labour from the Civil Constructional Corps (CCC), established in April 1942.

Up to 100,000 troops were present on the Tablelands. Units of the three AIF infantry divisions camped at Danbulla, Kairi, Millstream, Ravenshoe, Tinaroo, Wondecla and Wongabel between early 1943 and 1945, and all three divisions were on the Tablelands at one time in late 1944. In Atherton, the Barron Valley Hotel briefly acted as a headquarters for General Thomas Blamey, commander-in-chief of the Australian Military Forces. An Australian Army cordial factory was also built in Atherton. This was moved to Hopkins Road, east of the rear of the theatre igloo, sometime after WWII, but it was demolished in 2006. and in November 1943 a large timber-framed igloo warehouse (now the Merriland Hall) was erected at the Atherton Showground for the Australian Army Canteen Services (AACS). After WWII the warehouse became a community centre, was renamed Merriland Hall, and was used by the Atherton Choral Society and the Atherton Players, amongst others.

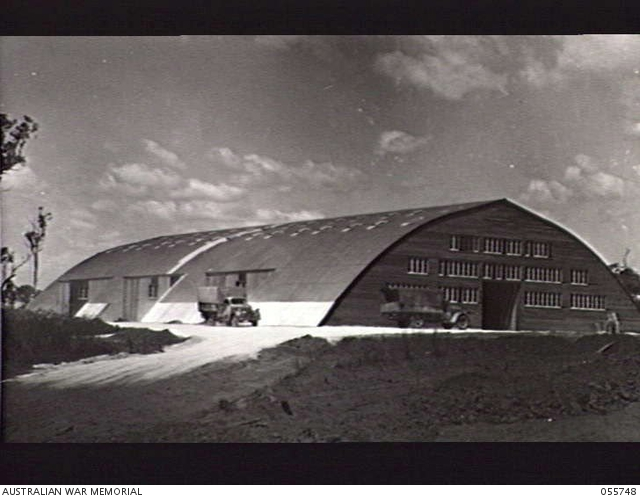
Igloo of the 13th Australian Advance Ordnance Depot, Tolga, 1943

The igloo now at Atherton was constructed as part of the 13th Australian Advanced Ordnance Depot (13 AAOD) at Tolga, the largest Australian Army storage and repair centre on the Tablelands. Built to supply equipment and weapons to the troops, 13 AAOD was established on the west side of Tolga early in 1943. It was located north of Griffin Road and either side of Tate Road. The AWC also built Ordnance workshops for the Australian Army at Brisbane, Toowoomba, Townsville, Charters Towers and Baronta. In February 1943, a schedule of Atherton Tablelands projects included ten 100-by-40-foot (30 m × 12 m) "ARMCO huts" at Tolga. No other ARMCO huts of this type seem to have been erected by the Allied Works Council in Queensland; the three ARMCO ammunition stores ordered for Queerah (Cairns) in 1943 were most likely of a different type. According to a report on an October 1944 visit to 13 AAOD by the Joint Parliamentary War Expenditure Advisory Committee, by then the installation consisted of about 170 buildings, including 18 large igloo stores about 200 by 100 feet (61 m × 30 m). The unit that supervised work on the AACS igloo in Atherton, the 54th Australian Deputy Commander Royal Engineers (Works), also constructed the large timber framed igloos at 13 AAOD at Tolga, the AACS igloo, 13 AAOD igloos, 10 steel-framed ARMCO buildings and 22 steel-framed Sidney Williams buildings. However, a 1944 plan of 13 AAOD shows 16 buildings 200 by 100 feet (61 m × 30 m); with the other two being about 100 by 100 feet (30 m × 30 m). The location and size of these 18 large igloos is confirmed in a post-war aerial photograph of the site . There also appears to be 10 concrete slabs of about 100 by 40 feet (30 m × 12 m) in the aerial photo (in the Returned Stores Depot and Ordnance areas), which match the size of the 10 ARMCO igloos.

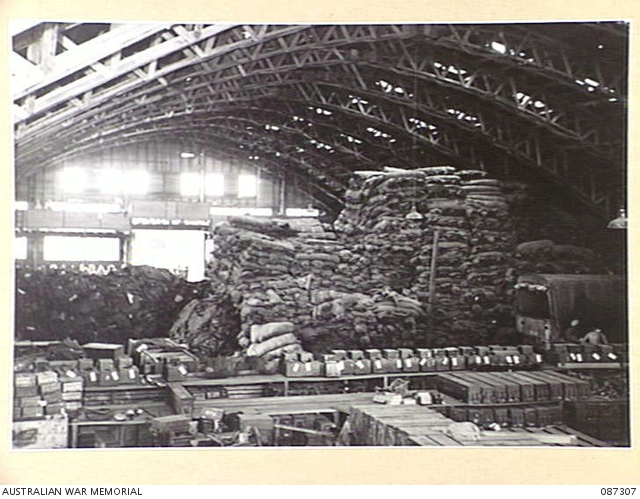
Returned Store Depot, Tolga, 1945

13 AAOD was divided into four depots, including a Returned Stores Depot (RSD). It also included a salvage area, a vehicle park; and workshops. Units at 13 AAOD included 5 Australian RSD, 1 Australian Advanced Workshop Salvage Unit, 7 Australian Ordnance Vehicle Park, 3 Australian Advanced Base Workshop Australian Electrical and Mechanical Engineers (AEME), 124 Australian Forward Ordnance Depot, and 73 Australian Field Ammunition Depot. Just to the north was 7 Australian Advanced Ammunition Depot.

The ARMCO igloos at 13 AAOD were probably built in Australia. The American Rolling Mill Company (ARMCO Steel Corporation from 1948) was formed in 1899, to produce rolled steel. The company's first factory was in Middleton, Ohio, and its first overseas factory opened in 1914 in Brazil. In 1936 the Australian Government announced that ARMCO would join with Lysaght to establish a £1,000,000 company in Australia. This decision was touted as a success for the government's "trade diversion policy", which aimed to encourage car manufacture in Australia, as ARMCO and John Lysaght Ltd would manufacture steel motor body panels. An ARMCO works was constructed at Port Kembla in 1938, and opened in January 1939.

During WWII, ARMCO (Australia) Pty Ltd manufactured circular corrugated steel pillboxes, and large culvert pipes for use by the Australian armed forces. In addition, ARMCO ammunition storage huts, with a curved structure of heavy gauge corrugated steel designed to be covered in earth, were constructed at Darra and Mount Coot-tha (Brisbane) and Burua (Gladstone). Some examples of these ARMCO ammunition storage huts, with a floor space of 1000 square feet, survive on Mount Coot-tha. They did not use an arched framework system, as the corrugated steel provided sufficient structural support. ARMCO also produced igloo-style huts, with a 100 by 40 feet (30 m × 12 m) floor area. These were advertised for use storing wool, wheat, farm produce or general merchandise, with the claim that "ARMCO pre-fabricated huts are weather and vermin-proof, economical and durable". ARMCO also produced gable-roofed huts, and these - plus the ARMCO igloos - were advertised well into the post war period, in various spans and lengths. Gabled ARMCO huts were 12, 20, 30 or 40 feet (3.7, 6.1, 9.1 or 12.2 m) wide, and could be built in multiples of 10 feet (3.0 m) long. ARMCO igloos could also be 60 feet (18 m) or 100 feet (30 m) wide.

While ARMCO huts could be purchased new after the war, civilians also purchased and removed used buildings from former military facilities. All the igloos at 13 AAOD were removed after the closure of the depot in 1946, including the 10 ARMCO igloos, and the area reverted to farm and grazing land, although many of the slabs of the large timber-framed igloos are still visible. Other known surviving buildings from 13 AAOD include:

- a Sidney Williams hut from Tolga which existed near Railway Lane, Atherton, in the 1990s
- a Sidney Williams hut survived on Hastie Road, Atherton (as at 2015)
- a Sidney Williams hut and a cookhouse survived in Tolga in the 1990s

An advertisement for a February 1947 auction of 55 buildings at 13 AAOD and 7 Australian Ordnance Vehicle Park at Tolga, by the Commonwealth Disposals Commission, listed six Sidney Williams buildings of various sizes, five 200 by 100 feet (61 m × 30 m) igloos, two 100 by 60 feet (30 m × 18 m) igloos, and "five ARMCO All-Steel Igloos, overall 101 by 40 feet (31 m × 12 m), approximately half terne and half black iron"; terne is a lead-tin alloy coating for steel cladding; black iron is steel without a protective coat. Another four ARMCO igloos, 100 by 50 feet (30 m × 15 m) were advertised for auction in April 1947.

One of the ARMCO igloos from 13 AAOD was purchased by the Atherton Tableland Maize Board, which had been renamed the Atherton Tableland Maize Marketing Board by January 1947. The Maize Board had been considering obtaining a steel framed igloo since September 1945, to expand its mash manufacture. Such an igloo at Tolga was soon inspected by board members and deemed suitable, and at the October monthly meeting of the board the acquisition of a nearby site, for relocation of the igloo, was discussed. Although an application from the Maize Board for a government loan to purchase the igloo was withdrawn in early 1946, due to the cost of disassembly and re-erection, the purchase later went ahead, and by June 1947 the ARMCO igloo purchased at Tolga was being erected in Atherton "for a workshop and storage for the field working plants".

Survey plans reveal the ARMCO igloo's current site in Silo Road, Atherton, was part of a larger allotment obtained by the Atherton Tableland Maize Board during 1946. The land between the igloo site and the railway had previously been obtained by the Maize Board in 1941–42. This allotment was subdivided in 1949, and the igloo site was later occupied by the Athmaize Workshop Co-op Association Ltd.

The relocated ARMCO igloo began its new life as part of a workshops complex for farming equipment. The workshops were opened on 8 October 1947 at an annual meeting of maize growers. It was noted that the 'workshops were 'installed under cover of a reconstructed igloo and are adjacent to the Board's offices'. The Board's offices were in a building (demolished between 2002 and 2010) to the northwest of the workshops. The manager of the Board (William James Brett) said the workshops had been equipped with modern machinery and competent staff; charges on repairs to grower's machinery would be kept to a minimum, and the onus was on maize growers to "use the shops for all their repair work". No mention is made of the adjacent gabled workshop building on the northwest side of the ARMCO igloo, but it may have been erected at the same time the ARMCO igloo was re-erected. The igloo and the adjacent gabled building to its northwest are both present in a 1949 aerial photograph of Atherton. Another metal-clad, gable-roofed building, adjacent to the igloo on the southeast side, was constructed on the site between 1949 and 1951, but was demolished after 2013. The workshops complex was used by the Maize Marketing Board for almost 11 years.

Between approximately 1958 and 1979 the site was used by the Atherton Shire Council as a depot. A Reserve for Local Government Purposes was gazetted in September 1958, and again in 1973, after the northeast corner of the site was excised.

The current use of the ARMCO igloo and the attached gabled building, as a theatre and props store respectively, resulted from the formation of the Atherton Performing Arts (APA) group in June 1979, when the Atherton Choral Society and Atherton Players combined. APA was granted a lease of the workshops c. 1981. The igloo was cleaned and refurbished, with removable additions, lighting and internal fixtures. A stage was built inside the igloo in 1982, and plans from that year include an office and kitchen (taking up half of the igloo's floor-to-ceiling space) at the front (southwest end) of the igloo, either side of an entry foyer, with a lighting gallery above. The stage area in the rear (northeast) half of the igloo had a backstage area behind it, with two dressing rooms in the rear corners. Apart from new double doors at the front and rear of the igloo, a new exit to the northwest side of the front half of the igloo passed over a drain and between the rear of the adjacent gable roofed building and a "future toilet block". An exit is also shown on the northwest side at the rear of the igloo. A roller door was later added on the southeast side, at the rear of the igloo, about 1997.

In the 1982 plan, new sliding glass windows were to be added to either side of the rear doors, and new glass louvre panels above the doors (to supplement the existing two windows); while the front elevation was to be re-sheeted, with two new sliding glass windows to be added either side of the front doors, and one sliding glass window above the doors (replacing the original two windows). Neither of these configurations match the existing window arrangements in 2015 at either end of the igloo. The 1982 plans do not show the ventilators that currently exist along apex of the igloo.

The additions indicated on the 1982 plan were implemented in stages. In 1983 the roof metal was replaced at the front of the igloo, and a mezzanine floor for lighting was added at the front, while theatre lighting and auditorium carpet were later added. The kitchen was installed in the late 1980s; photographs indicate that the kitchen, and its window to the left of the igloo's front doors, was added c. 1986–7. The rest of the igloo's cladding also appears to have been replaced at some point. Dressing rooms, a makeup area and upstairs wardrobe areas were added in 1998, and a new backstage area was opened in 1999. New interlocking theatre seating was installed in 2009, and new carpet in 2011. In its ongoing role, the ARMCO igloo has been used for youth theatre, concerts, plays, musicals, poetry, play readings and musical instrumental events, as well as regular Eisteddfods (festivals of literature, music and performance, originating in Wales).

Of the 10 ARMCO igloos erected at 13 AAOD, the APA theatre igloo is the last known surviving example on the Atherton Tablelands. The segmented-arch frame profile differs from the other steel-framed igloo types erected in WWII Queensland, such as Nissen or Quonset huts. Another ARMCO igloo, of the same size and framework structure, survives at Dutton Street in Cairns, and this may also have been moved from 13 AAOD. The ARMCO igloo in Dutton Street, Cairns was moved to the site after 1952. Two other 100-by-40-foot (30 m × 12 m) ARMCO igloos, located at Ergon Energy's McLeod Street Depot, Cairns were demolished in 2007. The McLeod Street igloos were apparently surplus military buildings relocated from the Martyn Street council depot after WWII. The two igloos, which were at the McLeod Street site by 1949, are identified as Quonset huts, but the framework matches the ARMCO style; 100-by-40-foot (30 m × 12 m) Quonset hut arches form a smooth curve, and are spaced 4 feet (1.2 m) apart. A third igloo at the McLeod Street depot (frame type unconfirmed) survives, measuring 100 by 60 feet (30 m × 18 m).

Other WWII igloos survive on the Tablelands at:

- the Malanda Showgrounds (former theatre igloo, from Danbulla, with a steel frame)
- Rocky Creek (theatre igloo, with a timber frame)
- Wondecla (theatre igloo, with timber frame)
- Mareeba (larger timber framed igloo), now Beck's aero museum
- Atherton's Merriland Hall

There is also a steel-framed igloo at Malanda (a Mitre 10 store in 2015), which is possibly a larger 100-by-60-foot (30 m × 18 m) ARMCO, but it was purchased post-war in a kit form; and a steel-framed igloo (purchased in kit form, post-war) exists on Railway Lane in Atherton (about 120 by 90 feet (37 m × 27 m)).

The ARMCO igloo and the adjacent gabled roof former workshop building are the last remnants of the Atherton Tableland Maize Marketing Boards' complex in Atherton, as the silos and office were demolished between 2002 and 2010. The theatre buildings are now surrounded on three sides by car parking for the Silo Shopping Centre, located on the opposite side of Silo Road.

== Description ==
The Atherton Performing Arts Theatre (former WWII Igloo) occupies part of a 1,098-square-metre (11,820 sq ft) allotment on the western edge of Atherton's central business district in the Tablelands Region of northern Queensland. The allotment is bounded by Silo Street to the southwest, Hopkins Road to the southeast and car-parking for the Silo Central Shopping Centre to the northeast and northwest. The buildings face southwest and comprise a steel-framed, igloo-style ARMCO hut, and a former gabled-roof workshop on the northwest side of the igloo. The two buildings are separated by a concrete surface drain. A low skillion roof shelters the doorways that connect the two structures. Additional car-parking for the shopping centre is located in the southeast section of the allotment.

=== ARMCO igloo ===
The ARMCO igloo is a long, steel-framed structure that is semi-circular in section, has profiled and corrugated metal-clad end-walls, a corrugated metal-clad roof and a concrete slab floor. The metal wall and roof cladding is modern. The building is approximately 38 feet 9 inches (11.81 m) wide x 98 feet 9 inches (30.10 m) in length. It is primarily accessed via the front (southwest) elevation, with secondary entrances from the other three elevations. All doors, windows and external awnings are modern additions or replacements; with most moved from their original locations.

The steel framing structure is exposed to the interior. It consists of 21 D-shaped arches aligned at 1.5-metre (4 ft 11 in) intervals; with the feet of the arches set into the concrete slab. Each arch has eight 7 feet 5 inches (2.26 m) long, heavy gauge steel members of an 8-by-2-inch (203 mm × 51 mm) channel (C)-section. The members are fastened to each other by a cleat and interlock at an angle – creating the overall, semi-circular form. The interlocking joints are each secured by nuts and bolts. Metal battens connect the external cladding to the arches.

The interior is divided into areas established by the building's functioning as a performing arts hall. These areas include: a foyer, kitchen and office space at the southwest end; an auditorium and stage area in the centre; and a backstage area with dressing rooms at the northeast end. Separated from the external structure, modern lightweight partitions define each of the spaces. The floor of the auditorium is lined in modern carpet, and the modern stage area is raised with a timber structure.

=== Gabled-roof workshop ===
The gabled-roof workshop has a corrugated metal-clad gable roof and a concrete slab floor. The interior comprises a single, open space that is two storeys in height. At the rear of the workshop is a later skillion-roofed section, which includes a corrugated metal-clad passageway from the igloo, and a toilet wing with concrete block walls and a concrete slab floor. This workshop is not of cultural heritage significance.

== Heritage listing ==
Atherton Performing Arts Theatre was listed on the Queensland Heritage Register on 9 October 2015 having satisfied the following criteria.

The place is important in demonstrating the evolution or pattern of Queensland's history.

The Atherton Performing Arts Theatre (WWII Igloo) (1943), a rare surviving building from the 13th Australian Advanced Ordnance Depot (13 AAOD) at Tolga, is important in demonstrating the role of the Atherton Tablelands as the principal Australian base for all three Australian Imperial Force (AIF) infantry divisions during the Pacific Campaign of World War II (WWII). The concentration of Australian Army units on the Atherton Tablelands from early 1943 was an important part of Australia's military strategy, and 13 AAOD was the largest supply depot for those units.

The igloo's relocation to the site of the Atherton Tableland Maize Marketing Board's workshops in 1947 illustrates the common post-war practice of selling ex-military buildings for removal and civilian reuse.

The place is important in demonstrating the principal characteristics of a particular class of cultural places.

The igloo is rare as one of two known surviving examples of an igloo-style 100-by-40-foot (30 m × 12 m) ARMCO hut, erected and used in Queensland during WWII. In retaining its steel segmented-arch frame in its original form, it is important in demonstrating the prefabricated and portable framing system of an igloo-style ARMCO hut.
