= Atherton State School Head Teacher's Residence =

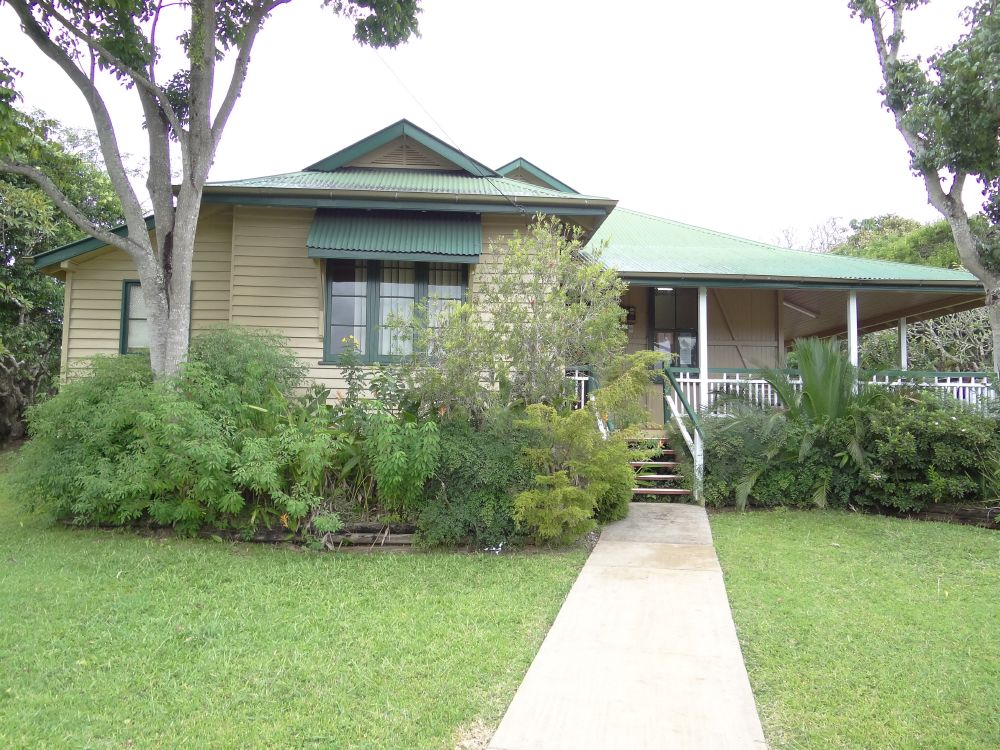
- Atherton State School Head Teacher's Residence, 2013

- Location within Queensland Location within Australia
- 17.2672°S 145.477°E
- Location: 42 Mable Street, Atherton, Tablelands Region, Queensland, Australia

History
- Design period: 1870s–1890s (late 19th century)
- Built: 1913

Site notes
- Architect: Queensland Department of Public Works

Queensland Heritage Register
- Official name: Head Teacher's Residence, Atherton State School (former), Atherton Provisional School, Enterprise House, Principal's Residence (former)
- Type: state heritage (built)
- Designated: 21 October 1992
- Reference no.: 600013
- Significant period: 1891–1985 (historical); 1890s–1900s (fabric)
- Significant components: residential accommodation – headmaster's house
- Builders: Queensland Department of Public Works

Atherton State School Head Teacher's Residence is a heritage-listed school residence at 42 Mable Street, Atherton, Tablelands Region, Queensland, Australia. It was designed and built by the Queensland Department of Public Works in 1913. It is also known as Atherton Provisional School, Enterprise House, and former Principal's Residence. It was added to the Queensland Heritage Register on 21 October 1992.

== History ==
The former Atherton State School Head Teacher's Residence was built in 1913 to accommodate the large family of the school's head teacher at the time, Joseph Johnson. Its design was the product of the Queensland Department of Public Works under the leadership of notable architect Thomas Pye. Atherton is located in Far North Queensland about 50 kilometres (31 mi) south-west of Cairns. It is one of the principal towns of the highland area known as the Atherton Tablelands, the main industries of which are agriculture, dairying and tourism. After the school was relocated in the mid-1980s, the land on which the residence and school buildings stand became a local government reserve and the site has been available for community purposes since 2009.

In 1880 tin was discovered at the site of Herberton, on the present day Atherton Tablelands, bringing Europeans into the area including a number of timber-getting teams seeking valuable cedar. They established small camps including one named Prior's Pocket. In 1883 agricultural blocks were opened for selection in the area and requests were made for a survey of Prior's Pocket to allow the establishment of a township. This was surveyed in 1885 and renamed Atherton. The first land sale took place on 23 February 1886, when 84 town lots were sold. Atherton was on the path of the railway being constructed from Cairns and by 1888 it was seen as a future terminus for agricultural produce and timber. The town developed rapidly and the need for a school was soon felt.

Colonial governments played an important role in the provision of formal education. In 1848 the New South Wales Government established National Schools. This was continued by the Queensland Government after the colony's separation in 1859. The Education Act 1860 established the Queensland Board of General Education and began to standardise curriculum, teacher training, and facilities. The Education Act 1875 provided a number of key initiatives for primary education; it was to be free, compulsory and secular. The Department of Public Instruction was established to administer the Act. This move standardised the provision of education and, despite difficulties, colonial educators achieved a remarkable feat in bringing basic literacy to most Queensland children by 1900.

The provision of schools to provide formal education to Queensland children was considered an essential step in the development of early communities; integral to the success of a town, the colony, and the nation. Land and construction labour was often donated by the local people and schools frequently became a major focus within the community as a place symbolising progress, for social interaction, and a source of pride. Also, the maintenance of schools frequently involved contributions of time and effort from teachers, parents, and pupils.

Provisional schools were introduced in 1869 to provide education to communities with small, scattered student populations and limited financial capacity, and were often constructed on rail lines or in mining areas. If there were between 15 and 30 pupils, and the community could provide a school building, the government would provide a teacher and equipment.

In 1890 a school committee was formed at Atherton and an application made for a provisional school to meet the needs of the growing community. The Committee raised £65 for the school, which was constructed as a simple two-room timber building and opened in 1891 on a site at the corner of Mabel and Vernon streets. The school suffered a setback in 1895 when the teacher resigned. It was closed, and the children sent to school at Carrington until a new teacher was appointed and the school reopened in 1896.

Although the progress of the railway took longer than initially expected, when it arrived at Atherton in 1903 it brought prosperity and more families to the township. By 1904 the Atherton Provisional School was the biggest in the state by a considerable margin, far exceeding the minimum numbers required for the establishment of a state school, and its status was upgraded. A new school building was completed next to the provisional school in 1906 and the old building was extended and adapted as a residence for the head teacher. The state school formally opened in 1906 with Richard Hooper as head teacher.

By this period, the Atherton Tablelands had become the main maize growing area in Far North Queensland and this was the chief agricultural pursuit around Atherton. Chinese tenant farmers dominated the industry, and a sizeable Chinatown developed. Although dairying in the Tablelands was not a significant industry until World War II, the industry showed some early promise with establishment of the Golden Grove Butter Factory built just north of Atherton in 1909. In 1913 it had 110 registered suppliers.

Atherton had 1186 residents when Joseph Johnson commenced as head teacher at the school in 1911, and moved into the old residence with his wife and seven children. One of his sons, Joseph Jacques Johnson, was also employed as a pupil teacher.

It soon became evident that the residence was inadequate for the Johnson family. In August 1911, Johnson wrote to the Under-secretary for Public Instruction complaining that it was too small and uncomfortable and its condition was so deteriorated that one of his sons had fallen through a floorboard. In September, the Works Department's Inspector of Works for the Northern District confirmed the poor state of the building and recommended a new residence be constructed. The following month, the family moved to a rented property and in 1912 the old residence was sold and removed from the site.

As in other Australian colonies, the Queensland Government developed standard plans for its school buildings, which helped to ensure consistency and economy. The standard designs were continually refined by government architects in response to changing needs and educational philosophy. Until the 1960s school buildings were predominantly timber-framed, taking advantage of the material's abundance in the state and the high number of builders skilled in its use. This also allowed for easy and economical construction and enabled the government to provide facilities in remote areas. Due to the standardisation of facilities, schools across the state were developed in distinctly similar ways and became complexes of typical components.

Design and construction of school buildings was the responsibility of the Department of Public Works from 1893. Its staff refined the Department of Public Instruction's existing practice of using standard plans and documentation to eliminate the expense of preparing site- specific documents for every school. In 1909, new standard designs for school residences were developed by the department in response to persistent criticism of the old designs by the School Inspectors. One inspector commented in 1904: "I believe this want of comfort in the matter of residences to be one of the causes why teachers are so reluctant to accept schools in the Western parts of the State". In order to make the residences more comfortable, the verandas were enlarged, and, in larger residences, a rear veranda was designed to be used for dining or as a sleep-out.

The design of the head teacher's residence at Atherton differed considerably from the standard designs. As well as being quite different in room layout, the ten-roomed timber and corrugated iron house was larger. It had four bedrooms, a sitting room and a dining room whereas the largest of the standard designs from the period could have up to four bedrooms but only by converting the sitting room to a bedroom. Why the house was made larger than normal may have simply been due to the size of the family it had to accommodate, or that it accommodated a pupil teacher as well as the head teacher. Nevertheless, its design was consistent with the resolve to improve the comfort of teacher residences that had motivated the development of the 1909 standard plans.

Tenders were called for the new residence in March 1913 and the following month the £670 tender of H Boyle was accepted. Following its completion, the Johnson family moved in on 25 October 1913.

The Department of Public Works at the time of construction of the former residence was led by Alfred Barton Brady, the Queensland Government Architect. In 1912, the Works department had a team of 21 draftsmen and one draftswoman under the supervision of the highly competent Thomas Pye as Deputy Government Architect. During the early 20th century, this team produced a substantial body of high quality work including the Land Administration Building, the former Queensland Government Savings Bank (later the Family Services Building), the George Street additions to the former Government Printing Office, Block A of the Rockhampton Technical College (1914) and Windsor State School (1915 to 1916). Many of the finest public buildings in Queensland were designed at this time.

Of the school residences built between 1893 and 1914, 19 are extant, and of these, 16 were built to a standard design. After 1914, the standard designs changed and in the late 1920s two types were introduced that resembled the residence at Atherton in form and plan arrangement. The earlier standard residences (1893–1914) were low-set with simple hipped roofs, featuring a verandah along the front of the house with rooms stacked behind. To increase the capacity of these houses, a verandah was added at the rear. Later designs (those used after 1914) featured hip-and-gable roofs and were high-set. The overall form of the residence at Atherton and its plan arrangement are similar to the post-1914 types, but is low-set like the earlier types.

Johnson remained at the school until his death, aged 66, in the Atherton Hospital on 6 November 1930. Mr AJ Beck replaced him as head teacher in December that year (formerly of Dallarnil State School). The following year the Atherton State School became a Rural School and provided manual training and domestic science classes. A new head teacher, Mr Gilchrist, formerly of Silkwood State School, was appointed in 1934. The school continued to expand with the addition, in 1951, of the first wing of a new school building to accommodate a High Top. This was progressively expanded until 1963, even after the opening of the new state high school at its present site in 1959.

In 1984 a new State Primary School was opened and grades 5 to 7 moved to the new school site in Armstrong Street. In 1985 grades 1 to 4 followed them and the Mabel Street primary school was closed. The National Trust of Queensland entered the residence in its register in that year.

The land occupied by the school was gazetted as a reserve for Local Government purposes in 1988 and responsibility for the buildings passed to the Atherton Shire Council. The former head teacher's residence became Enterprise House in 1997 and accommodated various government offices including one for the Department of Primary Industries. A deed of grant of the land was made to the Tablelands Regional Council in 2009.

The former residence at Atherton remains substantially intact in 2013. It has been restumped with steel columns and the veranda on the north- eastern side of the house has been enclosed to make two rooms. A doorway from this enclosed veranda into the bedroom facing Mabel Street (north-west) was closed and a doorway into the former dining room moved towards the west. The former pantry was remodelled into a toilet and a nearby doorway into an adjacent bedroom closed. Access into this room is now provided via a new doorway directly into the kitchen, whose stove recess has been removed and replaced with a bank of windows looking over the rear yard. The former bathroom has been opened into the adjacent kitchen and the former washroom at the rear was partitioned to form a store and exit lobby. A ramp has replaced stairs leading off the rear of the south-western verandah.

== Description ==
The former Head Teacher's Residence is located next to the former Atherton State Primary School on part of a 2.515 hectares (6.21 acres) allotment (2NR7968) at the corner of Mabel and Vernon streets near to the centre of town. It is a single-storey, timber-framed and weatherboard-clad building set on steel, square-section posts supported on pad footings. It has a complex hipped roof with ventilated gablets and clad in corrugated metal sheeting.

In plan the building comprises a core of rooms with an L-shaped verandah on its south-west side, an enclosed verandah on its north- east side and a small wing projecting off the rear corner.

The north-western elevation to Mabel Street is the building's front and composed of the side of the enclosed verandah with a window, a central bay with gabled roof and a tripartite window arrangement of three casements and the broad, open verandah. The three-part window has a timber-bracketed, metal sheeting-clad hood. The verandah has stop-chamfered timber posts and dowel balustrading with solid top rail, while its ceiling is lined with tongue-and-groove boards. A series of French doors open onto the verandah. The north-eastern elevation features a gablet towards the rear under which are two double-hung sash windows, and the enclosed verandah with a series of casements and a timber double door at the top of the access stair here (timber).

The open verandah runs along the south-western side of the building, with a roof ridge running parallel to the verandah length and finished with gablets at each end. Over the verandah the roof is broken-backed. The walls to the verandah are single skin. On the south-eastern elevation there is a recent ramp leading off the end of the verandah (replacing timber stairs no longer extant). A small room projects off the north-eastern corner and has a separate skillion roof and stands on a concrete slab-on-ground. Its north-eastern and north-western walls are clad in corrugated metal sheeting (where mesh had been originally). A single door opens onto the back yard.

Public access to the former residence is via a gate in the chain-wire fence on Mabel Street, along a concrete path, up a short flight of timber stairs leading to the open verandah and through a wide door with glazed panes. Through the front door is a short hall. Three rooms stand on the south-western side against the verandah, while a further two stand along the north-eastern side. The central room has been made a reception with insertion of a counter. Beyond the latter to the north a verandah has been enclosed as two small rooms, the single- skin, once-exterior wall still visible. At the rear, north-eastern corner are three small rooms leading into a kitchen.

The main rooms of the residence are predominately lined with vertical tongue-and-groove boards on the walls and ceilings. There are also simple timber strip cornices and skirtings throughout. Similarly, the main rooms have polished timber floors with carpet laid over some areas. The walls of the three small rooms at the rear, the last of which is reached via a short flight of timber stairs, are lined with flat sheets. There are linoleum squares on the floor in this area leading into the kitchen, with timber boards likely underneath, except in the former laundry which stands of a small slab that is finished with paint.

The early doors are four-panelled and have glazed fanlights above. The French doors are low-waisted with two large lights each side divided in two by a mullion. They also have glazed fanlights above. There are a number of double-hung windows throughout with two lights, each divided in two. A number of double casements are used in the enclosed verandah. A secondary entrance here comprises a short flight of timber stairs. A French door opens at the top of these stairs and on either side are fixed, four-paned windows. Most doors and windows have original hardware.

The yard of the former residence is grassed and fenced, with a few trees lining the perimeter in the north-eastern and south-eastern corners. There is a very gentle slope from Mabel Street toward the east. A concrete retaining wall about half a metre high follows the Mabel Street alignment, with short stair in the centre. It turns the corner along part of the Vernon Street alignment.

There is a skillion-roofed garage in the south-eastern part of the yard facing Vernon Street. It is clad in profiled sheeting, stands on a slab and has large double timber doors.

== Heritage listing ==
The Head Teacher's Residence of the former Atherton State School was listed on the Queensland Heritage Register on 21 October 1992 having satisfied the following criteria.

The place is important in demonstrating the evolution or pattern of Queensland's history.

Completed in 1913 and unusual in being built to a non-standard design, the former Head Teacher's Residence, Atherton State School, is important in demonstrating the prominence of Atherton as a regional centre in northern Queensland, particularly in the first part of the 20th century.

The size of the residence and the amenity it provided to the head teachers who occupied it - characteristics that can still be read in the building 100 years after its construction - also exemplify the Queensland Department of Public Works' policy from 1909 of improving the comfort of these types of residences to encourage teachers to remain in their positions in regional schools.

The place demonstrates rare, uncommon or endangered aspects of Queensland's cultural heritage.

The former Head Teacher's Residence at Atherton is important as a rare example of one that followed a non-standard design by the Queensland Department of Public Works. There were 19 extant school residences built 1893 and 1914, and only three of these follow a non-standard design.

The place is important in demonstrating the principal characteristics of a particular class of cultural places.

Highly intact in terms of the important characteristics of this class of cultural place-namely the internal layout of its rooms, fabric and setting-the former Atherton head teacher's residence is a fine example of a purpose-built school residence designed by the architectural office of Queensland's Department of Public Works.
