= Accordent Technologies =

Defunct American presentation software company

- Type: Privately held company
- Industry: Software
- Founded: 1999
- Defunct: 2011
- Fate: Acquired
- Successor: Polycom
- Headquarters: El Segundo, CA, United States
- Area served: Worldwide
- Products: Media Management System (Media Management), Capture Station (Lecture Capture), PresenterPro, PresenterPlus, Engage
- Website: accordent.com at the Wayback Machine (archived September 27, 2007)

Accordent Technologies was an American company that produces software for streaming media creation and management. It was acquired by Polycom in 2011.

Prior to its acquisition it was headquartered in El Segundo, California and had sales and development offices in Seattle, London, New York City, Atlanta, Dallas and Austin. Accordent pioneered software for creating presentations that synchronize streaming video with PowerPoint slides.

== History ==
The company was founded in 1999 in El Segundo, California. It specializes in synchronizing PowerPoint slides with streaming video, offering products like Media Management System, Capture Station, PresenterPro/Plus, and Engage.

It grew to over 50 employees, with 2007 revenues surpassing $11 million and serving over 1,500 clients, including 150 Fortune 500 companies, 450+ educational institutions, and 125 public-sector organizations.

Accordent was acquired by Polycom in 2011 for $50 million.

== Products ==
The Accordent product line included multimedia management software that enabled clients to manage, search, and secure online multimedia presentations created with Accordent presentation products, as well as archived versions of content from third-party sources, such as archived versions of videoconferences from Tandberg and other manufacturers, web conferences, and standalone videos.

== Competitive environment ==
During the period that Accordent operated, the market for online content management grew, and the company faced a number of competitors. Key players in this industry vertical were companies like Granicus, which focused on Government webcasts by delivering session notes, meeting agendas, interactive voting, and live interactive webcasts designed to bring government to the public. Other companies that competed against Accordent Technologies were those that utilized the same underlying technologies, such as Sonic Foundry's MediaSite, a webcasting tool that had video plus interactive content similar to Accordent presentations. As the market for webcasting increased, other recognized leaders in the industry, such as Adobe, Echo360, Presentations2Go, Webex, and others vied for market share.

In the content management system market, derived from the need to organize and store created presentations, long-standing players such as Oracle, Microsoft's SharePoint, and The Platform had a large market share. Smaller open source content management systems such as Joomla, Moodle, and Angel also increased market presence due to their low cost and accessibility to the education market. In this market, more colleges and universities were increasing their online presence, called a Virtual Campus, also known as Learning Management Systems. In this Virtual Campus setting, some notable Learning Management Systems such as Sakai, Blackboard, Desire2Learn all compete directly with Accordent Technologies Media Management System to manage classroom content, testing, and student coursework.
