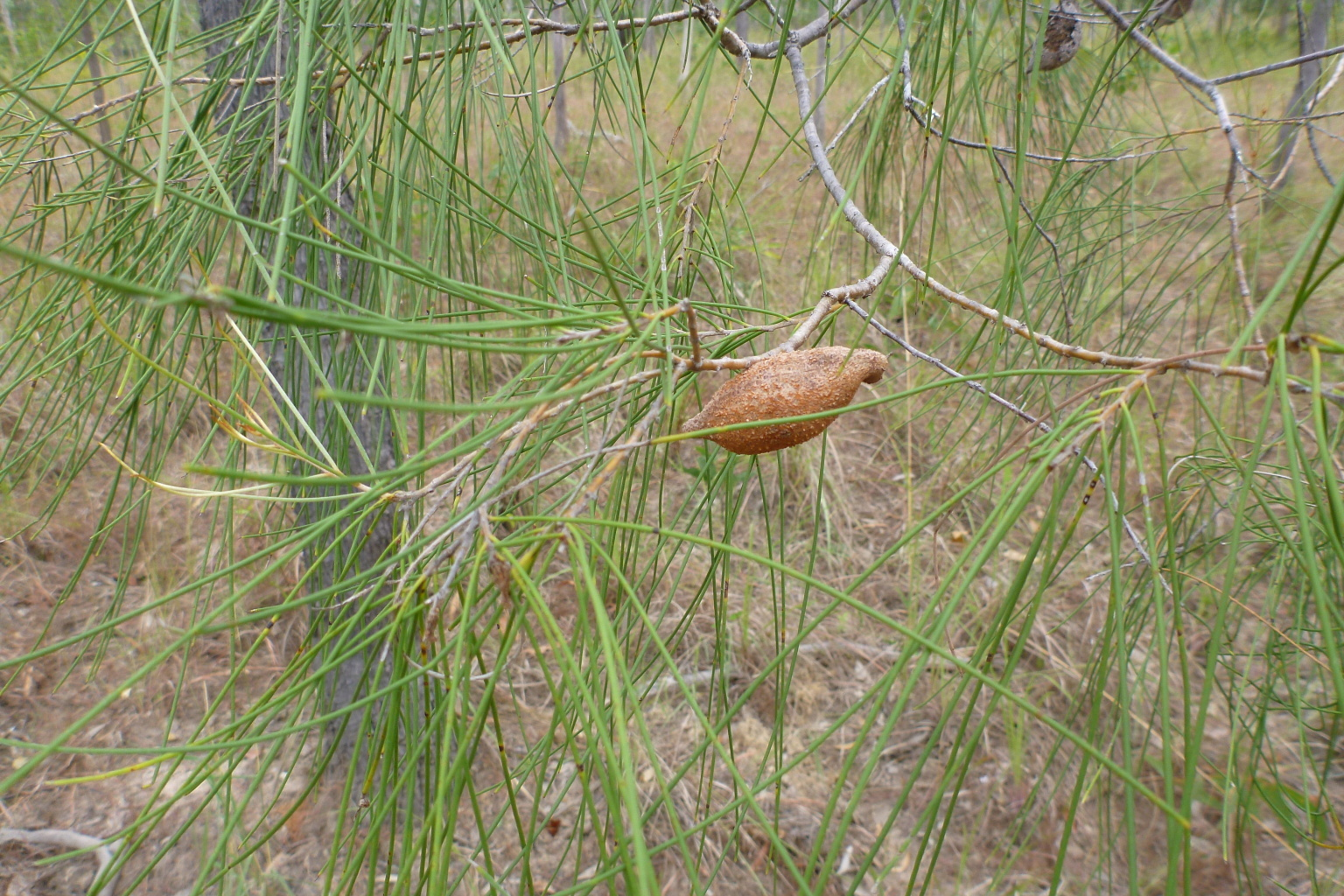

Scientific classification
- Kingdom: Plantae
- Clade: Tracheophytes
- Clade: Angiosperms
- Clade: Eudicots
- Order: Proteales
- Family: Proteaceae
- Genus: Hakea
- Species: H. persiehana

Binomial name
- Hakea persiehana F.Muell.
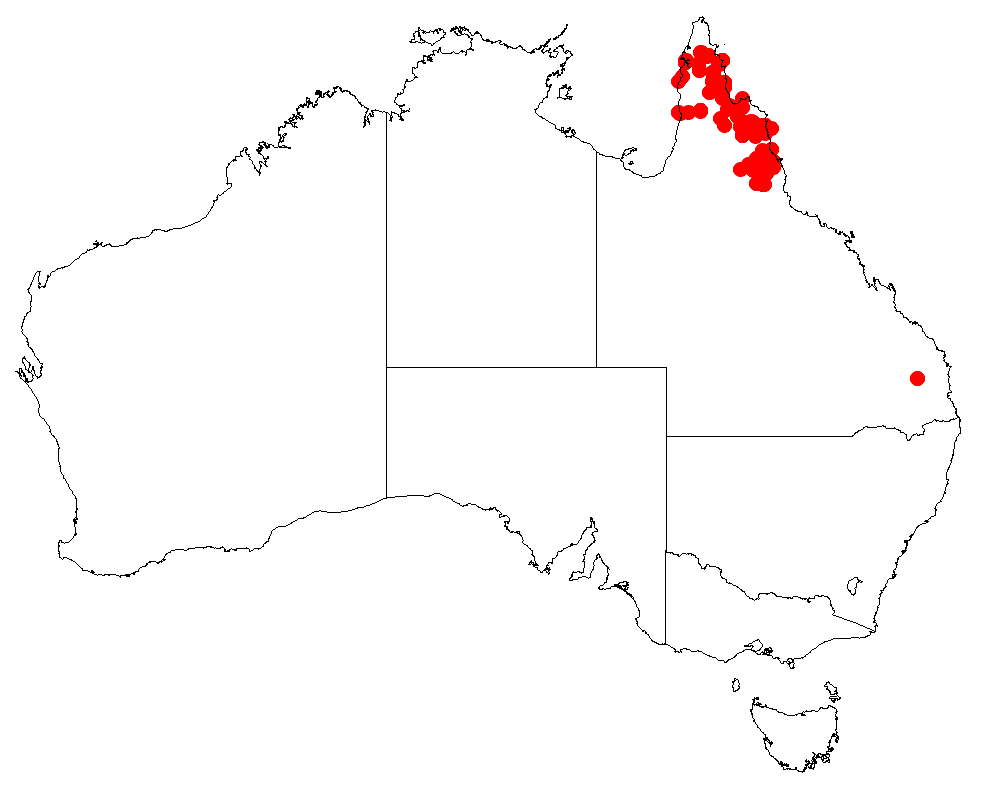
- Occurrence data from AVH

= Hakea persiehana =

Species of plant endemic to Queensland, Australia

Hakea persiehana is a shrub or small tree in the genus Hakea, which comprises approximately 150 species restricted to Australia. Most Hakea seed are usually dispersed by an environmental trigger rather than when seed matures, quite often by fire, whilst other species may require sporadic flooding rains to establish. Hakea is within the family Proteaceae

== Description ==
Hakea persiehana is a shrub or small tree growing 3 to 10 m (10 to 33 ft) in height with a spreading canopy and dark grey deeply grooved cork-like bark. Terete leaves are 8 to 28 centimetres (3 to 10 in) long and 0.7–1 millimetre (0.03–0.04 in) wide. About 50–100 cream-white flowers per inflorescence appear between November and February, occasionally May to June. The fruit is obliquely egg-shaped, 4.5–5.5 cm (1.8–2.2 in) long and 2–2.7 cm (0.8–1 in) wide, and gradually tapers into a recurved beak about 1–2 mm (0.04–0.08 in) long.

== Taxonomy and naming ==
Hakea persiehana was first formally described by Ferdinand von Mueller in 1886 and published in the Australasian Journal of Pharmacy. The species was named after druggist W. Anthony Persieh, a prolific collector for Mueller of Queensland flora.

== Distribution and habitat ==
Hakea persiehana grows on Cape York Peninsula a large peninsula in far North Queensland as far south as the Atherton. Occurs in open woodland usually with Eucalyptus and Melaleuca.

== Conservation status ==
Hakea persiehana is considered "least concern" by the Department of Environment and Science, Queensland.
