= Jubilee College =

Jubilee College may refer to:

- Jubilee College (Illinois), a former private college in Peoria County, Illinois, United States
- Jubilee Christian College, in Atherton, Queensland, Australia
- Jubilee Mission Medical College and Research Institute, in Kerala, India
- Jubilee College, at the Jockey Club Campus of the Open University of Hong Kong
- Jubilee College of Music, at Olivet University in Anza, California
