= Ren Pedersen =

Australian advocate

Ren Michael Pedersen OAM (born "Rene" in Atherton, North Queensland, Australia) is an advocate for children's brain cancer research. He founded the independent Australian arm of The Cure Starts Now after the death of his daughter Amy from a brain stem cancer known as Diffuse Intrinsic Pontine Glioma (DIPG). Pedersen was awarded an Order of Australia Medal in the 2022 Australia Day Honours for service to the community.

== The Cure Starts Now (Australia) ==
The Cure Starts Now was founded in 2007 by Cincinnati's Keith and Brooke Desserich with Pedersen the former director of the independent Australian branch of the organization. In 2009, the organization became an official DGR Registered Australian charity (Incorporation #IA37656) and then in 2019 a new charity name The Cure Starts Now Australia Limited was registered as a charity.

In 2013 the organisation was awarded a $109,000 Monash Institute of Medical Research Grant to fund "Targeted Drug and Stem Cell Therapy" trials and was featured at the International Symposium on Pediatric Neuro-Oncology in Singapore in 2014.

=== Fundraising for cancer research ===
To date approximately $5 million has been directly raised by The Cure Starts Now (Australia) for DIPG brain tumour research, since its 2009 inception

Significant fundraising activities include:

- In 2015, Pedersen helped raise nearly AU$190,000 for the Children's Cancer Institute of Australia,
- October 2016 – $180,000 provided to CCIA through the "DCA" Grant.
- November 2019 - The DIPG Collaborative presented a research grant cheque for $146,298.29 to Dr Han Shen at the Westmead Institute for Medical Research.
- December 2019 - The Cure Starts Now Australia donated $151,468 to Sydney Children's Hospital to develop new epigenetic combination treatments against DIPG.
- September 2020 - Hunter Institute of Medical Research's "COMBATT/Paxalisib" project commenced @ $203 522.00
- October 2020 - Children's Cancer Institute's "Epigenetic Players" initiative started @ $150 379.00
- February 2021 - Nature Communications announces new results from CSN's seed funding of the CCI's exciting DFMO/AMXT1501 research project.
- 15 April 2021 - new clinical trial announced, stemming from CSN's 2015 FACT/CBL0137 Grant.
- June 2021 - CSN Fundraising Gala.
- 6 October 2021 - $136,561.00 donated to Dr. Laura Genovesi for research into "Innovative Models of the Brain Microenvironment to Identify New Treatments for Medulloblastoma".
- 10 October 2021 - $266 741.00 donated to Dr. David Ziegler of Sydney Children's Hospital for research into "Phase I/II Study of Oral DFMO + AMXT1501 for DIPG/DMG".
- 10 October 2021 - $68 280.00 donated to Dr. Dannielle Upton of the Children's Cancer Institute for research into "Developing Novel Combination Therapies for DIPG".
