= Atherton War Memorial =

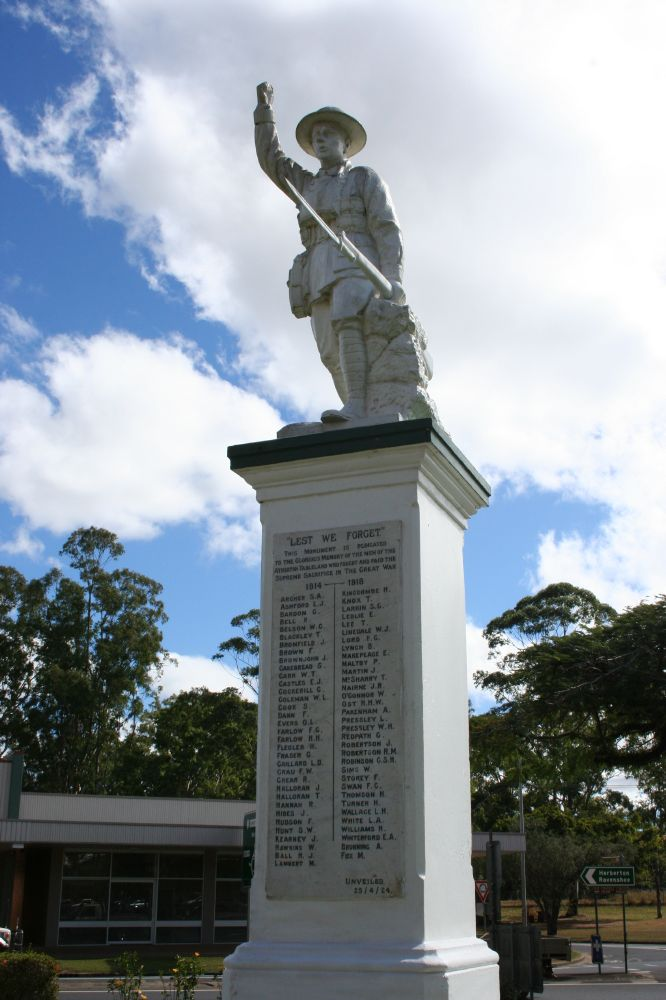
- Atherton War Memorial, 2011

- Location within Queensland
- 17.2627°S 145.4776°E
- Location: Kennedy Highway, Atherton, Tablelands Region, Queensland, Australia

History
- Design period: 1919–1930s (interwar period)
- Built: 1924

Queensland Heritage Register
- Official name: Atherton War Memorial
- Type: state heritage (built)
- Designated: 21 October 1992
- Reference no.: 600012
- Significant period: 1924–
- Significant components: memorial – soldier statue

Atherton War Memorial is a heritage-listed memorial at Kennedy Highway, Atherton, Tablelands Region, Queensland, Australia. It was built in 1924. It was added to the Queensland Heritage Register on 21 October 1992.

== History ==
The Atherton War Memorial was unveiled on 1 May 1924 by Chairman of the Tinaroo Shire, Mr Grau. It is thought to be designed and executed by Melrose and Fenwick, the leading monumental firm in north Queensland at the time. Funds for the memorial were raised mainly by the local women, with the Atherton RSL contributing £100. Excess patriotic funds allowed Atherton to expand its existing hospital into a larger war memorial hospital.

The stone memorial honours the 67 local fallen of the First World War. On Anzac Day, 1954, a plate was added to pay tribute to the 35 local fallen of the Second World War.

Initial attraction to the area of Atherton was due to the availability of timber, with a saw mill established in the early stages of development. The town was surveyed in 1885, several years after the discovery of tin in the tableland. Atherton became a large agricultural producer, providing much of the foodstuffs for the surrounding mining population. This was further enhanced by the arrival of the Chinese in the 1900s who continued to clear and cultivate the land for agricultural use. Major development occurred in 1903 and in the 1920s and 1930s and the town continued to be a base for the surrounding mining sites.

Australia, and Queensland in particular, had few civic monuments before the First World War. The memorials erected in its wake became our first national monuments, recording the impact of the war on a young nation. Australia lost 60,000 from a population of about 4 million, representing one in five of those who served. No previous or subsequent war has made such an impact on the nation.

Even before the end of the war, memorials became a spontaneous and highly visible expression of national grief. To those who erected them, they were as sacred as grave sites, substitute graves for the Australians whose bodies lay in battlefield cemeteries in Europe and the Middle East. British policy decreed that the Empire war dead were to be buried where they fell. The word "cenotaph", commonly applied to war memorials at the time, literally means "empty tomb".

Australian war memorials are distinctive in that they commemorate not only the dead. Australians were proud that their first great national army, unlike other belligerent armies, was composed entirely of volunteers, men worthy of honour whether or not they paid the supreme sacrifice. Many memorials honour all who served from a locality, not just the dead, providing valuable evidence of community involvement in the war. Such evidence is not readily obtainable from military records, or from state or national listings, where names are categorised alphabetically or by military unit.

Australian war memorials are also valuable evidence of imperial and national loyalties, at the time, not seen as conflicting; the skills of local stonemasons, metalworkers and architects; and of popular taste. In Queensland, the digger (soldier) statue was the popular choice of memorial, whereas the obelisk predominated in the southern states, possibly a reflection of Queensland's larger working-class population and a lesser involvement of architects.

Many of the First World War monuments have been updated to record local involvement in later conflicts, and some have fallen victim to unsympathetic re-location and repair.

Although there are many different types of memorials in Queensland, the digger statue is the most common. It was the most popular choice of communities responsible for erecting the memorials, embodying the ANZAC spirit and representing the qualities of the ideal Australian: loyalty, courage, youth, innocence and masculinity. The digger was a phenomenon peculiar to Queensland, perhaps due to the fact that other states had followed Britain's lead and established Advisory Boards made up of architects and artists, prior to the erection of war memorials. The digger statue was not highly regarded by artists and architects who were involved in the design of relatively few Queensland memorials.

Most statues were constructed by local masonry firms, although some were by artists or imported.

The statue at Atherton is unusual in that it portrays the digger in action. The monument suggests victory rather than reverence and mourning which is more familiar to Australian war memorials. Other details are also unique to this memorial such as the inclusion of a gas mask, a tin hat rather than a slouch hat and rocks as support instead of the ubiquitous tree stump. The digger originally carried a rifle with a fixed bayonet in his left hand.

The monument was formerly located in the town's main intersection of Main and Vernon Streets. However it was re-located two blocks north-east to the grounds of the RSL in the early 1980s. Despite this, it remains a significant landmark within the town.

== Description ==
The First World War Memorial is situated in one of the main intersections of Atherton facing the RSL building. It is located within a park setting and is complemented by a gun or "war trophy", a flagstaff, flower beds and poinciana trees.

The painted sandstone monument comprises a pedestal surmounted by a digger statue.

It sits on an octagonal base consisting of three smooth faced steps of the same height surmounted by a larger step, also smooth faced. Rising from this is a tall square pedestal capped by a large and simple cornice. The pedestal displays leaded marble plates on the front and rear faces. The front plate bears the names of the 67 men from the district who fell during the First World War and the plate at the rear bears the names of the 35 fallen from the Second World War.

The pedestal is surmounted by a digger statue in an animated pose. The figure is striding forward with the right arm raised. The remnants of a rifle (now missing) can be seen in the left hand. The figure is wearing a tin helmet and gas mask and is supported by a pile of rocks.

== Heritage listing ==
Atherton War Memorial was listed on the Queensland Heritage Register on 21 October 1992 having satisfied the following criteria.

The place is important in demonstrating the evolution or pattern of Queensland's history.

War Memorials are important in demonstrating the pattern of Queensland's history as they are representative of a recurrent theme that involved most communities throughout the state. They provide evidence of an era of widespread Australian patriotism and nationalism, particularly during and following the First World War. The monuments manifest a unique documentary record and are demonstrative of popular taste in the inter-war period.

The place demonstrates rare, uncommon or endangered aspects of Queensland's cultural heritage.

This memorial is unique as the only digger statue in Queensland in an animated pose.

The place is important in demonstrating the principal characteristics of a particular class of cultural places.

Erected in 1924, the memorial at Atherton demonstrates the principal characteristics of a commemorative structure erected as an enduring record of a major historical event. This is achieved through the use of appropriate materials and design elements. As a digger statue it is representative of the most popular form of memorial in Queensland.

The place is important because of its aesthetic significance.

It is of aesthetic significance both for its high degree of workmanship and design and as a dominant landmark within the town.

The place has a strong or special association with a particular community or cultural group for social, cultural or spiritual reasons.

The memorial has a strong association with the community as evidence of the impact of a major historic event.
