= Atherton, Queensland =

Atherton
- Town
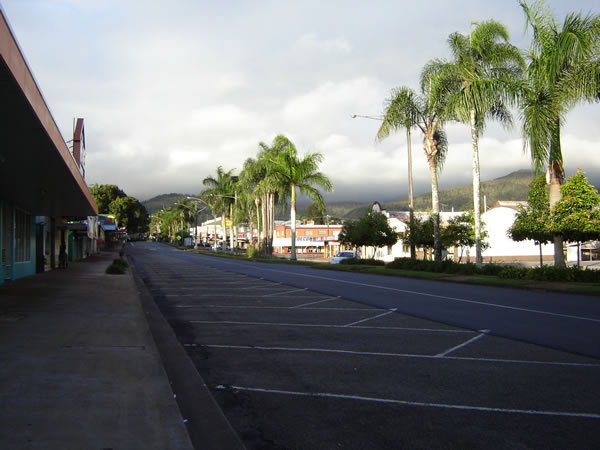
- The main street of Atherton

- Interactive map of Atherton
- Coordinates: 17.2658°S 145.4780°E
- Country: Australia
- State: Queensland
- LGA: Tablelands Region
- Location: 80 km (50 mi) SW of Cairns; 351 km (218 mi) NNW of Townsville; 1,703 km (1,058 mi) NNW of Brisbane

Government
  - State electorate: Hill
  - Federal division: Kennedy

Area
  - Total: 94.1 km^{2} (36.3 sq mi)
- Elevation: 752 m (2,467 ft)

Population
  - Total: 7,724 (2021 census)
  - Density: 82.08/km^{2} (212.59/sq mi)
- Time zone: UTC+10:00 (AEST)
- Postcode: 4883
- Mean max temp: 25.6 °C (78.1 °F)
- Mean min temp: 15.3 °C (59.5 °F)
- Annual rainfall: 1,387 mm (54.6 in)
Localities around Atherton
Watsonville	Tolga	Kairi
Watsonville	Atherton	East Barron
Carrington	Wongabel	East Barron

Atherton is a rural town and locality in the Tablelands Region, Queensland, Australia. In the 2021 census, the locality of Atherton had a population of 7,724 people.

== Geography ==
Atherton is on the Atherton Tableland in Far North Queensland.

Atherton is joined by the Gillies Highway to Yungaburra, the Kennedy Highway north to Mareeba and south to Ravenshoe and Mount Garnet, the Malanda–Atherton Road to Malanda and the Atherton–Herberton Road to Herberton.

== History ==
Yidinji (also known as Yidinj, Yidiny, and Idindji) is an Australian Aboriginal language. Its traditional language region is within the local government areas of Cairns Region and Tablelands Region, in such localities as Cairns, Gordonvale, and the Mulgrave River, and the southern part of the Atherton Tableland including Atherton and Kairi.

The town was named after John Atherton, a pioneer pastoralist who settled at Mareeba (then known as Emerald End) in 1875. The area was formerly known as Priors Pocket or Priors Creek. It was named Atherton by Falconer West Hutton, the surveyor who prepared the town layout on 11 May 1885.

Atherton Provisional School opened on 2 March 1891 and closed in 1905. In 1906, it reopened as Atherton State School.

Atherton Pioneer Cemetery opened in 1897 and closed in 1927 when the Rockley Road Cemetery was opened.

Atherton Post Office opened by 1903 (a receiving office had been open since 1889).

Cairns Road State School opened on 18 July 1921 and closed in 1963. It was on Picnic Crossing Road South (approx 17.27449°S 145.52424°E).

St Joseph's School opened on 29 January 1923.

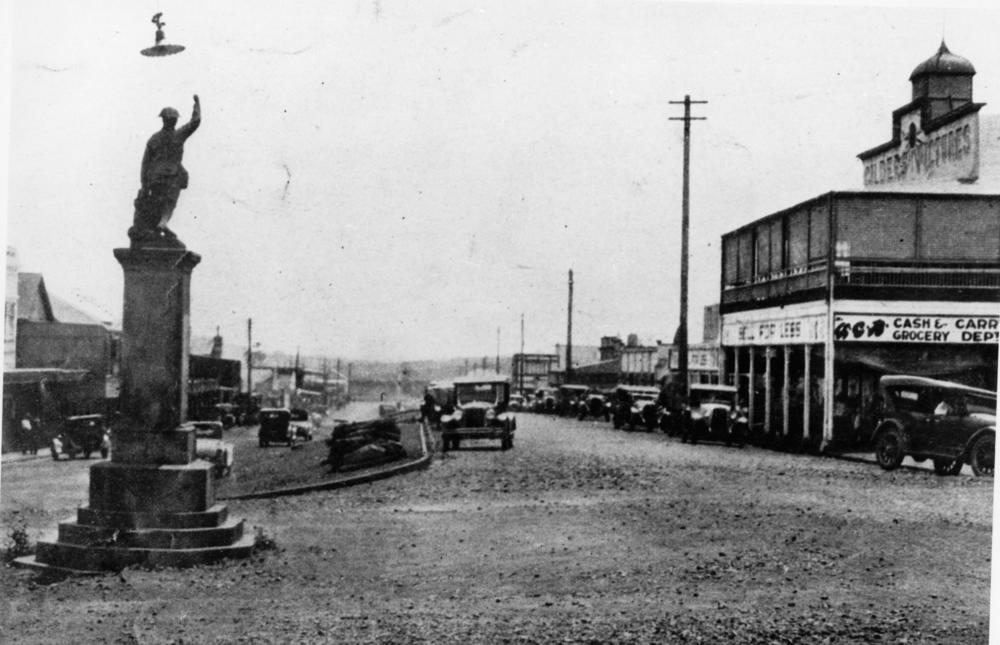
Atherton War Memorial in the main street, 1928

The Atherton War Memorial commemorates local residents who died in World War I. It was dedicated on 1 May 1924 by the Tinaroo Shire chairman, Frederick Grau. It is the only war memorial in Queensland of a digger in an animated pose, It was originally located in the middle of the street adjacent to where the ANZ bank is now located, but was later moved to the park outside the old Atherton RSL sometime after the 1950s.

The Atherton Courthouse was used as a wartime hospital for officers during World War II and has air raid bunkers beneath the building.

The Atherton Parish of the Roman Catholic Diocese of Cairns was established in 1949.

William John Bock was an early pioneer in Atherton. He made an audio recording discussing the early town, prior to his death on 19 February 1953 (aged 95).

Atherton State High School opened on 27 January 1959.

The Atherton Public Library was opened in 1978.

Jubilee Christian College opened on 1 July 1984.

== Demographics ==
In the 2011 census, the locality of Atherton had a population of 7,287 people.

In the 2016 census, the locality of Atherton had a population of 7,331 people.

In the 2021 census, the locality of Atherton had a population of 7,724 people.

== Economy ==
Due to its moderate climate, cooler and less humid than the tropical coast, and its booming agricultural industries, Atherton has a busy and prosperous community, and a vibrant social and cultural life. Atherton is very attractive to retirees and "tree changers" due to the cool climate, fertile garden soils, housing prices significantly lower than the nearby coastal city of Cairns, and the vibrant cultural life (live music, visual arts, theatre and sport).

The land around Atherton is used to grow a variety of crops, including coffee, sugar cane, tea, peanuts, mangoes, maize (corn), potatoes, avocados, blueberries, blackberries, strawberries and macadamia nuts. Dairy and beef cattle are also reared in the area.

== Culture ==
Each year towards the end of August, Atherton celebrates the Maize festival, which features a parade with decorated floats, the Maize Queen pageant, children's amusement rides and activities including tug of war and wood chopping. There are also shop window displays and artwork competitions, as well as a prize given to the best float.

The annual Atherton Agricultural Show is held in the second week of July at Atherton Show grounds including Heritage Listed Merriland Hall.

The Atherton Roosters field teams in the Cairns District Rugby League.

== Education ==
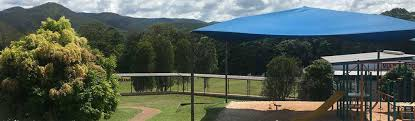
Atherton State School grounds, 2024

Atherton State School is a government primary (Prep–6) school for boys and girls at 28 Armstrong Street (17.2616°S 145.4816°E). In 2017, the school had an enrolment of 473 students with 45 teachers (37 full-time equivalent) and 35 non-teaching staff (22 full-time equivalent). It includes a special education program.

St Joseph's School is a Catholic primary (Prep–6) school for boys and girls at the corner of Jack & Alice Streets (17.26554°S 145.47864°E). In 2017, the school had an enrolment of 252 students with 19 teachers (16 full-time equivalent) and 14 non-teaching staff (8 full-time equivalent).

Jubilee Christian College is a private primary and secondary (Prep–12) school for boys and girls at 52 Grau Street (17.27494°S 145.47945°E). In 2017, the school had an enrolment of 908 students with 47 teachers (37 full-time equivalent) and 45 non-teaching staff (26 full-time equivalent).

Atherton State High School is a government secondary (7–12) school for boys and girls at Maunds Road (17.2600°S 145.4860°E). In 2017, the school had an enrolment of 780 students with 82 teachers (78 full-time equivalent) and 42 non-teaching staff (34 full-time equivalent). It includes a special education program. It also has a virtual campus called the School of Astronomy and Astrophysics.

Atherton has a technical and further education (TAFE) campus, the Tropical North Institute of TAFE. There are also two day care centres in the town.

== Amenities ==
The Tablelands Regional Council operates the Atherton Library on 16 Robert Street, Atherton. The library facility opened in 1978, with a major refurbishment in 2012.

The Atherton branch of the Queensland Country Women's Association meets at the CWA Hall on the corner of Jack Street and Arnott Lane (17.2648°S 145.4773°E)

St Joseph's Catholic Church is at 28 Mabel Street. It is within the Atherton Parish of the Roman Catholic Diocese of Cairns.

Atherton Uniting Church is on the corner of Jack Street and Victoria Street (17.2666°S 145.4808°E).

== Health ==
Atherton Hospital is in the Tablelands Health District. The hospital provides obstetric, medical, surgical, operating theatre, accident and emergency services.

== Transport ==
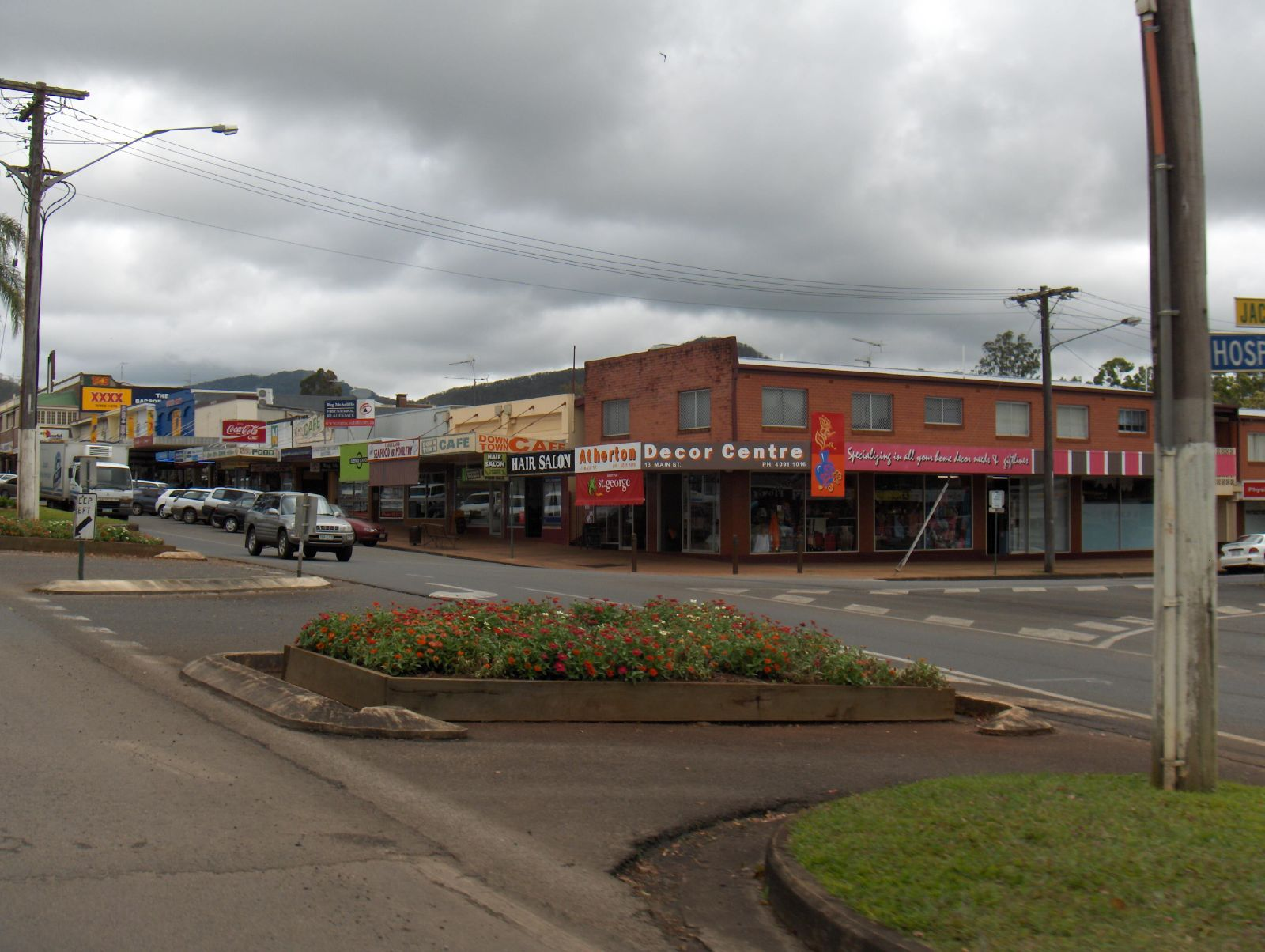
Atherton streets in 2006

Trans North offers a number of return bus services during a seven-day week between Atherton, Tolga, Walkamin, Mareeba, Kuranda, and Cairns including drop-offs to airport, railway station, hospitals and bus depots. There are connections available between Ravenshoe and Herberton and along the Wheelbarrow Way to Chillagoe. There is an Atherton taxi service.

== Heritage listings ==
Atherton has a number of heritage-listed sites, including:

- Herberton Road: Chinatown
- Herberton Road: Atherton Chinese Temple
- Kennedy Highway: Atherton War Memorial
- corner of Kennedy Highway and Rockley Road: Atherton War Cemetery
- 42 Mable Street: Atherton State School Head Teacher's Residence
- 53 Main Street: Barron Valley Hotel
- Mazlin Street: Merriland Hall
- 6 Silo Street: Atherton Performing Arts Theatre (World War II igloo)

== Notable residents ==
- Peter Beattie, who served as the 36th Premier of Queensland from 1998 to 2007
- Ron Grainer, composer, best known for composing the Doctor Who theme music
- Rod Jensen, former North Queensland Cowboys and Huddersfield Giants player
- Dallas Johnson, North Queensland Cowboys lock forward and former Melbourne Storm player and Queensland State of Origin representative
- Elizabeth O'Conner, author
- Ren Pedersen, children's brain cancer research advocate
- Alexander Prokhorov, Soviet/Russian physicist and Nobel Prize winner
- Roberto Venturato, football coach and former player

== Climate ==
Atherton has a warm humid subtropical climate (Köppen Cwa) that differs from the surrounding tropical savannah climate due to the town's elevation, high on the Atherton Plateau, 752 metres (2,467 ft) above sea level. Temperature extremes have ranged from 36.7 to −0.6 °C (98.1 to 30.9 °F). The average annual rainfall is 1,379.8 millimetres (54.32 in). The town is amongst the most northerly locations in Australia to record frost.

Climate data for Atherton (1992–2009)
Month	Jan	Feb	Mar	Apr	May	Jun	Jul	Aug	Sep	Oct	Nov	Dec	Year
Record high °C (°F)	36.0 (96.8)	33.5 (92.3)	32.6 (90.7)	31.1 (88.0)	29.0 (84.2)	30.0 (86.0)	30.3 (86.5)	30.0 (86.0)	34.9 (94.8)	36.7 (98.1)	36.6 (97.9)	36.4 (97.5)	36.7 (98.1)
Mean daily maximum °C (°F)	28.4 (83.1)	27.8 (82.0)	26.4 (79.5)	25.0 (77.0)	23.4 (74.1)	21.5 (70.7)	21.4 (70.5)	22.4 (72.3)	25.6 (78.1)	27.5 (81.5)	28.7 (83.7)	29.0 (84.2)	25.6 (78.1)
Mean daily minimum °C (°F)	18.8 (65.8)	19.3 (66.7)	18.3 (64.9)	16.7 (62.1)	14.0 (57.2)	12.8 (55.0)	10.2 (50.4)	11.1 (52.0)	12.6 (54.7)	15.2 (59.4)	16.7 (62.1)	18.3 (64.9)	15.3 (59.5)
Record low °C (°F)	8.2 (46.8)	13.8 (56.8)	11.0 (51.8)	8.4 (47.1)	3.0 (37.4)	−0.6 (30.9)	−0.5 (31.1)	1.7 (35.1)	3.0 (37.4)	6.0 (42.8)	7.9 (46.2)	8.0 (46.4)	−0.6 (30.9)
Average rainfall mm (inches)	235.5 (9.27)	347.7 (13.69)	224.7 (8.85)	118.7 (4.67)	59.6 (2.35)	42.0 (1.65)	40.0 (1.57)	34.5 (1.36)	19.2 (0.76)	35.2 (1.39)	72.0 (2.83)	150.7 (5.93)	1,379.8 (54.32)
Average rainy days (≥ 0.2mm)	19.8	20.6	17.4	20.8	16.6	16.1	12.5	11.9	8.3	9.4	11.0	15.5	179.9
Source: Bureau of Meteorology
