= Merriland Hall =

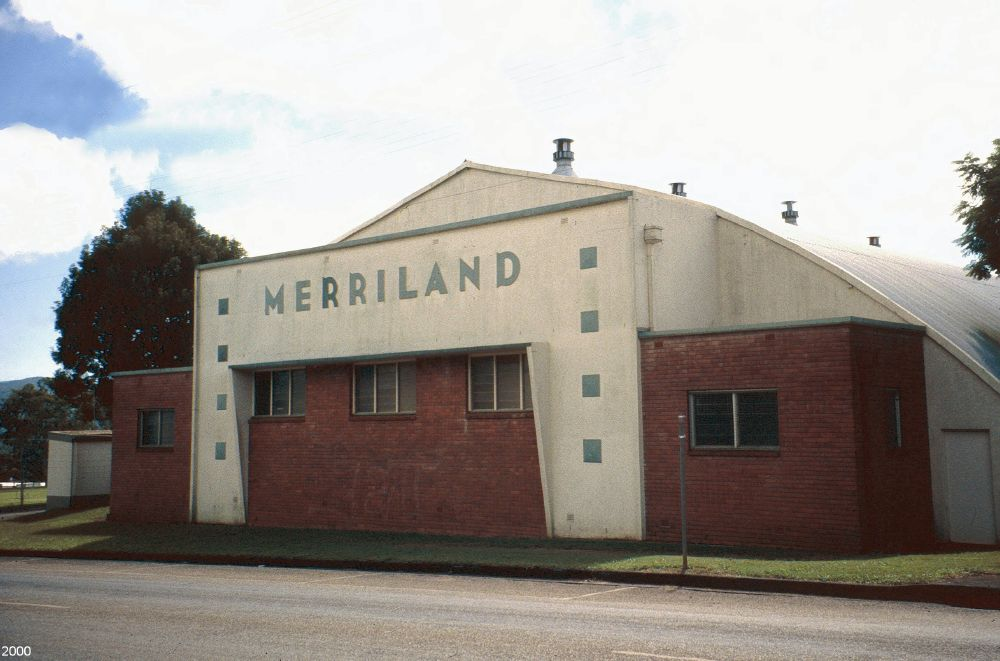
- Merriland Hall, street view, 2000

- Location within Queensland Location within Australia
- 17.2685°S 145.4826°E
- Location: Mazlin Street, Atherton, Tablelands Region, Queensland, Australia

History
- Design period: 1939–1945 (World War II)
- Built: November 1943

Queensland Heritage Register
- Official name: Merriland Hall, Former Atherton Camp Supply Depot
- Type: state heritage (built)
- Designated: 28 July 2000
- Reference no.: 602016
- Significant period: 1943 (fabric); 1943–1945 (historical); 1948–ongoing (social)
- Builders: Allied Works Council

Merriland Hall is a heritage-listed community hall at Mazlin Street, Atherton, Tablelands Region, Queensland, Australia. It was built in November 1943 by the Allied Works Council. It is also known as Former Atherton Camp Supply Depot. It was added to the Queensland Heritage Register on 28 July 2000.

== History ==
In November 1943 an Australian Defence Canteen was erected at the Atherton Showgrounds. Built for the Army by the Allied Works Council, with D. Prangley in charge and under the supervision of Raymond Clare Nowland, a government Senior Architect, it was a timber arched, unlined igloo structure, sheeted with corrugated iron. The structure was a component of one of the largest military store depots on the Atherton Tablelands. After the war the igloo was purchased by the Atherton Show Society and retained at the Showgrounds, becoming known as Merriland Hall.

Atherton became a town when it was surveyed in 1885, and named for John Atherton in 1886 when the first lots were put up for sale. It began as a timber town and once much of the timber had been felled, maize, originally grown by Chinese tenant farmers, became the important crop. Peanuts, also introduced by Chinese settlers, were an alternative crop to maize. Today dairying is its main industry. Prior to World War II Atherton was a quiet country town. However, by December 1942 the war had impinged upon the area quickly changing the landscape and the lives of the townspeople.

In 1942 the Tablelands Base Area was established, creating a constant flow of Army traffic through the town's main street, as camps were set up to train troops in jungle warfare before their being sent to the islands north of Australia. Many of Atherton's buildings housed both Australian and American forces. The School of Arts building was taken over by the Red Cross, and the Girl Guides hall by the Australian Army for use as its historical section, while the Sharples Theatre became an Army Canteen. Meanwhile, the Barron Valley Hotel was requisitioned by the Australian Army as an Officers Club and, for a short time, General Thomas Blamey made this his headquarters.

So much change occurred in Atherton during the war that it has been suggested that both the community and the economy could have been overwhelmed by the strain put upon it. But the reverse appears to have been true, as the one hundred thousand troops camped throughout the Tablelands area gave the residents the chance to become involved in the war effort by assisting and entertaining the visitors, while still keeping business running. Prosperity came with the influx and Atherton provided much timber towards war requirements. Maple was needed for aeroplane propellers and plywood for use in the manufacture of sea and air craft, while timber was also employed in the making of rifles, furniture and packing cases. Socially, the local people did much to entertain the forces and organised many dances, picture shows, concerts and outings as well as inviting the troops into their homes. In return, the soldiers helped in matters such as assisting to enlarge the Methodist Church, which was too small to accommodate their extra numbers.

In 1942 the Military took over the Atherton Showground and remained there for three years. In November 1943 a large igloo was erected for the Army by the Queensland Building and Engineering Co., under the auspices of the Allied Works Council. It was 200 by 100 feet (61 by 30 m) in size and built particularly to house the "Daily Issue Department", or Australian Defence canteen. A bakery, which daily supplied bread for all the forces in the area, was built on the western side of the show ring. The canteen igloo was constructed with a nailed hardwood timber arch construction, each arm made up of two half arches, pinned at two supports near the ground and at a central point. It formed an arch with timber bracing nailed into position to form a curved box truss. Although the original US design was intended to be covered with camouflage netting, the igloos built for Queensland were sheeted with iron. These changes, as made by the Allied Works Council, provided a stronger, more durable building which would be capable of withstanding winds of up to 65 miles per hour (105 km/h). The timber used in the igloos was hardwood or Oregon and the outer sheeting was corrugated iron.

The Allied Works Council, the builder of this and other wartime prefabricated buildings, was formed in February 1942 to co-ordinate and facilitate the needs of the Australian and US military forces in Australia during the war. The work carried out by the Allied Works Council included roads, camps, hospitals, ammunition depots, aerodromes, mess and recreation facilities, and gun emplacements. The Allied Works Council is significant because so much of their construction work transformed Australia, leaving a post-war legacy of roads and buildings still in use for peaceful pursuits.

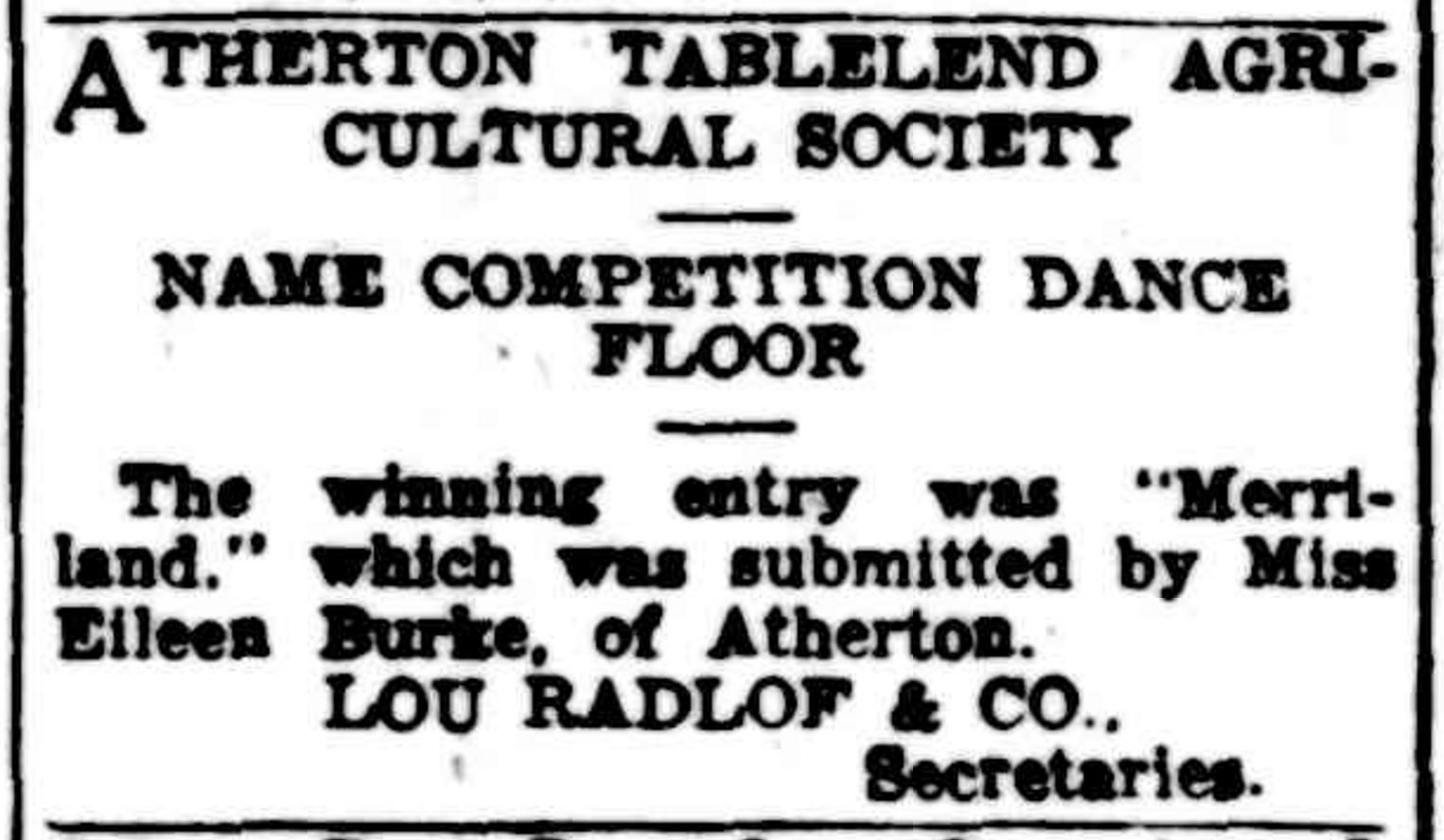
Announcement of "Merriland" as the winning name, Cairns Post, 21 July 1950, page 10

The Defence Canteen igloo was purchased by the Atherton Tableland Agricultural Society for a very low price after the war. When the Atherton Shire Hall, built in 1898, was destroyed by fire in 1948, the war-time igloo became a Community Centre. A committee was formed to manage the hall and they set about building a dance floor measuring 5,000 square feet with a further 2,000 square feet of galleries for seating. The £4,000 needed for this work was put up by the Atherton Shire Council, and money raised by the Atherton Choral Society and the Atherton Players. Both these groups put all their spare funds into improving the facilities, later adding chairs, stage lighting and dressing rooms. A contest was held to name the new Community Centre hall and Miss Eileen Burke won with the name "Merriland". In July 1951, the committee gave a Grand Ball to celebrate the opening with over 1,200 people in attendance. Merriland Hall went on to host most of the social and cultural occasions of Atherton for many years.

Among the entertainments held at Merriland Hall were concerts by the Queensland Symphony Orchestra and the Australian and Queensland Ballets as well as numerous shows by local and visiting amateur societies. From 1952 the Choral Society presented a variety concert or musical comedy every year when Princess Alexandra visited the area in 1959 most of the population of Atherton was able to gather in the hall to see the popular visitor. In 1958 a brick frontage and additions to the stage and dressing rooms were constructed at a cost of £400. In 1963 the Atherton Players produced more money and effort and repainted all the interior walls in preparation for the upcoming Drama Festival.

== Description ==
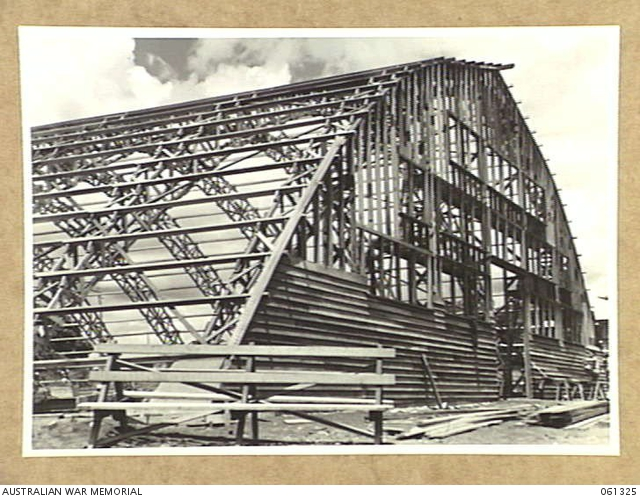
Australian Army canteen "igloo" under construction in Atherton, Queensland, 1943

Merriland is a large igloo situated within the Atherton Show Grounds and located at the corner of Robert and Mazlin Streets, Atherton. The name "igloo" was a Second World War slang shorthand term for any of a number of building forms with curved metal roofs. The igloo was designed as a camp supply depot, today it is composed of two major elements:

- an "igloo" of timber trusses clad in corrugated iron which forms the auditorium
- a brick frontage which forms part of the stage, backstage area and dressing rooms.

A separate building has been attached to the rear of the auditorium. This weatherboard building with a corrugated galvanised iron roof, is a cafeteria.

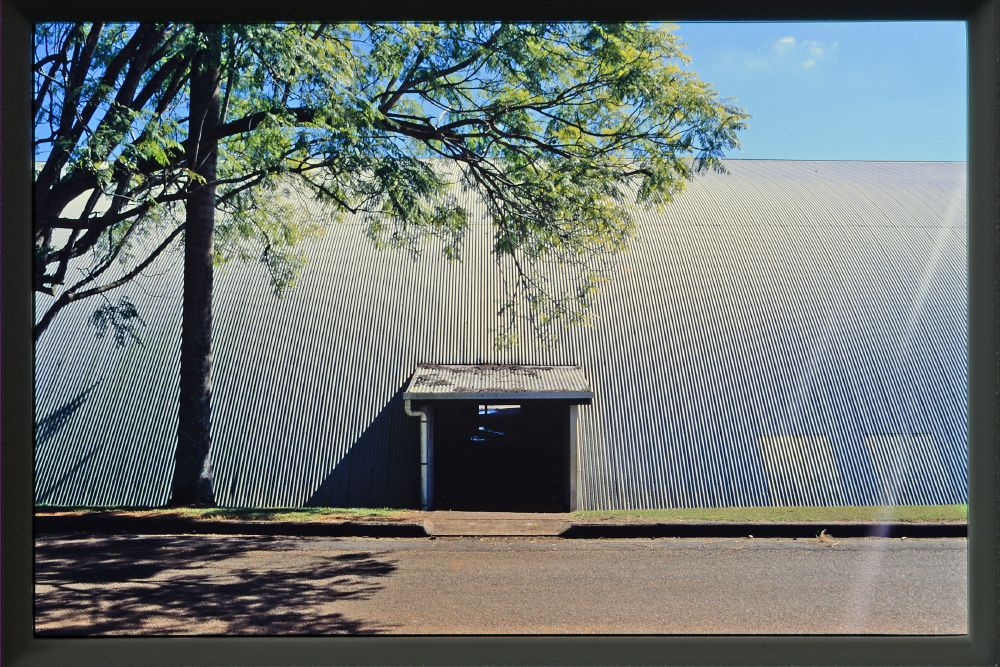
Side view of the igloo, 1998

The Merriland Hall is approximately 60 metres (200 ft) long and has an overall width of 30 metres (98 ft). The igloo stands on a concrete slab foundation with a raised kerb and two external drains running along the building's long sides, and cast concrete feet which support the trusses. There are sixteen trusses spanning the interior space. Each is composed of four curved half-trusses which are pinned at the foundations and at the apex where they meet. The two adjacent trusses are laced together at top and bottom chord level. Therefore, each half-truss consists of four timber chords sprung into arch form, with light timber bracing nailed into position to form a curved open-latticed box truss. The trusses are made entirely of sawn pieces of native hardwood nailed together.

Horizontal timber members run the full length of the auditorium on each half-truss. The roof structure is braced by a pattern of crossed diagonal timber struts running across the roof between the trusses. The centre section of the roof has been angled up into a low-pitched gable with rafters rising up from the upper chords of the trusses to meet a ridge beam running down the centreline of the igloo. Timber purlins running the length of the roof are nailed to these rafters and to the upper chords. The corrugated iron cladding is nailed directly to the purlins. There are four ventilators in the roof.

The interior of the auditorium has been divided into two spaces. The rear of the building is basically a clear space, it has been set up for indoor sports. An indoor basketball court has been marked out on the concrete floor and two backboards have been attached to trusses on either side of the igloo. One side of the auditorium has been modified to include both male and female toilets in a narrow concrete-block extension. A wire storage cage has been erected at the rear of the igloo. On the other side of the igloo, storage facilities have been provided in the form of timber lockers. In the centre of the rear wall are large double doors. Above the doors, and to either side, are a series of fixed glass windows.

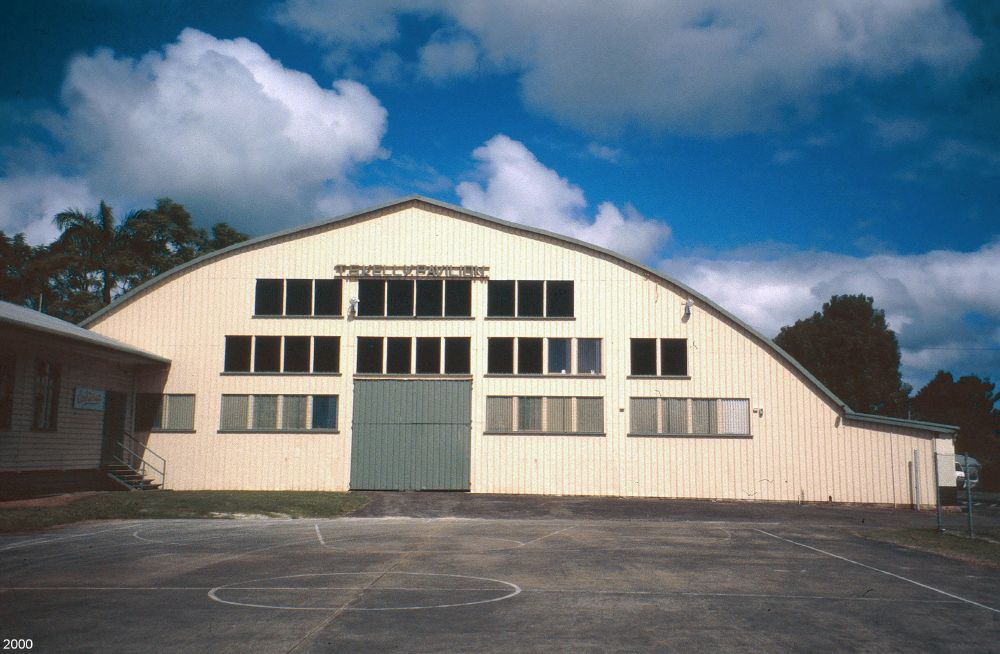
Rear of the building, 2000

A raised timber dance floor has been constructed in the front section of the building, with a stage and backstage area at one end. Dressing rooms and additional backstage space are housed in the 1958 brick frontage. Raised galleries, approximately 4 metres (13 ft) wide, have been constructed along either side of the dance floor for seating.

The cafeteria is housed in a rectangular timber-framed building with a gabled roof, which has been attached to the rear of the igloo. This symmetrical structure is raised off the ground on concrete stumps. It is externally clad in weatherboard and the internal walls are lined with fibro cement sheeting. Vinyl floor tiles line the timber floor. Six timber framed glass windows extend along either long wall. Exit doors are located on each side of the building. The internal area has been divided into two elements; a hall containing tables and chairs and a small kitchen situated in the rear of the building.

== Heritage listing ==
Merriland Hall was listed on the Queensland Heritage Register on 28 July 2000 having satisfied the following criteria.

The place is important in demonstrating the evolution or pattern of Queensland's history.

Merriland Hall is important in illustrating the evolution of Queensland's history because of the role it played in the provision of services to Australian and American army personnel who were training in north Queensland during World War II. It is the largest igloo to be erected on the Tablelands and is one of only a few large igloos constructed during this time that is still situated on its original site. Since this style of building was only used during the war, the construction is distinctive of a period of great significance to the Atherton area.

The place is important in demonstrating the principal characteristics of a particular class of cultural places.

Merriland Hall demonstrates the principal characteristics of this type of structure and represents a significant advancement in timber technology and construction achieved during the Second World War which enabled long span lightweight structures utilising hand nailed timber in small sectional chord sizes to be erected quickly and at low cost. It demonstrates the ability of the Allied Works Council to meet emergency demands for the construction of Allied defence works.

The place is important because of its aesthetic significance.

An impressive structure with a simple recognisable form, Merriland Hall is a local landmark. Adaptations made over time clearly reflect its change in use and contribute to its aesthetic and social value. Internally, the innovative timber structure is clearly expressed, and the expansive interiors contribute to the aesthetic significance of the structure.

The place is important in demonstrating a high degree of creative or technical achievement at a particular period.

Merriland Hall demonstrates the principal characteristics of this type of structure and represents a significant advancement in timber technology and construction achieved during the Second World War which enabled long span lightweight structures utilising hand nailed timber in small sectional chord sizes to be erected quickly and at low cost. It demonstrates the ability of the Allied Works Council to meet emergency demands for the construction of Allied defence works.

The place has a strong or special association with a particular community or cultural group for social, cultural or spiritual reasons.

Merriland Hall has a special association for the people of Atherton and district as it has been their community hall from 1948. It also has a strong association with the Allied Works Council whose works during the Second World War had a profound and enduring impact in the region.
