= Atherton Courthouse =

Courthouse in Queensland, Australia

Coordinates: 17°15′45″S 145°28′37″E

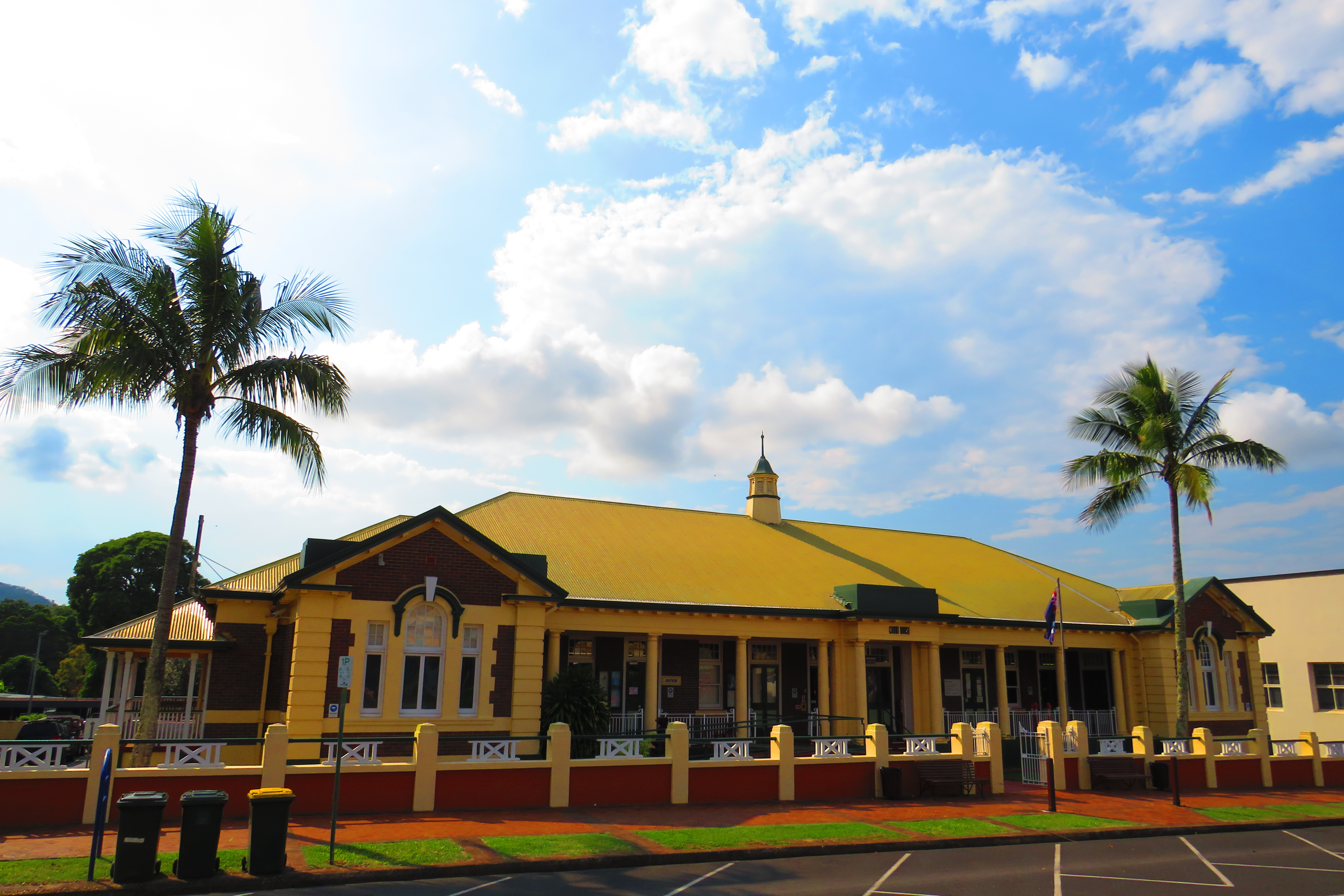

Atherton Courthouse is located at 81 Main Street, Atherton in Queensland, Australia.

The courthouse was built in 1941 and features timber panels constructed from rare quilted, Queensland rainforest maple, which is no longer milled in Australia.

The courthouse is still in use by the Atherton Magistrates Court.

== History ==
Atherton Courthouse was used as a wartime hospital for officers during World War II and has air raid bunkers beneath the building.
