= Jubilee Christian College =

Coordinates: 17°16′29″S 145°28′46″E

- Atherton, Queensland; Australia

Information
- Type: Independent
- Motto: Raising a Standard
- Established: 1984
- Principal: Chris Radcliff
- Enrolment: 650 (P–12)
- Campus: Atherton
- Colours: Navy blue & teal
- Website: www.jubileecc.qld.edu.au

Jubilee Christian College is an independent, co-educational, Christian school, located in Atherton, Queensland, Australia. It was founded in 1984.

== History ==
The school began its life as Tableland Christian College. It started with 13 students and one teacher in the building that now houses the Tableland-Johnston District Education Office of Education Queensland.

In 1990, the school commenced secondary education for students in Year 8 and 9. In 1992 Tableland Christian College became one of only a handful of non-state schools in Australia registered to provide Distance Education.

Towards the end of 1997, it was recognised that the school's future would be benefited by making the school ‘non-denominational’ – that is not controlled, or seen to be controlled, by any one particular church denomination. To that end, the parents and the staff of the school banded together to form a new company, Jubilee Christian College Ltd, with the vision to take over the operation of the school.

During the next few months the directors of Jubilee Christian College Ltd completed documentation that would see the new company be approved by both the State and Commonwealth Governments as the Approved Authority of the existing school, Tableland Christian College.

On May 1, 1998, the directors of Jubilee Christian College Ltd officially took control of the school known as Tableland Christian College. In order to demonstrate that the school was now separate from the Assembly of God church, the directors changed the name of the School to Jubilee Christian College.

The college currently enrols students from Prep to Year 12, for both on campus and distance education.

== See also ==
- List of schools in Queensland
