= Chinatown, Atherton =

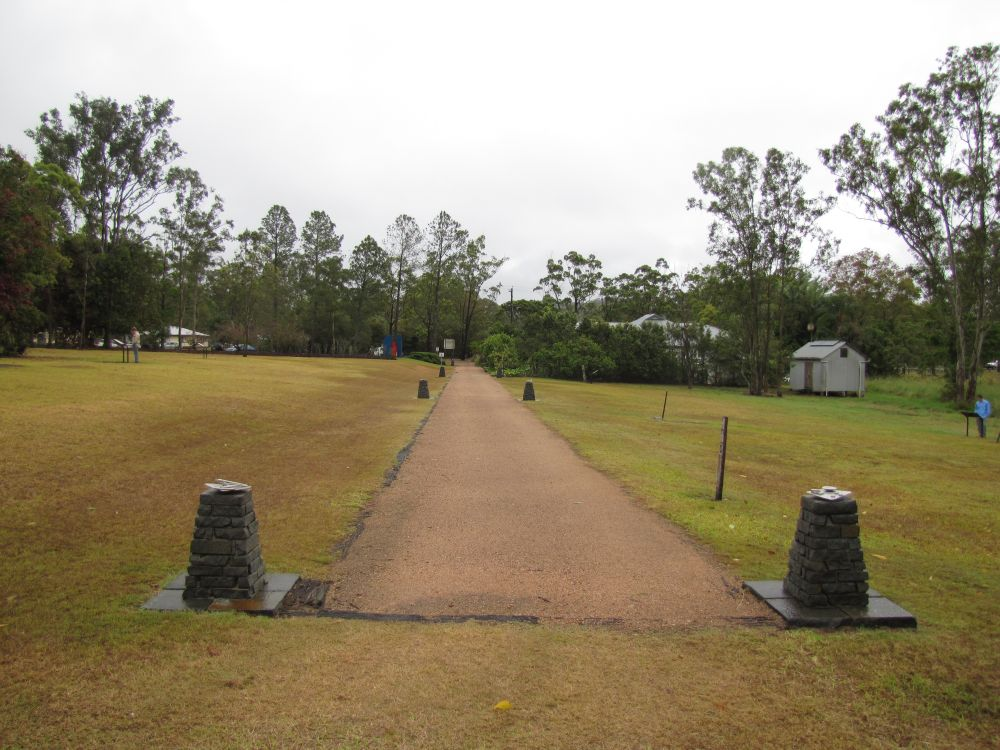
- Site of Chinatown, 2011

- Location within Queensland Location within Australia
- 17.2783°S 145.4722°E
- Location: Herberton Road, Atherton, Tablelands Region, Queensland, Australia

History
- Design period: 1870s–1890s (late 19th century)
- Built: 1880s–1920s

Queensland Heritage Register
- Official name: Chinatown, Cedar Camp
- Type: state heritage (archaeological)
- Designated: 21 October 1992
- Reference no.: 600011
- Significant period: 1880s–1940s (historical)
- Significant components: trees/plantings, well

Chinatown is a heritage-listed settlement at Herberton Road, Atherton, Tablelands Region, Queensland, Australia. It was built from 1880s to 1920s. It is also known as Cedar Camp. It was added to the Queensland Heritage Register on 21 October 1992.

== History ==
This open area surrounding the Atherton Chinese Temple was the site of a Chinese settlement which was established in the mid 1880s. It grew to service Chinese tenant farmers in the Atherton area and peaked in importance in the early 1900s when there were over a hundred buildings on site. Its decline began after the first world war when Chinese-held agricultural leases were revoked in favour of returned servicemen and most Chinese left the area. By the late 1940s, virtually all buildings had been removed.

Atherton Chinatown was one of many Chinese settlements that sprang up in Australia during the nineteenth century. The Chinese began to arrive in large numbers following the first gold rushes of the 1850s. Most of them came from provinces in the south east of China where conditions were harsh. Almost all were male and many were poor, having borrowed the money for their fares from Chinese guilds. They hoped to make enough money to pay off their debt, to send money home to their families and to eventually return themselves with enough capital to secure their futures. For mutual support and to maintain contacts with their homeland, they lived and worked together, creating Chinatowns within, or on the fringes of, European settlements.

The discovery of gold on the Palmer River in 1873 led to an influx of miners to far north Queensland. Many of these were Chinese and by 1877 there were 17,000 Chinese on the Palmer River fields, vastly outnumbering the other diggers. Europeans felt threatened by their numbers, by their willingness to work for low recompense and because the Chinese maintained their own culture. Restrictions were placed on Chinese immigration and they were denied access to new mineral fields. Because of this, and as alluvial gold began to peter out on the Palmer field, the Chinese moved away and looked for other ways to earn money.

Tin was discovered on the Wild River in 1880 which gave impetus to the development of the Atherton Tablelands. This is an area of volcanic plateaux, set in the Great Dividing Range, which has a mild climate and fertile soil. It was originally heavily forested and a group of Chinese, working with European timbergetters, moved into the Atherton area in the early 1880s. They established a settlement called Cedar Camp across Piebald Creek from the Europeans and a short distance from the tiny settlement of Prior's Pocket. In August 1885, this area was surveyed, renamed Atherton and land sales began.

Queensland legislation prevented Chinese land ownership, but many of them entered into leasing arrangements with Europeans. The newly cleared land could not be ploughed, but was well suited to the hand cultivation methods favoured by the Chinese, who became successful farmers. They supplied the developing town of Herberton with fruit and vegetables and pioneering the growing of maize, which became an important commercial crop for the area. The rents which they paid the land owners also provided a valuable source of income during the difficult economic period of the 1890s.

Atherton's Chinatown is on a lease originally granted to Frederick Loder in 1887 and which was transferred freehold to Edward Jasper Loder in 1890. By 1897, there were over 180 Chinese living on the site which developed as a short main street lined with small timber and iron shops and houses. At the height of its development, around 1909, commercial premises located here included corn merchants, food and general goods stores, a herbalist, two gambling dens and a place of entertainment which employed musicians. There was also a Tong society meeting hall and a temple. At the time, this was the social and commercial centre for over a thousand Chinese people who were living in the Atherton district.

In 1911, the overthrow of the Manchu dynasty and the declaration of a republic in China caused divisions in the Chinatown society. The authority of the Tong, which acted as an administrative body, was undermined, gambling crept in and there were violent incidents. Some Chinese moved away at this point. There was also increasing local pressure to have the land reserved for European use as the mild climate was thought to be particularly suitable and the land was now ready for ploughing or for dairying. Following the First World War, leases farmed by Chinese were made over to soldier settlers and most of the Chinese moved south or to nearby coastal towns. During the 1920s many buildings were demolished or moved for reuse elsewhere. A handful of old men remained in the settlement until the late 1940s and the temple continued in intermittent use until the mid 1970s. The land on which Chinatown stood was purchased by a group of local Chinese families and was eventually purchased outright by the Fong On family, who had originally lived in the town. The National Trust of Queensland obtained a grant to carry out research on the site in 1975 and the temple was offered to them by the Fong On family in the following year to ensure its preservation. This donation was finalised in 1980.

In 1991 John Fong On subdivided Lot 2 on RP740536 gifting the remained of Lot 2 to the National Trust of Queensland and selling the newly created Lot 3 RP912545 to the Atherton Shire Council. This part of the site contains no buildings. Since the subdivision reports suggest that Lot 3 may contain archaeologically interesting material.

In the years since then the temple complex has been researched and conserved as a place museum. A number of research projects have also been carried out on the town site by the Material Culture Unit of the James Cook University. These included research and documentation of the settlement and temple by Latif Ibrahim in 1981, a 1986 project to map remaining surface relics and the original street, and excavations undertaken in 1991 and 1992. Although some damage has been done to the site by the casual digging of collectors in the late 1970s and early 1980s, it is believed that some areas remain undisturbed.

== Description ==
The site is approximately 4.5 hectares (11 acres) in area and is located on the gently sloping area to the south of Piebald Creek and to the east of the Herberton Road. The site comprises Lot 2 on RP897109 facing Herberton Atherton Road to the west and extending southward to form the northern and eastern boundaries of the Atherton Chinese Temple site. Lot 3 RP912545 faces Herberton Street and is site on the southern boundary of the temple site.

The location of the site appears to have been selected with the aid of geomancy as evidenced by its relationship to natural features such as the Herberton Range and the creek.

It is located on dark grey clay soils and the northern, low-lying portion is subject to inundation during wet seasons. Vegetation cover is mainly guinea grass, lantana and clumps of Japanese sunflowers. There are some eucalypts, tea-trees and grevillea and the area is dotted with mango trees introduced by the Chinese. The ground close to the temple is regularly cut to keep the grass low. Dense vegetative cover occurs over much of the site and may help to protect the extensive scatter of artefacts above ground. Evidence of occupation includes wells, buildings sites and possibly plantings.

Interpretative signs which mark key sites and illustrate aspects of life in Chinatown were erected by the National Trust in 1996.

== Heritage listing ==
Chinatown was listed on the Queensland Heritage Register on 21 October 1992 having satisfied the following criteria.

The place is important in demonstrating the evolution or pattern of Queensland's history.

Chinatown, Atherton is important in demonstrating the evolution of Queensland history in that the Chinese were pioneers of agriculture in north Queensland and as such played an important role in the opening up of the Atherton area for settlement.

The place demonstrates rare, uncommon or endangered aspects of Queensland's cultural heritage.

It is a major Chinese settlement site in tropical Queensland and has never been built over. Such a concentrated site of Chinese occupation is rare in Australia making Chinatown an important archaeological site.

The place has potential to yield information that will contribute to an understanding of Queensland's history.

It has potential to yield information that will contribute to an understanding of Queensland's history by demonstrating the formation of, and life within, a large Chinese settlement in Australia.
