= Box truss =

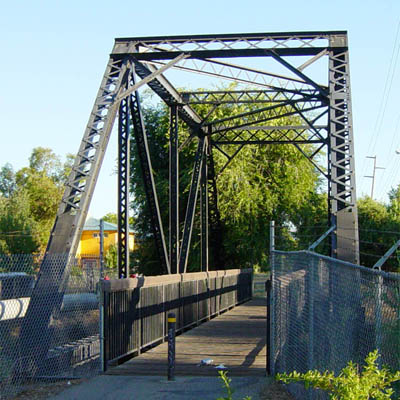
A box truss structure in a bridge of the Southern Pacific Railroad in California

A box truss is a structure composed of three or more chords connected by transverse and/or diagonal structural elements.

== Application ==
Box trusses are commonly used in certain types of aircraft fuselages, electric power pylons, large radio antennas, and many bridge structures. (For various truss arrangements used see truss bridge.)

By using what are in effect stiff panels in a cylindrical arrangement the resulting structure can have a high resistance to axial torsion (twisting along its long axis) and a higher resistance to buckling in its highly loaded sides.

When finished as an open structure the truss will be less subject to wind drag and to aeroelastic effects than would a completely enclosed structure.
