= Virtual campus =

Online offering of a college or university

A virtual campus or e campus, refers to the online offerings of a college or university where college work is completed either partially or wholly online, often with the assistance of the teacher, professor, or teaching assistant. Many colleges and universities now offer such courses (or entire degree programs) either partially or wholly online. There are an estimated 4,500 such institutions with total enrollments approaching perhaps 2 million.

The majority of students using virtual campuses to obtain online degrees are adults students for three main reasons:

- Flexibility – Adults with full-time jobs and families would find it impossible to attend daily at a traditional school setting. Online classes allow students to work at their own pace and work around their busy lives.
- Cost – The cost of an online degree is relatively cheaper than at a traditional college setting. Obtaining your degree online eliminates costs such as classroom costs and facility upkeep costs that traditional students are required to pay because they are using the campus. However, the cheaper cost of an online degree does not diminish the value of the degree.
- Broad Choices – Students can remain at home and have availability to degrees that may not be offered by universities or colleges nearby.

Schools use a variety of tools for conducting classes – typically called learning management systems (LMS) or course management systems (CMS). CMS may also refer to CONTENT Management Systems.

Some of the aspects that go under virtual campus includes various types of learning activities such as lectures, homework, discussions, readings, assignments. Classes are usually self paced using online documents and databases that might be available to them. Tests and other assignments are available online in specific programs used for online classes. Other methods used in virtual campus are live sessions, videoconferencing, discussing and sharing various applications. Individuals are able to access the materials any time they want under the teacher's control and are able to access anywhere online where they're able to access internet usage. Email is a big part of the virtual campuses and is often used before, during and after sessions. This aids individuals in exchanging information and or point them to the right direction that would be useful in increasing and understanding various methods available to them via documents and online sources.

== Virtual campus experience ==
Alexander et al. conducted a study and found that the use of technology did not in itself result in improvements in the quality of learning but that success depended on the design of the whole learning experience. There are two main models for the virtual campus emerging. The first of these is one in which an educational institution uses communication and information technologies (CITs) to provide all conventional services. In the second model, services are unbundled, with some being sub-contracted to other organizations. Virtual campuses are learner centered, and students can customize their virtual campus to fit their learning styles and preferences thanks to the Internet and telecommunication technologies. Teleconferencing, videoconferencing, computer-based interactive multimedia packages, and various forms of computer mediated communication are technologies that facilitate synchronous delivery of content and real-time interaction between teacher and students as well as opportunities for problem-solving either individually or as a team.

== See also ==
- Computer-assisted language learning
- Diploma mill While many distance education programs provide valuable instruction, others offer degrees with little requirements.
- Distance education
- Educational technology
- Online learning (aka E-Learning) (Related: E-learning glossary)
- MLearning
- Virtual education
- Virtual university
