= Irvinebank State School =

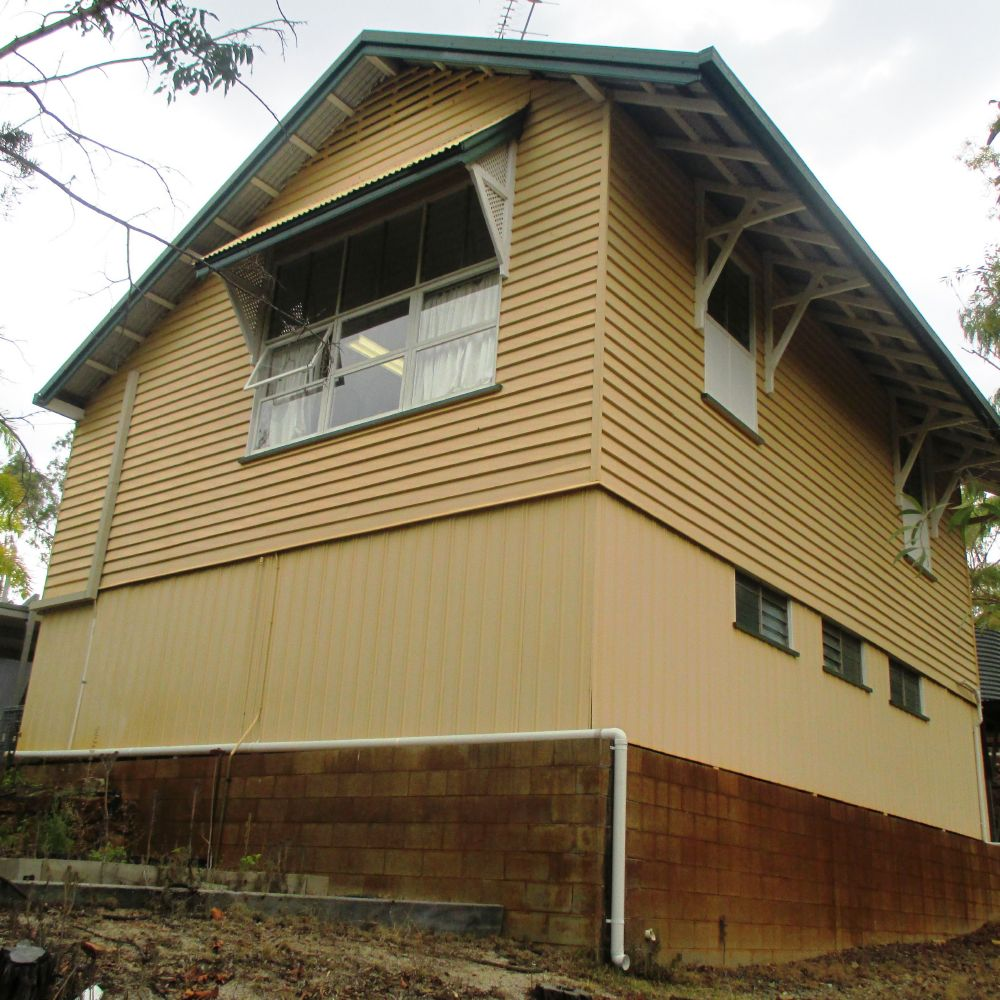
- Irvinebank State School, from the east, 2014

- Location within Queensland
- 17.4265°S 145.2044°E
- Location: High Street, Irvinebank, Shire of Mareeba, Queensland, Australia

History
- Design period: 1870s–1890s (Late 19th century)
- Built: 1889–1906, 1891

Site notes
- Architect(s): Robert and John Ferguson; Queensland Department of Public Works

Queensland Heritage Register
- Official name: Irvinebank State School
- Type: state heritage
- Designated: 1 May 2015
- Reference no.: 602850
- Type: Education, research, scientific facility: School-state
- Theme: Educating Queenslanders: Providing primary schooling
- Builders: Thomas Gordon, August Conrad Ferdinand Ohnesorgen

Irvinebank State School is a heritage-listed state school at High Street, Irvinebank, Shire of Mareeba, Queensland, Australia. It was designed by Robert and John Ferguson, Queensland Department of Public Works and built from 1889 to 1906 by Thomas Gordon and August Conrad Ferdinand Ohnesorgen. It was added to the Queensland Heritage Register on 1 May 2015.

== History ==
Irvinebank State School opened in 1889 in the small private mining town of Irvinebank. As the town prospered, the teaching building (1889) was extended in 1899 and 1906, and other structures and landscape elements were built, including a playshed (1891). The town declined after 1907. In 2015 the school buildings remain remarkably intact. Irvinebank State School has been in continuous operation since establishment and has been a focus for the local community as a place for important social and cultural activity.

Traditionally the land of the Bar Barrum people, European settlement at Irvinebank began in the 1880s. Irvinebank's existence is due to John Moffat (1841–1918), whose mining enterprises drove much of the economic activity in north Queensland between 1884 and 1914. In 1883 tin lodes at Gibbs Creek were purchased by Moffat's partner in the Glen Smelting Company, George Young, while Moffat was overseas. In 1884 Moffat had a dam constructed at Gibbs Creek, above which he built his residence, Loudoun House, and the locality was named Irvinebank. The Loudoun Mill, a battery and smelter, was constructed and commenced operations in December 1884. A School of Arts building was erected in Irvinebank in 1885, and the first sale of allotments in the town occurred in February 1886. Irvinebank became the centre of Moffat's business empire, and Loudoun Mill was expanded between 1886 and 1904.

In June 1886 a public meeting was held at Irvinebank to elect members of a building committee to establish a provisional school. Irvinebank Provisional School opened on 18 October 1886, in a building south of Jessie Street. By the end of December 1886, enrolment had reached 16 pupils.

The provision of state-administered education was important to the governments of Australia. After introducing the Education Act 1860 the number of public schools in Queensland grew from four in 1860 to 230 by 1875. The State Education Act 1875 instituted free, compulsory, and secular primary education and established the Department of Public Instruction. The establishment of schools was considered an essential step in the development of early communities and integral to their success. Locals often donated land and labour for a school's construction and the school community contributed to maintenance and development. Schools became a community focus, a symbol of progress, and a source of pride, with enduring connections formed with past pupils, parents, and teachers.

Irvinebank soon had the population to support a state school, thanks to increased tin production. The economy of the town experienced two peak periods of prosperity - 1888–90 and 1899–1904 - boosted by the opening of the Vulcan tin mine in 1889, and by expansion at the Loudoun Mill. At its peak in the early 1900s, the Loudoun Mill was the largest tin battery and smelter in Australia. In 1888, the School Committee sought to upgrade Irvinebank Provisional School to a state school and raised 20 percent of the cost of a new building, as the Department of Public Instruction refused to allow the existing facility to be used. A new site, steep but closer to the centre of town than a surveyed school reserve further northeast, was reserved in May 1889; comprising 2 acres (0.81 ha), 1 rood 19.8 perches (1,510 m^{2}). Construction tenders were called in May 1889, and the new school buildings (teaching building and teacher's residence) were completed soon after. The upgrade to a state school was officially approved on 25 July 1889.

The teaching building at Irvinebank was built to a standard design by architect John Ferguson. The government developed standard plans for its school buildings to help ensure consistency and economy. From the 1860s until the 1960s, Queensland school buildings were predominantly timber framed, an easy and cost-effective approach that also enabled the government to provide facilities in remote areas. Standard designs were continually refined in response to changing needs and educational philosophy and Queensland school buildings were particularly innovative in climate control, lighting, and ventilation. Standardisation produced distinctly similar schools across Queensland with complexes of typical components.

In 1879 the Department of Public Instruction appointed its own Superintendent of Buildings to be responsible for the design of all government schools, the first appointee being the builder-architect Robert Ferguson. Ferguson immediately revised the design of schools to address deficiencies in ventilation and lighting. This period of school design was pivotal in this regard. Ferguson introduced tall and decorative ventilation spires to the roof and louvred panels to the gable apex to vent the classrooms. Additional and larger windows were incorporated with high sill heights that did not allow draughts and sunlight to enter the room. The overall form was lowset on brick piers. In larger schools, multiple classrooms were arranged symmetrically around a parade ground. The designs remained single-skin to eliminate "receptacles for germs and vermin" but were lined externally rather than internally to address the previous weathering problem. Importantly, Ferguson's buildings were decoratively-treated with a variety of elaborate timber work and were heralded by educationalists as "far superior in design, material and workmanship to any we have before built". In 1885 Robert Ferguson was replaced by his brother John Ferguson who continued to implement his brother's designs until John's death in 1893, when responsibility for school buildings passed back to the Department of Public Works. The Ferguson period (1879–1893) is distinct and marked by extensive redesign of school buildings including associated structures and furniture.

The original teaching building at Irvinebank State School was a lowset timber-framed building with 8-foot (2.4 m) verandahs front and back, clad externally with weatherboards, and had a gable roof. It was single-skin with louvred panels in the gable apexes to ventilate the interior and tall, highset windows on all sides. It accommodated one large classroom 34 by 18 feet (10.4 m × 5.5 m) and the rear verandah accommodated a hatroom and lavatory enclosure at either end. The classroom had a coved ceiling and the building was attractively-decorated with modest "carpenter gothic" timberwork.

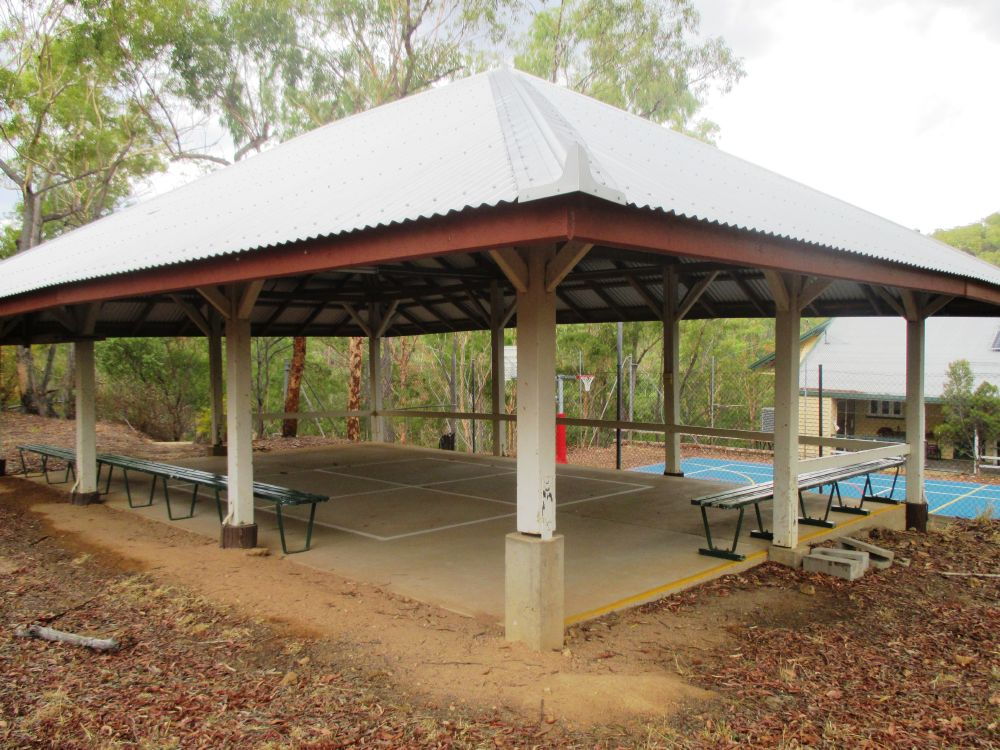
Playshed from the west, 2014

In 1891 a playshed was built at Irvinebank State School. The Queensland education system recognised the importance of play in the school curriculum and, as school sites were originally cleared of all vegetation, the provision of all-weather outdoor space was needed. Playsheds were designed as free-standing shelters, with fixed timber seating between posts and earth or decomposed granite floors that provided covered play space and doubled as teaching space when needed These structures were timber-framed and generally open sided, although some were partially enclosed with timber boards or corrugated galvanised iron sheets. The hipped (or less frequently, gabled) roofs were clad with timber shingles or corrugated iron. Playsheds were a typical addition to state schools across Queensland between c. 1880s and the 1950s, although less frequently constructed after c. 1909, with the introduction of highset school buildings with understorey play areas. Built to standard designs, playsheds that ranged in size relative to student numbers. The playshed at Irvinebank was typical of the standard designs. Standing at a distance behind of the teaching building, it was a timber-framed, 10-post open-sided shelter, 30 by 20 feet (9.1 m × 6.1 m) with a hipped roof and perimeter seats.

Irvinebank continued to prosper throughout the 1890s. Moffat formed the Irvinebank Mining Company in 1890 and Irvinebank was booming by 1899, assisted by the 1890s decline of the nearby silver mining town of Montalbion. A new School of Arts building was erected in 1890, to be replaced by the Irvinebank School of Arts Hall in 1900. The office of the Walsh Divisional Board was transferred from Montalbion to Irvinebank by 1898, at which point there were 107 children attending Irvinebank State School. By the end of the 1890s:

"the townscape comprised two-roomed timber-framed galvanised iron cottages ... Shops and hotels straggled along both McDonald and Jessie Streets. Jack and Newell's store, Hales' Royal Hotel and the adjacent Orient Hotel were on the Herberton Road".

As the town grew, the school expanded. In July 1895 additional land to the northeast was added to the school reserve, comprising 1 acre (0.40 ha). To cope with the growth in student numbers, the teaching building was extended in 1899 to a design by the Department of Public Works. Under the stewardship of the Department of Public Works, which retained the responsibility for school design until 2013, and through the involvement of some of Queensland's most innovative architects, school buildings became more advanced and diverse. This was the outcome of years of systematic reform and experimentation.

From 1893 the Department of Public Works greatly improved the natural ventilation and lighting of classroom interiors, experimenting with different combinations of roof ventilators, ceiling and wall vents, larger windows, dormer windows and ducting. Achieving an ideal or even adequate level of natural light in classrooms, without glare, was of critical importance to educators and consequently it became central to the design and layout of all school buildings. For timber-framed buildings, single-skin construction was favoured for its heat dissipation ability and economy. Often the building was lined on the interior rather than exterior, providing a smooth, cleanable surface that provided better interior light. The resulting externally-exposed stud framing was protected from the weather by wide verandahs. The introduction of highset buildings began in the late 1890s, providing better ventilation and additional teaching and covered play space underneath.

A notable technical innovation introduced at this time was a continuous ventilation flap on the wall at floor level. This hinged board could be opened to increase air flow into the space and, combined with a ceiling vent and large roof fleche, improved internal air quality and decreased internal temperatures effectively. To increase ventilation and lighting and decrease building cost, a return to only having a verandah on one side of the classroom (with generous eaves overhang on the other) occurred during this period, quickly becoming the form most commonly constructed across Queensland.

In September 1899, the tender of Thomas Gordon for £365 10s was accepted to extend the teaching building at Irvinebank, doubling its size. The new section replicated the existing building and added elements for providing better lighting and ventilation that were characteristic of the new direction in school design. Accommodating one classroom 34 by 18 feet (10.4 m × 5.5 m), the lowset extension was made to the northeast by removing the existing northeastern gable end wall (including rear hat room and lavatory enclosure) and refixing it as the gable end in the new work. Originally only having three window sashes, the gable end window was widened to seven sashes. A new hatroom enclosure was added to the rear verandah and a metal ventilation fleche to the roof at the junction between old and new, to better ventilate both classrooms. Divided from the earlier classroom by a single-skin partition with glazing and a connecting door, the interior of the new classroom had unlined walls, a coved ceiling, and tall, highset windows in all walls.

Irvinebank State School reflected the town's continued prosperity into the 1900s. Enrolment was 221, with an attendance of 193 for March 1905. The town's population also increased, from 619 in 1901 to 1264 in 1911. Tin prices were high between 1900 and 1907, and by 1907 Herberton and Irvinebank were the centre of Queensland's base metal industry.

Due to a need for more space, another extension was made to the teaching building, also to a design by the Department of Public Works. August Conrad Ferdinand Ohnesorgen's tender of £527 5s was accepted in December 1905 and construction was completed in 1906. Attached to the end of the 1899 classroom, the extension was similar to the earlier building but was oriented at right angles and introduced further lighting and ventilation methods. It was a single-skin timber-framed building clad with weatherboards and had a gable roof. The gable end walls had packed weatherboards in the gable end apexes to vent the interior. Accommodating one classroom 34 by 18 feet (10.4 m × 5.5 m), it had a coved ceiling and tall, highset windows on all sides. The teacher's residence was also extended in 1906.

Irvinebank's prosperity began to decline from 1907. Moffat's (and therefore, Irvinebank's) fortunes fell due to factors such as the cost of the private Stannary Hills Tramways built between Stannary Hills and Irvinebank, industrial action, a steep drop in assays at the Vulcan mine, and a fall in tin prices. Due to excessive debt, Moffat was forced to retire as director of the Irvinebank Mining Company in 1912, and his business partner John Reid became manager. In 1919 the Loudoun Mill was purchased by the Queensland Government and was reopened as the Irvinebank State Treatment Works. The population of Irvinebank dropped sharply to 607 by 1921 and 147 by 1933. After a long period of government ownership and declining fortunes, the mill was leased to a private operator in 1983.

After 1906, the Irvinebank State School teaching building remained relatively unaltered. Over time, earthworks have occurred to flatten the sloping terrain around and under the Ferguson building, which included replacing all understorey posts and making enclosures under the building. Minor changes occurred in 1961 when the 1906 classroom interior was lined with sheet material and the windows were altered to have lower sills and timber-framed awning sashes. In 1969 another school reserve was gazetted 700 metres (2,300 ft) to the southwest of the school, for a sports field, and a new school residence was constructed there in 1979. The original residence was later removed. In 1992 part of the southwest end of the 1889 school reserve was reconfigured as road reserve.

In 2015, the school continues to operate from the site and the Ferguson teaching building, with its 1899 and 1906 extensions, and the 1891 playshed, remain intact. The state school is important to the town and generations of Irvinebank students have been taught there.

== Description ==
Irvinebank State School stands on a 1.28-hectare (3.2-acre) site in the centre of the small town of Irvinebank. The school is approached from the southwest by an unsealed road off Herberton Petford Road. The teaching building stands on the centre of the site, facing southeast down the steep slope with rock wall terraces behind forming level platforms for the tennis court and playshed.

=== Teaching Building ===
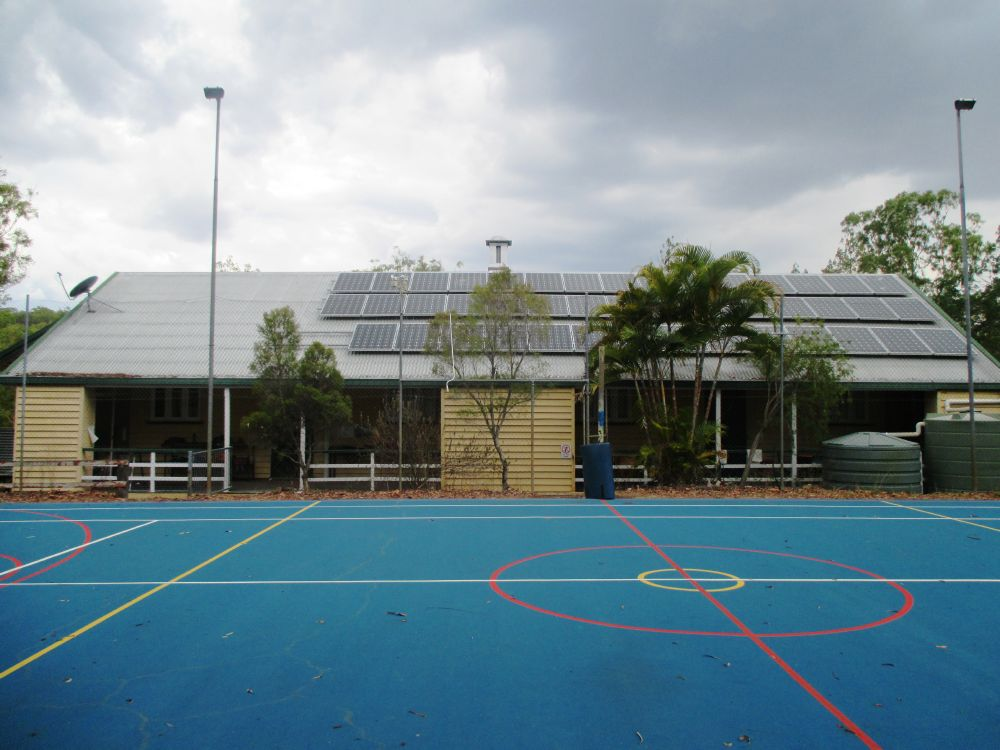
Teaching building from northwest. 1889 (on right), 1899 extension to left, 2014

The teaching building, comprising three classrooms, is an L-shaped timber-framed and clad building with a corrugated metal-clad gable roof. The natural slope has been terraced so the building is lowset at the rear and highset at the front. The exterior is clad with weatherboards and the roof with corrugated metal sheets. The 1889 and 1899 classrooms form the long wing with the 1906 section branching off at a right angle.

The 1889 wing is intact. Verandahs on the front (southeast) and rear (northwest) have stop-chamfered posts and timber post and rail balustrades. Original hatroom enclosures survive at the centre and at both ends. The wing retains original tall, narrow windows with high sills in all walls, sheltered by hoods with latticed cheeks in the gable end walls. Louvred panels in the gable end wall apexes vent the roof space and an original metal fleche stands on the centre of the ridge, venting both classrooms. From the verandahs, timber French doors with stop-chamfered frames and tall centre pivot fanlights open into the classrooms which are separated by a beaded tongue and groove board lined partition with a half glazed door. The interior walls are unlined, with timber wall framing and tie-beams exposed internally. The coved ceiling is lined with boards and has central lattice ventilation panels. Solar panels mounted on the roof and the metal shade structure attached to the southeastern elevation are modern additions and are not of cultural heritage significance.

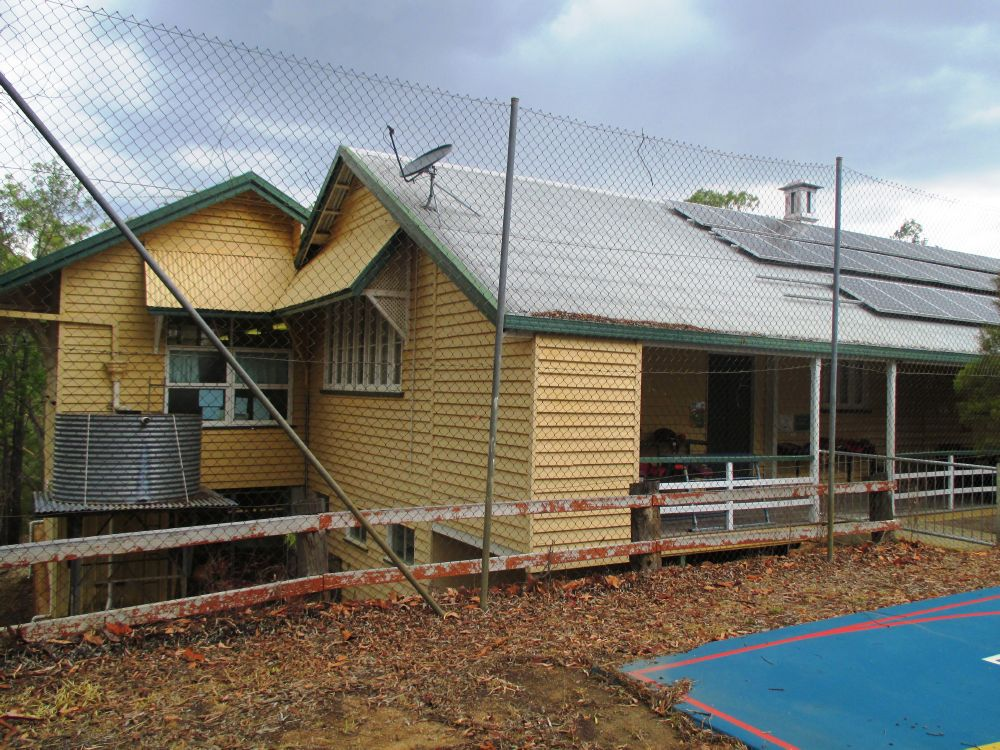
View of 1899 extension (right) and 1906 extension (left), 2014

The 1906 wing has a verandah on the southwest side with square timber posts and an original hatroom enclosure at the southeastern end. Packed weatherboards at the apex of the gable end walls vent the roof space. Original window hoods with latticed cheeks are retained on the gable end walls, sheltering windows with lower sills. The sashes and fanlights are all later replacements within the original openings, comprising timber-framed awning sashes or steel louvres. A large area of windows has been inserted into the verandah wall, however, the original timber French doors survive. The southwestern verandah has been enclosed with later weatherboards (external) and flat sheeting (internal). The interior walls are lined with later flat sheeting and the coved ceiling is lined with boards and has ventilation panels, which have been sheeted over. Timber tie-beams are exposed within the space.

Some early school forms (long bench seats) and a school bell are retained in the building.

The understorey stumps of the building are later replacements in steel and concrete and small enclosures have been made - none of which is of cultural heritage significance. The solar panels on the roof, metal walkway covers at the south, and the external window-shade louvres on the south western elevation of the 1906 wing are also later additions and are not of cultural heritage significance.

=== Tennis Court ===
A tennis court stands immediately behind the teaching building, retained by rock walls.

=== Playshed ===
A ten-post, timber-framed playshed stands on higher ground immediately northwest of the tennis court. It has open sides and a hipped roof clad with corrugated metal sheets. The timber roof framing is exposed and the floor is concrete.

== Heritage listing ==
Irvinebank State School was listed on the Queensland Heritage Register on 1 May 2015 having satisfied the following criteria.

The place is important in demonstrating the evolution or pattern of Queensland's history.

Irvinebank State School, established 1889, is important in demonstrating the evolution of state education and its associated architecture in Queensland. The place retains excellent, representative examples of standard government school building designs that were an architectural response to prevailing government educational philosophies.

The erection and extension of the school's teaching building and playshed between 1889 and 1906 is a result of Irvinebank's growth and prosperity over this period, when the mining town played an important role in north Queensland's economy.

The place is important in demonstrating the principal characteristics of a particular class of cultural places.

Irvinebank State School is important in demonstrating the principal characteristics of early Queensland state schools. These include: generous, landscaped sites with mature shade trees; playshed and assembly/play areas; and timber-framed teaching buildings of standard designs that incorporate verandahs and classrooms with high levels of natural light and ventilation.

Together, the three classrooms of the teaching building (1889, 1899, and 1906) illustrate a marked period of experimentation in school design (c. 1879-1914) and illustrate an evolution in modest, timber-framed school buildings for small communities.

The Ferguson building (1889) and the extension designed by the Department of Public Works (1899) are highly intact, which is rare. They are important in demonstrating the principal characteristics of these two types, retaining: a lowset form with a gable roof; single-skin, timber-framed and clad construction; wide verandahs to the front and rear of large, lofty classrooms; high-quality, modest timber decorative detailing; and effective natural lighting and ventilation features.

The 1906 extension designed by the Department of Public Works is also intact and is important in demonstrating the characteristics of this type, including: high-set form with gable roof; verandah to one side only of a large, lofty classroom; and effective natural lighting and ventilation features.

The playshed (1891) is important in demonstrating this type. It retains its open-sided, timber-framed form with a hipped roof.

The place has a strong or special association with a particular community or cultural group for social, cultural or spiritual reasons.

Schools have always played an important part in Queensland communities. They typically retain significant and enduring connections with former pupils, parents, and teachers; provide a venue for social interaction and volunteer work; and are a source of pride, symbolising local progress and aspirations.

Irvinebank State School has a strong and ongoing association with the Irvinebank community. It was established in 1886 through the fundraising efforts of the local community and generations of Irvinebank children have been taught there. The place is important for its contribution to the educational development of Irvinebank.

== See also ==
- List of schools in Far North Queensland
- History of state education in Queensland
