= Irvinebank Dam =

Timber and concrete dam in Far North Queensland, Australia

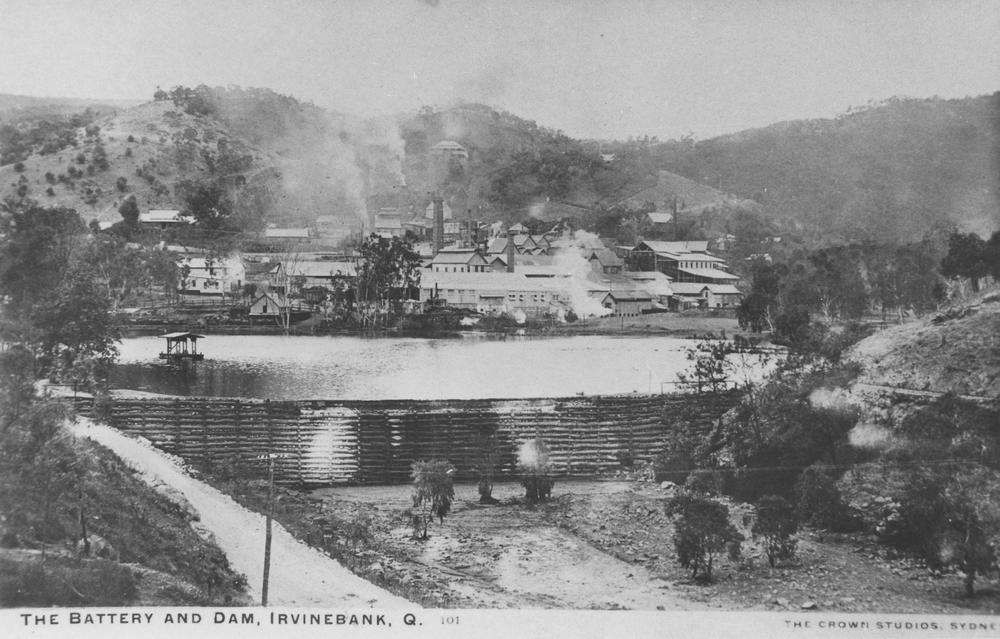
- The dam in c. 1906 (Source: State Library of Queensland)

- Location of the weir in Queensland
- Interactive map of Irvinebank Dam
- Country: Australia
- Location: Irvinebank Far North Queensland
- Coordinates: 17°25′45″S 145°12′00″E
- Purpose: Industrial water supply (historical)
- Status: Operational
- Opening date: c. 1885

Dam and spillways
- Type of dam: Timber and concrete weir
- Impounds: Gibbs Creek; McDonald Creek

Reservoir
- Total capacity: 150 ML (120 acre⋅ft)
- Surface area: 4.9–5.3 ha (12–13 acres)

The Irvinebank Dam, also known as the Loudoun Weir or the Loudoun Dam, is a heritage-listed timber and concrete weir across the Gibbs Creek and McDonald Creek, near Irvinebank, in Far North Queensland, Australia. The weir was constructed in c. 1885 when the Vulcan Mine and a tin battery were built; and is approximately 34 km (21 mi) south-eest of Atherton and 20 kilometres (12 mi) west of Herberton.

== History ==
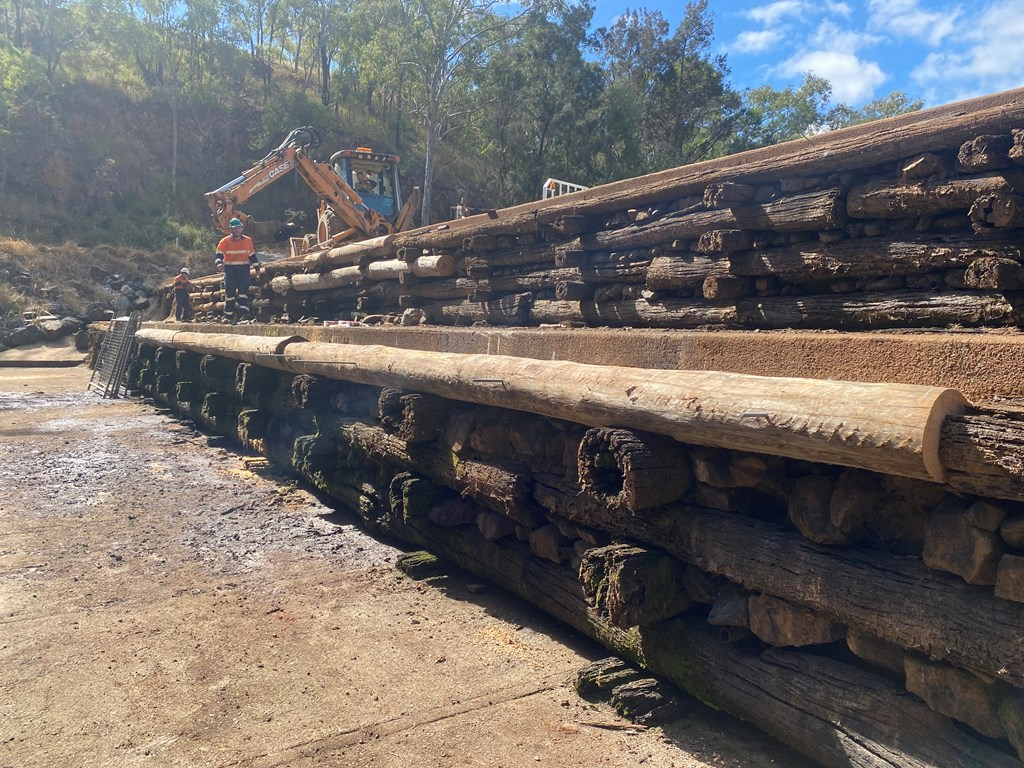
Repairs to the 135-year-old weir, in 2021

The two creeks which form the basis of the dam at Irvinebank were known as Gibbs Creek and McDonald Creek, named in honour of early colonial prospectors. The battery was erected on the Gibbs Creek frontage, and the dam was constructed just below the junction of these two creeks.

When full, the dam covered an area of approximately 4.9–5.3 hectares (12–13 acres), with depths varying from approximately 0.61–4.57 metres (2–15 ft). The original capacity was 150 megalitres (120 acre⋅ft).

The dam was upgraded with concrete in 2006, retaining the original timber in the facade. Following the discovery of a leak in 2017, work was carried out between December 2020 and August 2021 to repair the leak and replace six original logs in the facade with "like-for-like" new timber. The upgrades were recognised in 2007 with a Queensland Heritage Council Silver Award.

== See also ==
- List of dams and reservoirs in Australia
- Ibis Dam
- Irvinebank State Treatment Works
- Loudoun House
- Vulcan Mine
