= Irvinebank School of Arts Hall =

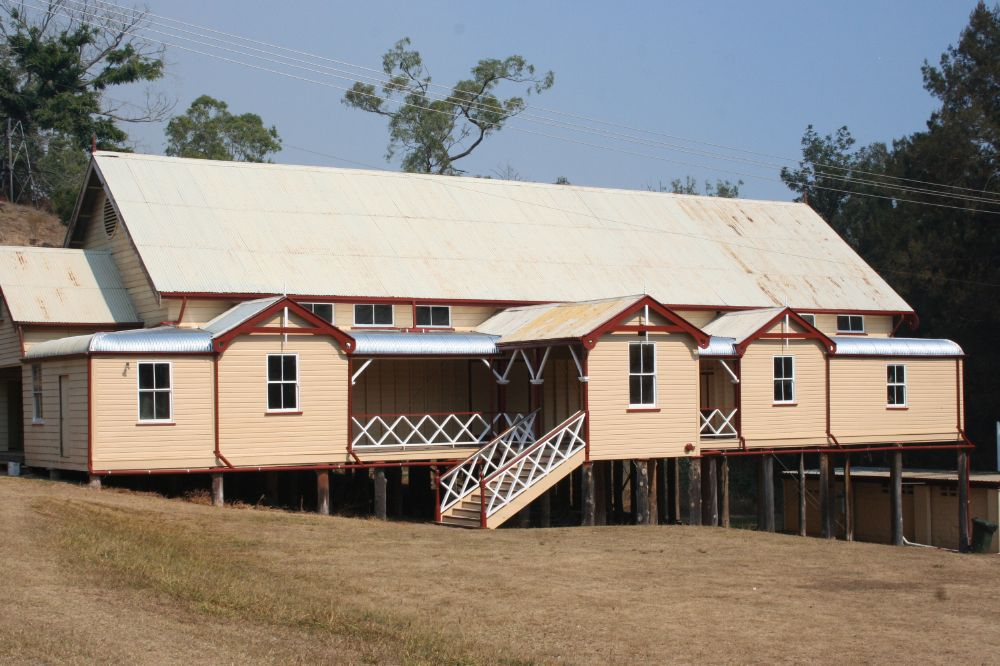
- Irvinebank School of Arts Hall, 2009

- Location within Queensland Location within Australia
- 17.4285°S 145.2044°E
- Location: McDonald Street, Irvinebank, Shire of Mareeba, Queensland, Australia

History
- Design period: 1900–1914 (early 20th century)
- Built: 1900

Site notes
- Architectural style: Classicism

Queensland Heritage Register
- Official name: Irvinebank School of Arts Hall
- Type: state heritage (built)
- Designated: 29 May 1995
- Reference no.: 601619
- Significant period: 1900s (historical); 1900s–1910s (fabric); 1900–ongoing (social); 1900s–ongoing (social)
- Significant components: school of arts

Irvinebank School of Arts Hall is a heritage-listed school of arts at McDonald Street, Irvinebank, Shire of Mareeba, Queensland, Australia. It was built in 1900. It was added to the Queensland Heritage Register on 29 May 1995.

== History ==
The Irvinebank School of Arts Hall was constructed in about 1900, as the third building of the Irvinebank School of Arts Committee. The building reflects the growth of Irvinebank during a period of its prosperity as a base metal mining district.

In 1880 the Great Northern tin lode was discovered in the Herberton area and prominent businessman, John Moffat, and his company, the Glen Smelting Company, soon secured a monopoly over mining and reduction works in the area. Moffat arrived in Queensland from Scotland in 1862, where he soon opened his own business, from which grew his empire. Whilst Moffat was overseas in 1883, his partner, George Young, bought mines in what was then Gibb's Camp, in the Herberton district. Gibb's Camp was renamed Irvinebank after Moffat's birthplace in Scotland, and the Loudoun Mill, comprising a five headed crushing battery and tin smelter, was opened there on 10 December 1884. Moffat envisaged Irvinebank as a major industrial region of the Atherton Tablelands, and established both his business interests and his home (Loudoun House) in the town.

A School of Arts Committee was established in Irvinebank by March 1885, at which time a subscribed sum of £100, along with a subsidy, was used to construct a building. This first building, which no longer stands, was opened by July 1885.

Schools of Arts, also known as mechanics' institutes in other Australian colonies, were popular institutions in many Queensland towns, the first School of Arts was established in 1849 in Brisbane. They were based on an English model, which provided opportunities for the education of wider sections of the community; this being a popular nineteenth century social concern. Typically, in Queensland, the schools were set up by the local community who received a government subsidy. The building usually provided a reading room, subscription library and a public hall for lectures and debating. Upon its opening in 1885, the Irvinebank School of Arts was well patronised "...(with) sound judgement...been displayed...in expending a good portion of the funds on books, papers and leading weekly journals...instead of putting too much into the building".

Irvinebank experienced rapid development during the late 1880s and 1890s, when tin mining was successful, particularly after the opening of the Vulcan Tin Mine in 1889, subsequently purchased by Moffat, which became one of the most successful tin mines in the district. Irvinebank was further boosted after 1894 when low silver prices lead to adjacent towns, such as Montalbion, experiencing severe downturns.

This prosperity at Irvinebank is reflected in the various Schools of Arts buildings that were built as previous buildings became inadequate. In 1890 there is evidence of the renovation of the first building that was vacated for a larger and more substantial second School of Arts building. This may have been constructed adjacent to where the Queensland National Bank would be built and across the street from where the third School of Arts building would stand. This second building was a simple rectangular timber building, with exposed stud framing and gabled roof.

In 1900 a third building was required, and a School of Arts Hall was planned, with a proposal drawn in September 1900 by an unknown author with initials H.H.P., possibly Henry Pope, an architect who was doing work in North Queensland at the time. The new building was planned with a large hall that the previous buildings lacked. Visiting vaudeville and dramatic companies were now able to frequent the town, as provision was made in the new building for stage accommodation. Alterations were carried out to the School of Arts Hall in 1912, enclosing the projecting entrance bay and altering the stage which was to be one of the largest in the north "...(to) suit the largest company which comes around".

However, Irvinebank continued in prosperity only until the First World War, when the metal markets fell. John Moffat had retired to Sydney in 1912, and the Irvinebank smelters were sold to the Queensland Government in 1918, since when the town has steadily declined. The School of Arts Hall continues as a community hall and focal point of Irvinebank activities, to this day.

== Description ==
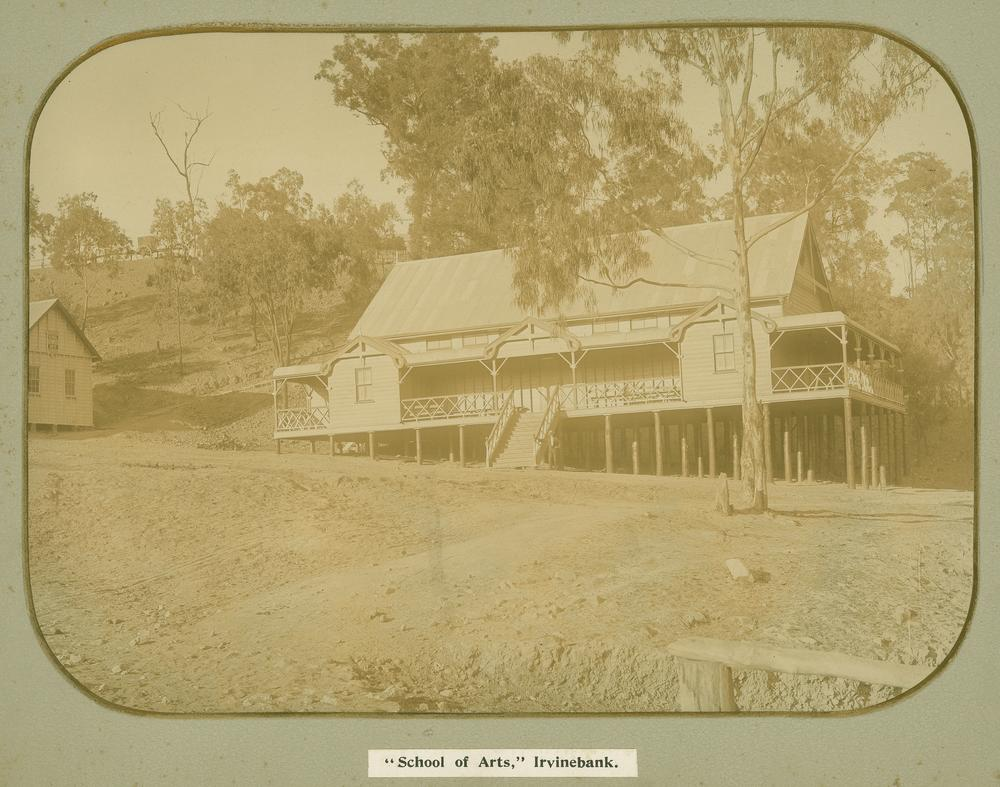
School of Arts Hall, 1904

The Irvinebank School of Arts Hall is a one storeyed timber building, located on a prominent intersection in the Northern Queensland town of Irvinebank. Close to the School of Arts Hall are the Queensland National Bank and John Moffat's House, both of which are culturally significant elements of the townscape. The Hall is surrounded by established trees including several figs.

The building which is raised from the ground on round timber stumps, has a rectangular plan and a corrugated iron gabled roof. The timber-framed building has exposed timber studwork, with horizontal timber lining in some sections which are protected by verandahs. The symmetrically composed north-eastern facade features three projecting gabled bays, enclosed with weatherboards, with simple decorative barge boards, finials and vertical sash windows. These bays emphasise the central entrance and two end corners of this facade. Between the projecting elements is a bull-nosed verandah with diagonally crossed balustrading. The principal entrance, through the projecting central bay, is accessed via a straight timber stair from the east. High level openings, above the verandah awning, provide light and ventilation to the internal hall as do round openings on the gables of the north-eastern and south-western facades.

Internally, the building features a large hall with stage and semi-enclosed verandah spaces running along the two long sides. The hall is fully lined with unpainted red cedar timber boards, on the floor, walls and partially raked ceiling. A timber arch, featuring moulded and reeded sections, forms the proscenium over the elevated stage, which is lined with diagonal timber boarding as are some of the doors.

== Heritage listing ==
Irvinebank School of Arts Hall was listed on the Queensland Heritage Register on 29 May 1995 having satisfied the following criteria.

The place is important in demonstrating the evolution or pattern of Queensland's history.

The Irvinebank School of Arts Hall provides evidence of the growth and prosperity of Irvinebank, as a result of the successful base metal mining industry, encouraged by the prominent Queensland businessman, John Moffat.

The place is important because of its aesthetic significance.

The building is on a prominent site in Irvinebank, and is an integral part of a precinct including the Queensland National Bank and Moffat's house. The Irvinebank School of Arts is a landmark in the town.

The place has a strong or special association with a particular community or cultural group for social, cultural or spiritual reasons.

The Irvinebank School of Arts Hall has been continuously used as a school of arts hall since its construction in about 1900. As the only public hall in Irvinebank, the building has been the focal point of social life in the town.

The place has a special association with the life or work of a particular person, group or organisation of importance in Queensland's history.

The building has associations with Moffat who reputedly financed its construction.

The School of Arts Hall provides intact evidence of the workings of a school of arts, a common institution of many Queensland towns in the nineteenth century.
