= Queensland National Bank, Irvinebank =

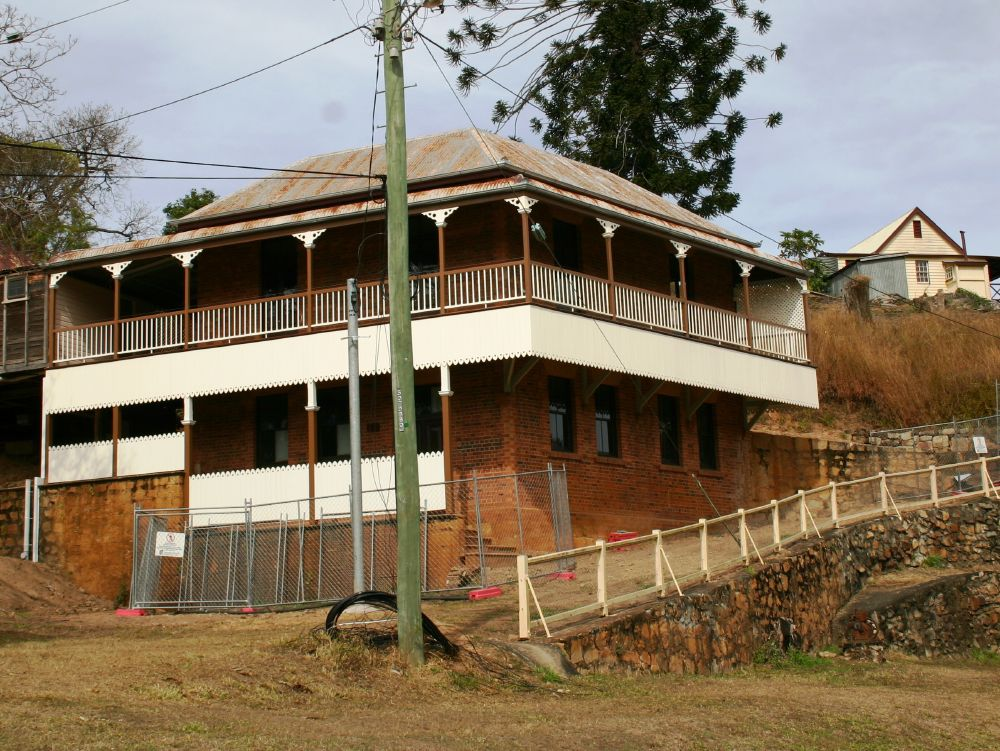
- Queensland National Bank, 2011

- Location within Queensland Location within Australia
- 17.4287°S 145.2047°E
- Location: Jessie Street, Irvinebank, Shire of Mareeba, Queensland, Australia

History
- Design period: 1900–1914 (early 20th century)
- Built: c. 1905

Queensland Heritage Register
- Official name: Queensland National Bank (former)
- Type: state heritage (built)
- Designated: 21 October 1992
- Reference no.: 600678
- Significant period: 1900s (fabric) c. 1905–19? (historical use as Bank)
- Significant components: wall/s – retaining, banking chamber, pathway/walkway, steps/stairway, residential accommodation – manager's house/quarters, out building/s

Queensland National Bank is a heritage-listed former bank building at Jessie Street, Irvinebank, Shire of Mareeba, Queensland, Australia. It was built c. 1905. It was added to the Queensland Heritage Register on 21 October 1992.

== History ==
The former Queensland National Bank building at Irvinebank was erected c. 1905 by the Irvinebank Mining Co. Ltd. A branch of the Queensland National Bank operated from these premises from July 1905 to April 1923.

The Queensland National Bank was established in Brisbane in 1872. The bank was formed by an influential group of Queensland squatters, politicians, lawyers and businessmen who were anxious to secure development capital, which was free from overseas or inter-colonial control. Within 6 months, three branches had been opened. In 1878, the Queensland National Bank opened a branch in London, and in 1880, one in Sydney.

In the 1870s and 1880s the Queensland National Bank was patronized by prominent public figures, including Sir Thomas McIlwraith (Queensland Premier 1879–1882, 1888, 1893) and Sir Arthur Hunter Palmer (Queensland Premier 1870–1874). In September 1879 McIlwraith, a director of the QNB, persuaded the Queensland Parliament to confer on the Queensland National Bank the whole of the Queensland Government's banking business. By 1880 the bank held 40% of the total deposits and advances in Queensland, a higher proportion than any other bank in any Australian colony. The bank exclusively held the government's account for 42 years, until 1921. As the colony's most powerful banking institution, the Queensland National Bank dominated the Queensland economy.

Despite financial scandals and a brief suspension of operation as a result of the "bank smash" in the 1890s, the Queensland National Bank contributed substantially to the development of North Queensland, lending generously to pastoral, sugar, and particularly mining interests. In 1948, it merged with the National Bank of Australasia Ltd.

Irvinebank (originally named Gibbs Camp) was established in 1883 as a tin town and the centre of entrepreneur John Moffat's mining empire. Prior to 1905, banking facilities at Irvinebank were non-existent. Spurred by profitable silver and tin smelters, the nearby town of Montalbion grew quickly during the 1880s and became an administrative centre. During this time, a branch of the Queensland National Bank operated at Montalbion, although it closed in 1893, the economic depression of the early 1890s crippling mining operations and causing the town to decline more rapidly than it had grown. Sources indicate that prior to the opening of the Irvinebank branch, some residents of Irvinebank (including John Moffat) banked at the Herberton branch of the Queensland National Bank.

The Queensland National Bank opened the Irvinebank branch on 6 July 1905. The architect is unknown and it appears that the Queensland National Bank did not the own the premises, but rented the building as an office and manager's residence from the Irvinebank Mining Co. Ltd. The Queensland Government Mining Journal of 15 November 1919:464 states that "the company also owns a brick building used as the Q.N. banking chambers and bank manager's residence".

According to bank records the first manager to occupy the Queensland National Bank building at Irvinebank was Mr Harry Bathurst. Mr James Orr, who remained until 1908, succeeded him after only a short period. Jack Farquar took the role of branch manager from 1908 until 1920 and was followed by Sidney James McCord Allison, who remained in the position until the branch closed on 30 April 1923. Due to the long travelling time and vast distance between the branch and its administrative centre in Brisbane, the managers of remote branches such as Irvinebank had a higher than usual responsibility.

Suggestive of the encouraging progress made by the Queensland National Bank in the town, the Bank of New South Wales also opened a branch in Irvinebank, operating from 1907/8 until 1915.

Moffat's own residence and office was a very short distance from the Queensland National Bank, and was connected to it by a benched pathway, demonstrating the complex inter-relationship between the bank and the North Queensland mining industry. By 1912 John Moffat's overdraft with the Queensland National Bank had reached £58,000. As protection of their loan, the Queensland National Bank demanded Moffat's retirement from the Irvinebank Mining Co. Ltd.

The company's management and interests were passed to Moffat's long time colleague James Smith Reid, but consolidation of its enterprises could not be achieved. John Moffat died at Toowoomba on 28 June 1918 and the major part of Irvinebank's operation, the Loudoun Mill and associated buildings such as the mine manager's residence and the former Queensland National Bank premises, were sold to the Queensland government in 1919. After a lengthy period of mixed operation under government control the Loudoun Mill and associated buildings were leased to a private operator in 1983. From at least this period the former Queensland National Bank building at Irvinebank was used as a private residence.

In January 2004 the Queensland Department of Natural Resources, Mines and Energy removed the lessee from the Loudoun Mill and the Queensland National Bank building. Subsequent inspection revealed that some original joinery in the former bank building had been damaged or removed. Among the missing fixtures were the original red cedar bank counter from the first floor as well as a number of the red cedar doors, door-frames and window frames from the upper storey manager's residence.

== Description ==
The Queensland National Bank building is a square-plan two-storey Federation style bonded brick building that faces Jessie Street adjacent to the School of Arts building at the base of a slope below Loudoun House and the Irvinebank State Treatment Works. It has a corrugated iron roof with an attached cantilevered timber balcony on the upper level. The original unpainted and un-rendered external brickwork is retained. The plan of the building is typical of late 19th-century bank buildings with a former banking chamber at ground floor level and a residence for the manager on the upper level.

The building's corrugated iron roof has a U-shaped hipped configuration, which is worthy of note. While giving the perception of symmetry when viewed from the street, this type of roof was often constructed in order to reduce the height of the roof. Builders usually employed the technique where poor-quality or undersize timber framing was not readily available, even though the original architects plans may have been for another style of roof. As evidenced by this building, the configuration created a central box gutter (in the valley of the roof) that was prone to flooding, placing increased pressure upon the internal structure of the building. A central supporting wall, forming part of the hallway of the upper level, supports the increased load.

The upper level was originally used as a manager's residence. It has a timber balcony with a two-rail dowel balustrade, square stop-chamfered timber posts with shaped timber brackets above capital moulds, and covered by a bullnose corrugated iron roof on two sides. The floor of the balcony has been painted white, with dowels and timber brackets, and red/brown rails and posts on the balustrade. The main roof has quad gutters while the balcony has bullnosed guttering. Several sets of low-waisted six-panel (two timber at the base, the rest is clear glass) French doors with rectangular fanlight and flat arch open onto the balcony. The flat arch is formed by untapered bricks laid in a stretcher bond on about a sixty-degree angle, from either side in opposition, meeting in a v-shape forming a central triangle. This arch is repeated above the windows and French doors on the ground floor. The upper level leads to a freestanding extension at the rear of the building. The extension consists of a square timber framed building with single skinned timber walls and a hipped corrugated iron roof. The interior colour scheme includes the use of white, cream, green, blue and yellow paints.

A set of concrete steps with bullnose edges, leading to a short verandah along the front wall of the building, form the entrance to the lower level. The verandah has square posts and a two-rail dowel balustrade. An external flight of stairs to the upper level joins the verandah at the far end. The entrance on this level is a low waisted four-panel timber French door, with a three-pane rectangular fanlight (two panes of clear glass and one painted) and flat arch. The door and windows on this level are surrounded by a false quoin effect created by brickwork proud of the main wall face. Timber elements appear to have been painted red. External walls are constructed in brick with quoins on each corner. The lower floor has double hung timber sash windows with horns and flat arch. Timbers used to support the balcony rest on corbels between the windows and are painted white. A white-painted awning, made from timber palings finished to form a decorative edge, hangs from the balcony and covers windows on two sides of the building. The rear wall of the ground floor is built into the slope behind. This level consists of 3 rooms, two smaller ones that open onto the main room that runs the length of one side of the building. The main room contained the cedar bank counter, which divided the room into two halves. There is no internal access from this level to the floor above. The original unpainted and un-rendered external brick and stonework is retained. Square blocks of stone have been used in part of the rear wall on the lower level and the verandah. One of the side walls on the lower level also uses blocks of stone and has been painted white.

No significant plantings are associated with the building. There is a cut stone wall which extends from the rear corner of the building following the slope of the hill, parallel to the benched pathway between the Bank and the School of Arts which leads up to Loudoun House. A short distance from the building a flight of five steps is built into the wall, allowing access to the upper terrace and rear wall of the building.

Inspections in January 2004 revealed extensive damage to the internal fabric of the building, including original features. Remaining internal features include timber flooring, single skin timber walls, and cedar and glass panelling and suspended partitions on the lower floor.

The building forms an important part of the streetscape of Irvinebank because of its unusual roof design, wrap-around verandah, brick construction and visual accessibility from the main street.

== Heritage listing ==
The former Queensland National Bank was listed on the Queensland Heritage Register on 21 October 1992 having satisfied the following criteria.

The place is important in demonstrating the evolution or pattern of Queensland's history.

The former Queensland National Bank is important in demonstrating the pattern of Queensland's history, particularly the association between the influential Queensland National Bank and the developing North Queensland tin fields, and as evidence of the infrastructure which developed to support North Queensland mining fields in the late 19th and early 20th centuries.

The place is important because of its aesthetic significance.

The place has aesthetic significance for its architectural qualities, as well as for its contribution to the streetscape through its form, scale and design, which complement the nearby School of Arts, Loudoun House, and other surviving 19th century buildings. Irvinebank's frontier setting, nestled amongst the isolated hills of Far North Queensland provides visual context contributing greatly to the aesthetic value of the building.

The place has a special association with the life or work of a particular person, group or organisation of importance in Queensland's history.

The former Queensland National Bank building is an example of the a special association between the Queensland National Bank and the growth of the north Queensland mining industry, in particular it exemplifies of the close relationship between the Queensland National Bank and the Irvinebank Mining Co Ltd.
