= Irvinebank State Treatment Works =

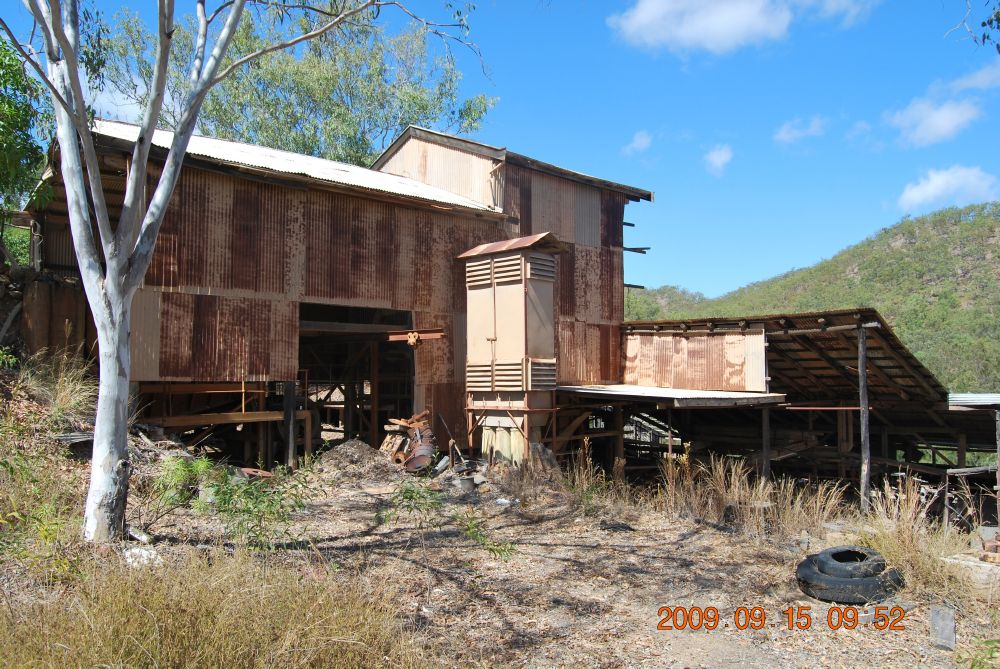
- Irvinebank State Treatment Works, 2009

- Location within Queensland Location within Australia
- 17.4298°S 145.2025°E
- Location: Off Jessie Street, Irvinebank, Shire of Mareeba, Queensland, Australia

History
- Design period: 1870s–1890s (late 19th century)
- Built: 1883–c. 1908

Queensland Heritage Register
- Official name: Irvinebank State Treatment Works, Loudoun Mill
- Type: state heritage (archaeological, built)
- Designated: 21 October 1992
- Reference no.: 600679
- Significant period: 1880s–1910s (fabric); 1880s–1980s (historical)
- Significant components: formation – railway, school of arts, machinery/plant/equipment – mining/mineral processing, weir, railway station, shed – goods, bank, residential accommodation – manager's house/quarters, office/administration building, mill, workshop

Irvinebank State Treatment Works is a heritage-listed refinery off Jessie Street, Irvinebank, Shire of Mareeba, Queensland, Australia. It was built from 1883 to c. 1908. It is also known as Loudoun Mill. It was added to the Queensland Heritage Register on 21 October 1992.

== History ==
Tin had been discovered in 1882 at Gibbs Camp, 16 kilometres (9.9 mi) west of Watsonville by a party of Herberton prospectors. The best lode was the Great Southern assaying 60% tin. After persevering for further months without a crushing the miners were eager to sell their properties to capitalists prepared to erect machinery.

The Gibbs Creek properties were purchased in October 1883 on behalf of the Glen Smelting Company for £6,000 cash. John Moffat, the major shareholder, was the mining entrepreneur at Herberton, and this purchase consolidated his investments and determined his future influence in North Queensland tin mining.

The Glen Smelting Company immediately commenced building smelters at Gibbs Creek which Moffat renamed Irvinebank after his birthplace in Scotland. The site chosen for the mill was on an evenly sloping tongue of land between Gibbs and McDonald's Creeks where a "log crate" or pig sty walled dam was constructed to provide water for the concentrating mill. Moffat purchased a five head battery lying idle at Thompson's Creek, 14 kilometres (8.7 mi) away and re-erected it above the Irvinebank Dam. Kerr believes that it was very likely the first Australian battery using a continuous flow system of concentration. There were six terraces on the hillside. One was fed automatically from the tramway hoppers to the stamps. Between the second and fifth floors were the jiggers and Cornish buddles slowly rotated by a 6-metre (20 ft) diameter water wheel. Below were settling tanks and a driver. In February 1989 Moffat built a high-set house (Loudoun House) for himself with an office underneath and a wide front verandah overlooking the dam.

The battery and smelter commenced operations in December 1884 and was called the Loudoun mill, after Moffat's Scottish family. The mill was valued at £12,000 and was managed by George McTavish, who had been a floor manager at the Tent Hill smelters and Stanthorpe. In its first year of operation the Loudoun mill crushed 3,840 long tons (3,900 t) of ore for a yield of 651 long tons (661 t) of black tin which returned 438 long tons (445 t) of metallic tin after smelting.

The development of tin mining on the Atherton Tablelands was controlled by the capacity of the Loudon mill and its crushing charges. Extra five heads of stamps were added in 1886, 1893, 1899 and extra 10 heads in both 1901 and 1904 in conjunction with smelting expansion. Tin separation facilities were improved in 1888, 1893, 1900, 1902 and 1904 to compete with Stannary Hills. By then the value of the mill had risen to £40,000.

Moffat gained a reputation for medieval technology and although frue vanners were installed in 1890, he was slow to upgrade machinery. The skyline changed with an extra chimney in 1903 and more in 1905 and 1906. The Krupp ball mill was replaced in 1908 (Kerr, 1992,3). L. C. Ball, Government Geologist, visited the treatment works in 1909 and described the processes. He noted the poor arrangement of the 40 head stamper battery and the high consumption of steam. He also noted that it was "the chief tin-mining centre of Queensland".

At its peak this was the largest tin battery and smelter in Australia. It was reached by the narrow gauge Stannary Hills tramway from Boonmoo siding on the Chillagoe Railway. Moffat was involved in many other Tableland mines but the Irvinebank mines were his mainstays even though the Vulcan Mine ore halved in value in 1907. He later developed the nearby Governor Norman mine, which yielded £61,480 worth of tin between 1905 and 1914.

Declining assays, falling tin prices and rising overdrafts led to the demise of the Irvinebank Mining Company; the Queensland National Bank forced him to retire as a Director in 1912 in favour of J. S. Reid. The rationalisation program of his mines worsened industrial relations. World War I dispersed the mining population and the collapse of the European market in 1914 forced the closure of the works.

Reid liquidated the Irvinebank Mining Company in 1919 and Queensland Premier Edward Theodore who, as a former miner, had formed the Amalgamated Workers Association in Irvinebank, bought the Loudoun Mill, tramway, aerial ropeways and various mines for £22,500 as a State Enterprise on 25 October 1919. Suction gas replaced the ancient steam power plant.

In 1929 the works were handed over to the Whitworth Finance and Mining Corporation Limited as a private enterprise. Its failure during the Depression demoralised the local tin industry. The smelters were dismantled and the chimney stacks blown down. As ore supplies dwindled the Loudoun mill was barely a ghost of the Irvinebank Mining Company's glory.

In May 1934, when Charles Edford became manager, the mill was substantially as it was in 1919. With Mines Department support he modernised it in 1935 installing Isbel vanners, a rod mill and additional circuits to extract tin concentrates after each stage of the crushing to reduce tin sliming. In 1951 Diester Overstrom tables were introduced after Alf Hooley, an experienced manager from Kidston and Chillagoe took over. Throughout the 1950s the State Government injected £5,000 per year into the town for electricity, housing and additional milling plant. The stamps were finally abandoned in 1966 and today the mill operates with gyratory crushers, rod and ball mills, vibrating screens and Wilfley tables.

In 1981 the State Government announced the inevitable - the decision to transfer the treatment works, the last of the State Enterprises established by Premier Theodore. Since July 1983 the works been operated by the Hilla family. The Irvinebank State Treatment Works (Sale and Operation) Act 1990 sets out obligations and responsibilities for continuing operation of the works.

== Description ==
The place covers an area along the base of a spur running down to the junction of Gibbs and MacDonald creeks in the centre of Irvinebank township. The area forms a precinct containing a representative range of buildings and structures relating to mineral treatment, railways, residential dwellings and community activities. Structural and archaeological remains exemplify the layout and arrangement of a "state of the art" late 19th century reduction plant showing changes in technology and in the flow of improvement capital.

The focal building is the mill, now an electric powered plant based around a rod mill which continues to treat parcels of local ore. Surviving structures associated with the mill include timber ore bins (no longer in use), a primary crusher, early ball mill and blast furnace foundations, boiler house and chimney foundations, a workshop and a carpenters shop.

Three significant buildings on the northern edge of the precinct include the School of Arts Hall - a weatherboard building used as a community hall, the former Queensland National Bank - a brick building now used as a residence, and Moffatt's former house and office (Loudoun House) - a group of weatherboard buildings; the house now used as a museum.

The railway station and large goods shed remain intact. The railway formation and engine shed foundations are evident. The early smelter works and assay office are now mainly surface archaeological structures following their demolition and subsequent erosion. A pig sty log weir with stone and concrete infill continues to dam Gibbs and MacDonald creeks.

Surviving plant includes:

- 2 Rod mills
- 2 Wilfley tables
- Jaw crusher
- Retort/furnace
- Frue vanner
- Four-Cylinder oil engine
- Lathes and workshop plant
- Concentrating and drying plant

== Heritage listing ==
Irvinebank State Treatment Works was listed on the Queensland Heritage Register on 21 October 1992 having satisfied the following criteria.

The place is important in demonstrating the evolution or pattern of Queensland's history.

The Loudoun mill, known as the Irvinebank State Treatment Works from 1912 to 1983, is highly significant in Queensland's history. Mining entrepreneur John Moffat, based at Irvinebank, created an empire in the Cairns hinterland which exported metals valued at £4 million over 25 years. The mill and treatment works have provided the focus of Irvinebank township and sustained it economically and socially since 1884.

The place demonstrates rare, uncommon or endangered aspects of Queensland's cultural heritage.

They are one of the few surviving mining complexes established as State Enterprises by the Ryan/Theodore Labor Government.

Such a mill is rare in Australia and in North Queensland where it is only rivalled by the Emuford battery.

The place has potential to yield information that will contribute to an understanding of Queensland's history.

The complex of mill buildings and machinery has potential to provide further information about the development of tin concentrating technology and mining and metallurgical engineering in Queensland. Although the stamps and boilers do not remain, some of the ore bins timberwork and tramway formation date from 1884. Remnants of the blast furnace flue, brick chimney base, smelter retaining wall and assay office remain.

The place is important in demonstrating a high degree of creative or technical achievement at a particular period.

The mill illustrates the history of tin mining technology in North Queensland from its inception in 1880 to the present. Plant, machinery parts and foundations remain in the mill and have the potential to interpret the full range of processes and technologies used at the mill during its 110 years.

The place has a special association with the life or work of a particular person, group or organisation of importance in Queensland's history.

The mill has a special association with John Moffat, who operated it from 1884 until 1912, as owner and general manager of the Irvinebank Mining Company. He was a regional entrepreneur who controlled and developed North Queensland from 1880 to 1918 by establishing mines, constructing mills, towns, tramways, roads and public buildings.
