= Rocky Bluff Battery and Township =

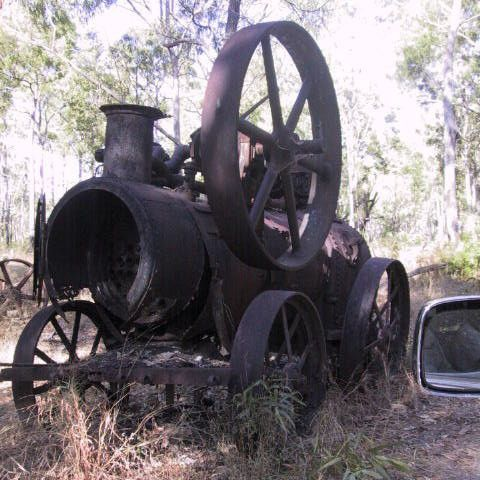
- Remains of Rocky Bluff Battery

- Location within Queensland Location within Australia
- 17.3074°S 145.2651°E
- Location: Watsonville, Shire of Mareeba, Queensland, Australia

History
- Design period: 1900–1914 (early 20th century)
- Built: 1902–c. 1926

Queensland Heritage Register
- Official name: Rocky Bluff Battery and Township, Stannary Hills Mill
- Type: state heritage (built, archaeological)
- Designated: 13 December 2002
- Reference no.: 601861
- Significant period: 1902–c. 1926 (fabric); 1902–1911, 1912–c. 1926 (historical)
- Significant components: chimney/chimney stack, furnace, embankment – tramway, weir, mounting block/stand, flue, wall/s – retaining, ropeway, tank – precipitation, terracing, fire box

Rocky Bluff Battery and Township is a heritage-listed former mining town at Watsonville, Shire of Mareeba, Queensland, Australia. It was built from 1902 to c. 1926. It is also known as Stannary Hills Mill. It was added to the Queensland Heritage Register on 13 December 2002.

== History ==
Tin was discovered in the Rocky Bluff district in 1883 but initially little development occurred. Extensive leases were acquired over the area by a South Australian company, the North Queensland Tin Mining Corporation, in 1900. The company passed the properties and fixed assets to the Stannary Hills Mines and Tramway Company Limited, an Adelaide-based company with a nominated capital of £650,000. This company took advantage of the tramway clause in the Mining Act of 1898 and commenced surveys for a narrow gauge tramway from Boonmoo, along Eureka Creek to Stannary Hills, thence over the ridge to a terminus at Watsonville.

The line opened to Stannary Hills in May 1902. Instead of proceeding to Watsonville it was decided to construct a branch line 11 kilometres (6.8 mi) to Rocky Bluff on the Walsh River and this opened on 18 November 1902.

The battery was constructed in 1902 on a machine area of 4 hectares beside the Walsh River. Sand and gravel had to be carted uphill from the river. Bricks were carted in on the Stannary Hills tramway and then lowered on a rope tramway 190 metres (620 ft) down the hill to the battery site. The battery was formally opened on 6 May 1903. Named "Jumping Moses", the 20 head battery, Huntington mill and Merton furnace were perched high on the steep hillside above the river.

The battery closed in June 1903 because the mortar box shifted and there was insufficient boiler power. The general manager, Charles S. Pasley, reported that the battery could only work at half power until the boiler was replaced by a larger one; £600 was to be spent on two frue vanners, two wheeler pans and a small four compartment jigger.

In 1905 new stamper foundations and storage bins were constructed, a further 10 head stamps were added and the old 20 head were replaced. New rolls were put in between rockbreaker and battery, and a travelling "grizzly" to take the crushed ore with the roughs taken out on a moving elevator. A Krupp ball mill reground the coarser parts of the battery pulp. All the pumps were replaced by new return pumps throughout the mill. The bases of the vanners were built in and the brickwork of the Merton furnace was repaired and relined. A slime buddle was also put in to deal more efficiently with the overflow slimes. The gravitation water supply was brought by wooden fluming about 2 kilometres (1.2 mi) up the river, except at times of reduced flow, when a system of pumping from, and returning to a dam in the river was resorted to. Motive power for the battery was supplied by a 350 hp Robey compound engine and for the dressing plant by a 30 hp high- pressure engine, steam being generated in Babcock and Wilcox boilers.

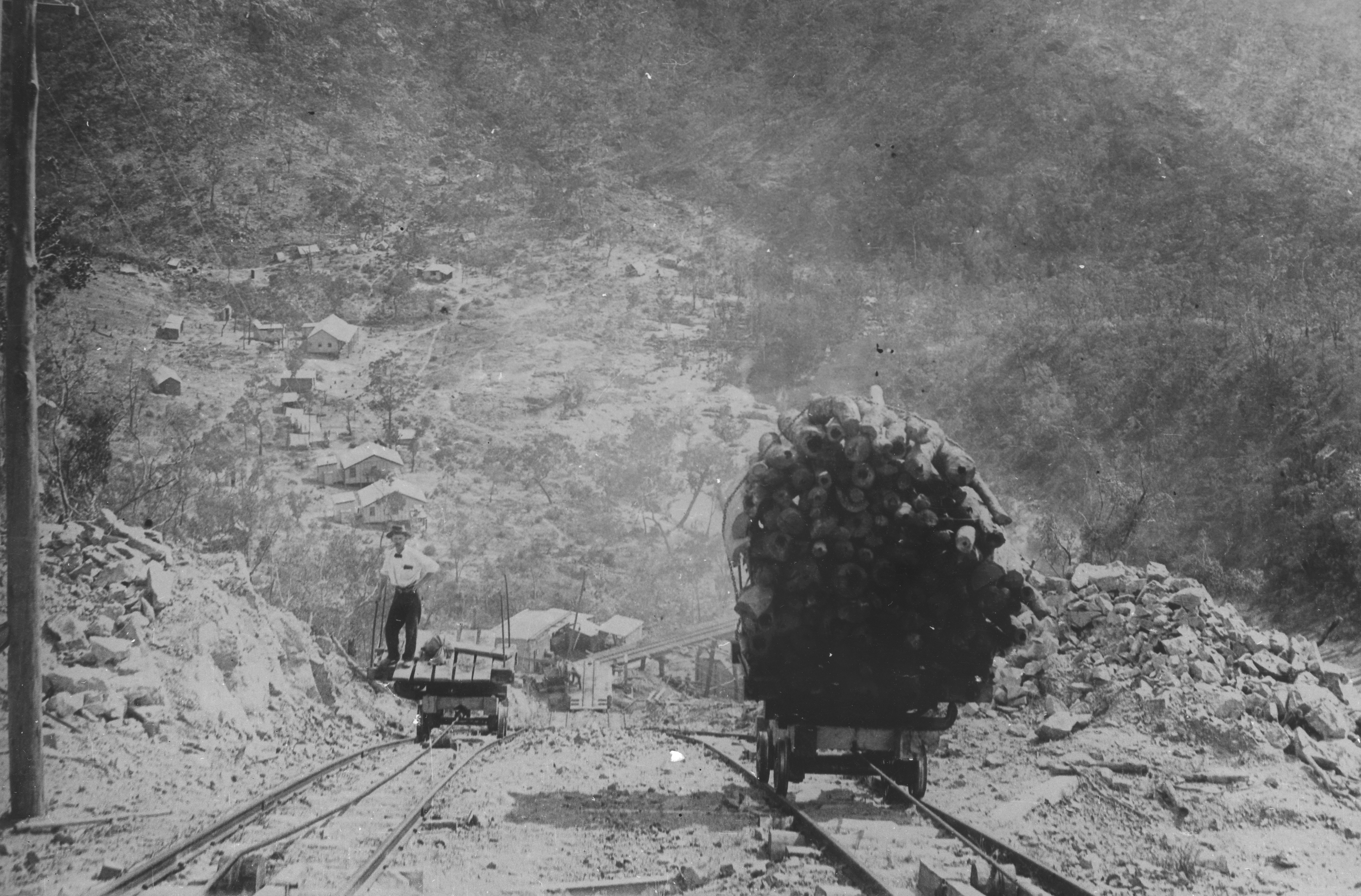
Rocky Bluff Battery, circa 1905

In 1905 the small township of Rocky Bluffs had "some 200 inhabitants and ... a good hotel, store and provisional school". The battery supplied electricity to the school and some of the principal buildings in the township. The township was also reticulated from the gravitational water supply.

Because of its steep site the township had the reputation that no wheeled vehicle, cart, wagon or buggy ever got into its main streets. A postal receiving office operated from 1903 to 1907. The battery and general work at Rocky Bluffs, the terminus of the Stannary Hills tramline, gave employment to about 50 men in 1905. Ore was shipped in from surrounding mines, such as the Arbouin, which was connected by an aerial ropeway to the tramline, the Ivanhoe, Extended, Kitchener and Eclipse mines.

The Stannary Hills Company spent £120,000 in three years on tramways, plant and buildings, and mine development. The company was highly successful while tin prices remained high, but after the collapse of the market in late 1907 its influence declined. Between 1904 and 1911, when the company closed down output was valued at £275,352.

John Darling and Company, a South Australian company, bought the assets of the liquidated Stannary Hills Tramway and Tin Mines Limited and undertook extensive repairs in 1912 to reopen the battery. The battery was renovated in 1917. It reopened with one shift per day in the latter half of 1918 and operated into the mid 1920s. The tramway from the Junction to Rocky Bluff was dismantled in 1926.

== Description ==
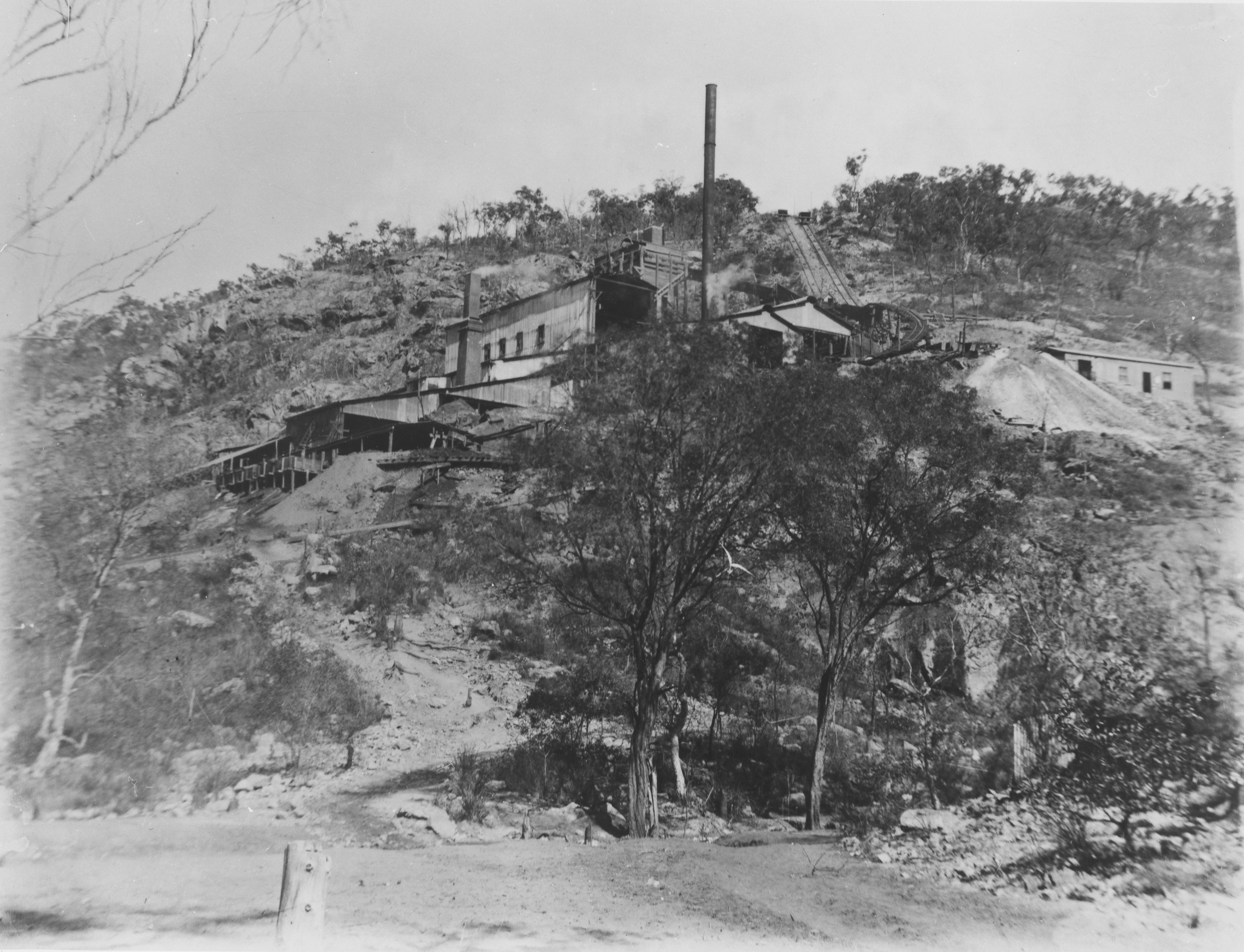
Rocky Bluffs Crushing Mill, circa 1909

The place comprises a number of components including the formation and terminus structures of the Stannary Hills - Rocky Bluff tramway: a ropeway formation descending from the tramway to the battery including concrete brake mounts; and foundations of the battery including terraced benches and high retaining walls descending steeply to the Walsh River; an intact stone weir across the river; and two township areas, one on the river flat and the other in the gully below the battery.

The battery comprises four main terraced levels separated with high rock-face retaining walls. The crusher level includes sections of brick walls and flues of a two-unit Babcock boiler house, the substantial brick base of a metal chimney and concrete engine mounts. Adjacent are three pairs of concrete foundations for 30 head of stamps. The battery floor contains three circular brick bases for large agitator vats, and an intact square brick chimney associated with an arrangement of brick precipitation tanks. A furnace floor, below, contains the brick remains of a Merton furnace with flues connecting to the base of the chimney. This area also contains a small retort consisting of an iron furnace and brick firebox. Three circular concrete rendered brick buddle bases for the treatment of slimes are located on a lower level.

Evidence of structures at the settlement sites is minimal and includes timber stumps, rock walls and a dump of green beer bottles marking a hotel or store site. A section of steel chimney has been dumped on the settlement site. A small stone building survives in the vicinity of the settlement.

== Heritage listing ==
Rocky Bluff Battery and Township was listed on the Queensland Heritage Register on 13 December 2002 having satisfied the following criteria.

The place is important in demonstrating the evolution or pattern of Queensland's history.

The Rocky Bluff battery, tramway and township are significant as an expression of early integrated development in North Queensland's mining industry.

The place demonstrates rare, uncommon or endangered aspects of Queensland's cultural heritage.

The combination of functions in one place is unique: steam tramway and terminus, rope incline tramway, battery, weir and settlement. The battery of 30 head was one of the largest to operate in the Mareeba district. The brick chimney and Merton furnace (though partly demolished), are a rare combination. The place is one of the few battery sites in Queensland with a brick chimney remaining.

The place is important in demonstrating the principal characteristics of a particular class of cultural places.

Due to difficult access the place retains comprehensive evidence of the layout of a range of representative late 19th century haulage, concentrating and settlement features. The battery layout still clearly demonstrates treatment processes through its surviving structures and surface archaeology.

The place is important because of its aesthetic significance.

The battery site was selected for efficient operation above the Walsh River and the mountain and river setting is very impressive containing historic landscape values.

== See also ==
- List of tramways in Queensland
