= Irvinebank =

- Town
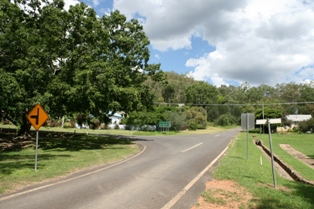

- Interactive map of Irvinebank
- Coordinates: 17.4275°S 145.2050°E
- Country: Australia
- State: Queensland
- LGA: Shire of Mareeba
- Location: 25.8 km (16.0 mi) WSW of Herberton; 45.2 km (28.1 mi) S of Atherton; 77.9 km (48.4 mi) SSW of Mareeba; 122 km (76 mi) SW of Cairns; 1,708 km (1,061 mi) NNW of Brisbane

Government
  - State electorate: Hill
  - Federal division: Kennedy

Area
  - Total: 740.1 km^{2} (285.8 sq mi)
- Elevation: 750 m (2,460 ft)

Population
  - Total: 113 (2021 census)
  - Density: 0.1527/km^{2} (0.3954/sq mi)
- Time zone: UTC+10:00 (AEST)
- Postcode: 4887
Localities around Irvinebank
Dimbulah	Mutchilba	Watsonville
Petford	Irvinebank	Silver Valley
Munderra	Mount Garnet	Silver Valley

Irvinebank is a rural town and locality in the Shire of Mareeba, Queensland, Australia. In the 2021 census, the locality of Irvinebank had a population of 113 people.

== Geography ==
The Great Dividing Range forms the south-eastern and southern boundary of the locality.

Irvinebank is in the western foothills of the Atherton Tablelands of Far North Queensland, 123 kilometres (76 mi) south-west of Cairns via the Bruce Highway, Gillies Range Road, State Route 25 (bypassing Atherton) and the Herberton Petford Road. From further west it can be accessed from the Burke Developmental Road at Petford.

The terrain is generally mountainous with the following named peaks:

- Billing Knob (17.4553°S 145.0053°E) 805 metres (2,641 ft)
- Boot Hill (17.5322°S 145.1034°E) 894 metres (2,933 ft)
- Elizabeth Bluffs (17.4292°S 145.0889°E)
- Geebung Hill (17.5570°S 145.0752°E) 896 metres (2,940 ft)
- Giblets Peak (17.4653°S 145.1085°E) 912 metres (2,992 ft)
- Hermit Hill (17.4321°S 144.9539°E) 886 metres (2,907 ft)
- Iron Mountain (17.5234°S 145.0338°E) 886 metres (2,907 ft)
- Lead Hill (17.5227°S 145.0453°E) 866 metres (2,841 ft)
- Mount Babinda (17.4413°S 145.0665°E) 827 metres (2,713 ft)
- Mount Gossan (17.4595°S 145.0819°E) 883 metres (2,897 ft)
- Mount Luxton (17.5233°S 144.9964°E)
- Mount Misery (17.4688°S 145.2294°E) 1,070 metres (3,510 ft)

== History ==
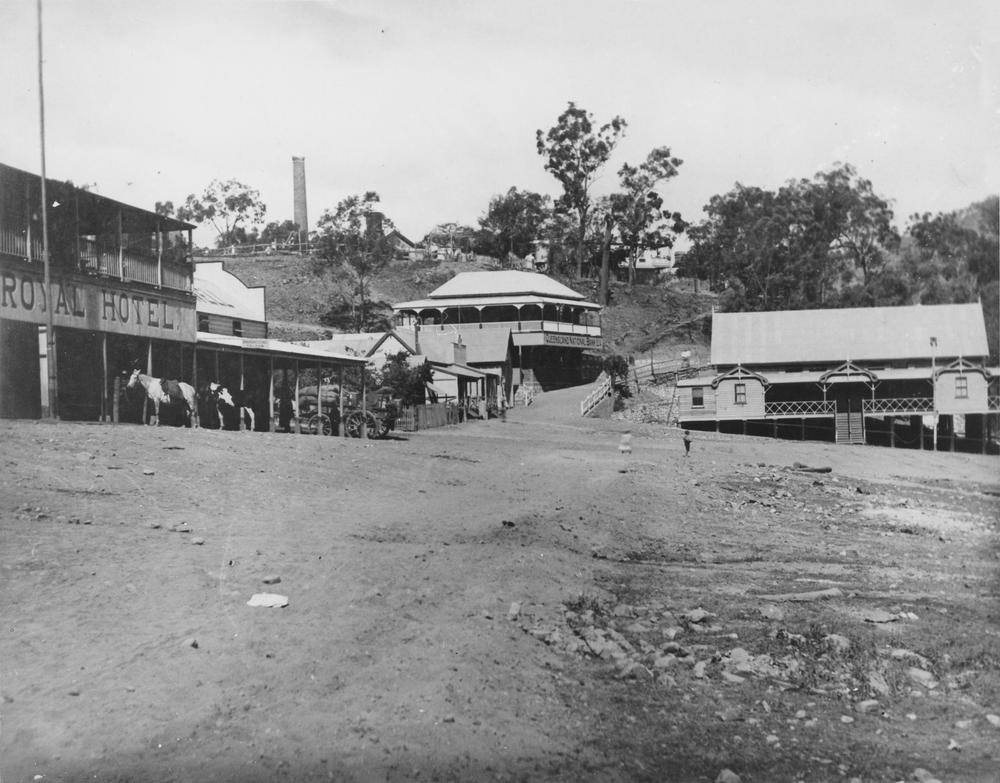
Irvinebank with Wades Royal Hotel, National Bank, School of Arts and other buildings, circa 1906

First known as Gibbs Camp, the town was founded in 1884 by John Moffat, who had purchased the mining leases from the original prospectors. From 1889 he owned the Vulcan tin mine. He built a dam, a mill, smelters and other infrastructure that attracted settlers and miners to the area. Moffat was born at Newmilns, Ayrshire, Scotland, which is situated on the River Irvine, and it is assumed he named the town Irvinebank in honour of his home town. Irvinebank became a thriving town with an economy based on mining, milling and smelting.

In late 1884, Irvinebank became famous for a massacre of Aboriginal Australians and a subsequent inquiry. In October of that year a Native Police patrol led by officers William Nichols and Roland Garraway conducted a series of raids in the area during which an Aboriginal camp was fired upon. An old man, two women and a 6-year-old child were killed. Another two Aboriginal men were arrested, never to be seen again. John Moffat alerted authorities and an investigation was held. Seven troopers were later charged with murder and Sub-inspector Nichols was charged with being an accessory. At a trial in Townsville the magistrate concluded there was no case against Nichols and he was discharged "amid considerable applause". The troopers were remanded in custody and in October 1885 they too were discharged. Nichols, however, was dismissed from the Native Police by the Queensland government and the Irvinebank massacre is regarded as a turning point away from the policy of indiscriminate killing of Indigenous people in the colony.

Irvinebank Post Office opened on 1 June 1885 (a receiving office had been open from 1884).

Irvinebank Provisional School opened on 27 September 1886. On 1 August 1890 it became Irvinebank State School.

Montalbion State School opened c. 1888 and closed in 1906.

Stannary Hills Provisional School opened on 18 January 1904. In 1907, it became Stannary Hills State School. It closed c. 1931.

Rocky Bluffs Provisional School opened in 1904 and closed in 1910.

Gurrumba Provisional School opened in 1907. On 1 January 1909, it became Gurrumba Provisional School. It closed c. 1916.

Hale's Siding Provisional School opened on 22 February 1915 and closed in February 1922.

Although currently and historically within the Shire of Mareeba, between 2008 and 2013, the Shire of Mareeba (and hence Invinebank) was within the Tablelands Region) until 2014 when the shire was re-instated following a vote by the residents.

== Demographics ==
In the ten years up to the 1911 census the population had swelled from 619 to 1264, but another 10 years saw it reduced back to only 607 and continued to fall.

In the 2006 census, Irvinebank had a population of 311 people.

In the 2016 census, the locality of Irvinebank had a population of 125 people.

In the 2021 census, the locality of Irvinebank had a population of 113 people.

== Heritage listings ==
Irvinebank has a number of heritage-listed sites, including:

- Irvinebank State School, High Street (17.4265°S 145.2044°E)
- Queensland National Bank, Jessie Street (17.4287°S 145.2047°E)
- Irvinebank State Treatment Works, off Jessie Street (17.4298°S 145.2025°E)
- Loudoun House, 16 O'Callaghan Street (17.4289°S 145.2045°E)
- Vulcan Mine, Mareeba Mining District (17.4266°S 145.1962°E)
- Irvinebank School of Arts Hall, McDonald Street (17.4285°S 145.2044°E)
- Stannary Hills Tramways, Stannary Hills-Irvinebank Road (17.3297°S 145.1618°E)

== Education ==
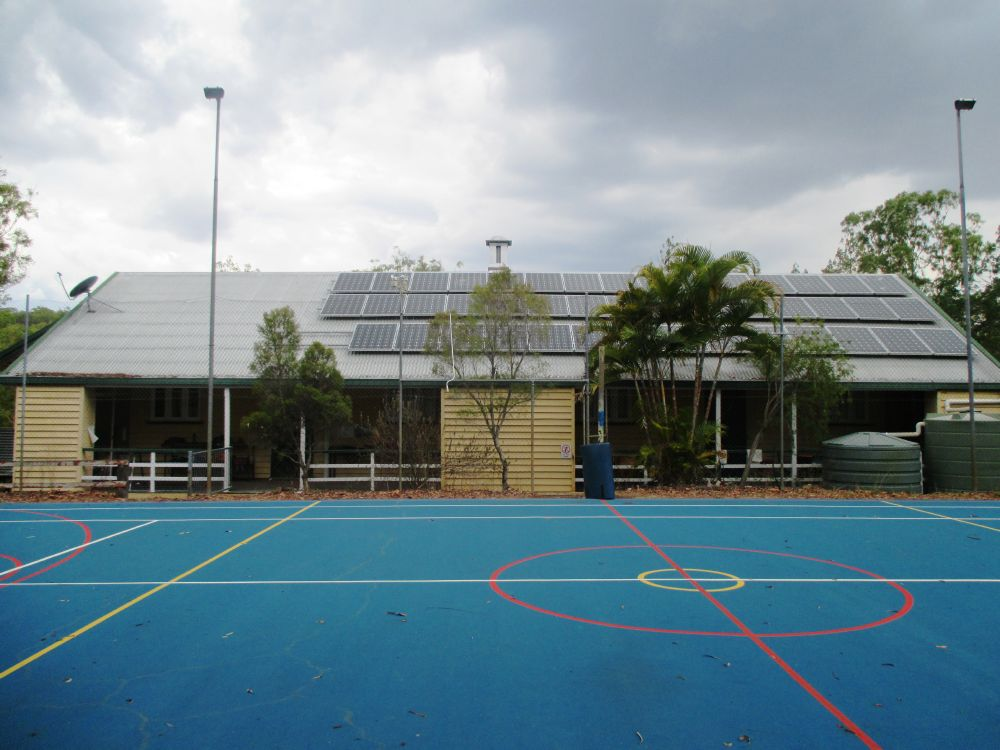
Irvinebank State School, 2014

Irvinebank State School is a government primary (Prep–6) school for boys and girls at High Street (17.4268°S 145.2041°E). In 2018, the school had an enrolment of 9 students with 2 teachers (1 full-time equivalent) and 4 non-teaching staff (1 full-time equivalent).

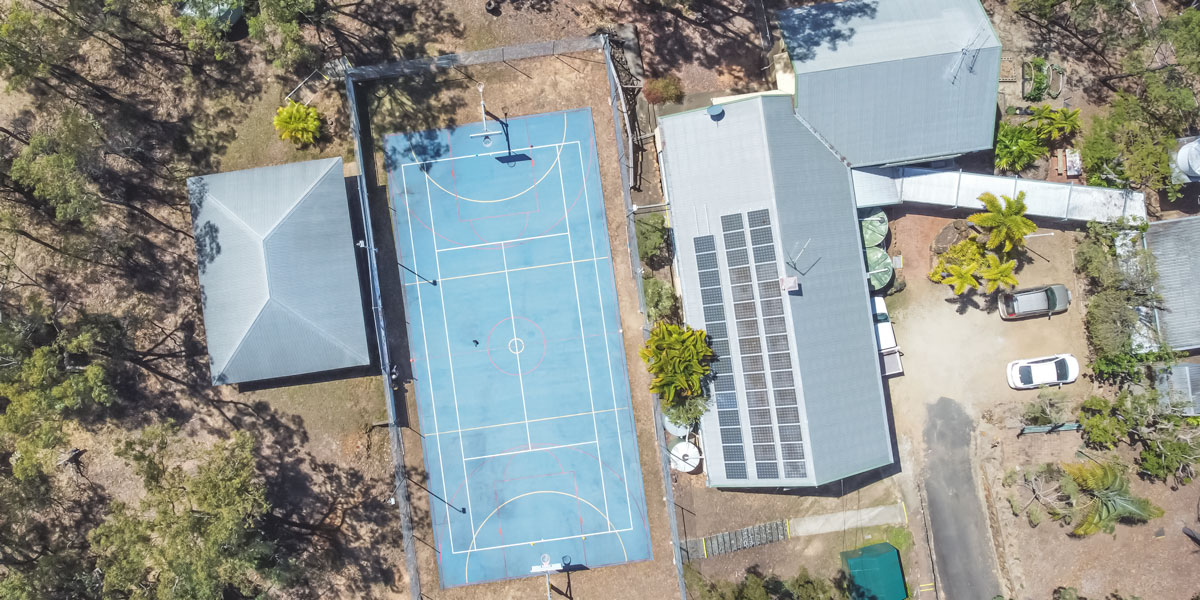
Aerial view of Irvinebank State School, 2025

There are no secondary schools in Irvinebank. The nearest government secondary schools are Dimbulah State School (to Year 10) in neighbouring Dimbulah to the north-west and Herberton State School (to Year 10) in Herberton to the east. Catholic secondary education to Year 12 is available in Herberton, while the nearest government secondary school offering schooling to Year 12 is Atherton State High School in Atherton to the north-east; Given the size of the locality, some children might live too far away to attend any of these schools; distance education and boarding schools would be other options.

== Facilities ==
Irvinebank Post Office is at 16 O'Callaghan Street (17.4287°S 145.2049°E).

Irvinebank Rural Fire Station is on Jessie Street in the town (17.4292°S 145.2054°E).

Irvinebank Cemetery is on Cemetery Road off the Herberton Petford Road just to the south-west of the town (17.4333°S 145.1944°E).

Montalbion Pioneer Cemetery is in the former town of Montalbion along a signed dirt track off the Herberton Petford Road (17.4051°S 145.1539°E). It is no longer open for burials.

== Amenities ==
Irvinebank School of Arts is a public hall at 2633 Herberton Petford Road (17.4285°S 145.2047°E). There are a number of monuments and memorials there, including:

- a cairn with memorial to John Moffat and his secretary and town historian Allan Ferguson Waddell, erected by the Royal Geographical Society of Queensland
- Irvinebank Roll of Honour, commemorating those from the town who served in World War I

Irvinebank Tavern is at 2656 Herberton Petford Road (17.4278°S 145.2027°E). It provides meals, cabin accommodation and petrol.

== Attractions ==
Loudoun House Museum is at 16 O'Callaghan Street in heritage-listed Loudon House (17.4289°S 145.2045°E). The museum presents the local history of the area and has resources for family history.

== Notable residents ==
- Henry Dalziel, recipient of the Victoria Cross in World War I was born in Irvinebank

== See also ==
- List of tramways in Queensland
