= Vulcan Mine =

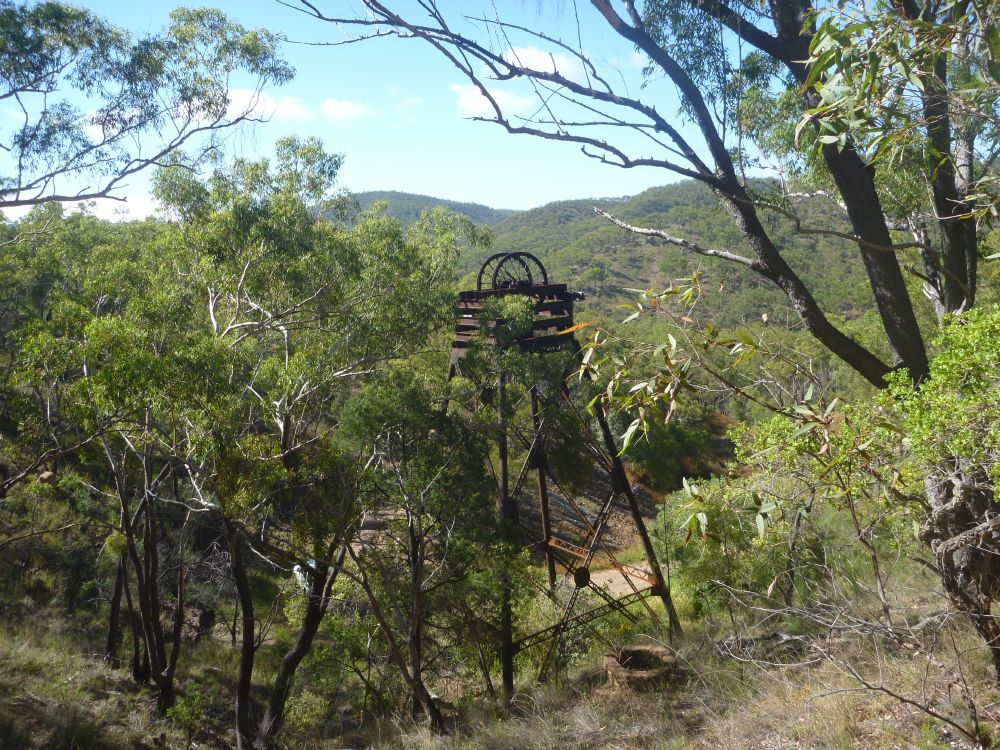
- Vulcan Mine and Headframe, 2015

- Location within Queensland Location within Australia
- 17.4266°S 145.1962°E
- Location: Mareeba Mining District, Irvinebank, Shire of Mareeba, Queensland, Australia

History
- Design period: 1870s–1890s (late 19th century)
- Built: c. 1889–1930s

Queensland Heritage Register
- Official name: Vulcan Mine and Headframe
- Type: state heritage (built, archaeological)
- Designated: 21 October 1992
- Reference no.: 600681
- Significant period: 1889–1930s (fabric, historical)
- Significant components: headframe, shaft, tank – reservoir, adit

Vulcan Mine is a heritage-listed former mine at Mareeba Mining District, Irvinebank, Shire of Mareeba, Queensland, Australia. It was built from c. 1889 to 1930s. It was added to the Queensland Heritage Register on 21 October 1992.

== History ==
The Vulcan tin lode at Irvinebank was discovered in September 1888 by a party of Italian woodcutters and miners – Harry Maranta, Alexander Leone, Battista Leone and Giuseppe Lampatta. Several crushings in 1889 assayed 20% tin. The first few years of Vulcan mine development involved competition between claimholders and John Moffat, whom they feared would take over the mine.

During Moffat's absence from Irvinebank, a syndicate of local miners banded together to purchase the Vulcan mine from the Italians for £2,100 and formed a public company, the Vulcan Tin Mining Company Limited, on 13 December 1890 with a capital of £4,400 in £1 shares paid to ten shillings each. This company was the first joint stock company on the Walsh and Tinaroo fields to pay a dividend, in January 1891.

In order to continue to control the main mines on the field Moffat infiltrated the Vulcan company through nominees and within seven months he controlled 40% of the company's shares. Moffat also sought to amalgamate the Vulcan and Irvinebank Mining Companies. This confrontation and the secretiveness about the Loudoun Mill operating costs and the direction of the Vulcan lodes hampered negotiations for a co-operative operation.

A third company, the Vulcan Tin Mining Company NL was formed on 29 March 1892 and its capital was increased to £44,000. The mine produced well and was the only mine in the district capable of paying wages in the 1890s.

Moffat continued his policy of technical innovation, installing in 1893 a first motion double action winding engine, the first on the Walsh and Tinaroo field. A 40-horsepower (30 kW) Cornish boiler powered the 16-horsepower (12 kW) Tangye winding engines with 1.4-metre (4 ft 7 in) drums on brick foundations and fitted with two 1.8-metre (5 ft 11 in) pully wheels at the base of a 9-metre (30 ft) timber headframe. There were two cages for miners to descend the 92-metre (302 ft) shaft.

Moffat's intervention overcame the operating problems and the Vulcan mine became the staunchest pillar of his empire. Over the next 15 years, the Vulcan yielded 9,000 tons of black tin worth £377,362 and paid dividends totalling £162,030.

A feature of the workings was their depth. By 1903, the Vulcan was being described as one of the deepest mines in the southern hemisphere, as well as being called "the premier lode tin mine of Queensland". In 1905 the shaft was over 305 metres (1,001 ft) in depth and the winding engine could not pull up the ore from the deepest level, so a new engine was ordered from Walker's foundry in Maryborough. It was a first motion winding engine of a nominal 100 hp, capable of winding ore from 610 metres (2,000 ft).

The wooden headframe was replaced by a steel headframe 18.3 metres (60 ft) high between 1903 and 1912, according to photographic evidence.

During 1907 the ore from the seemingly inexhaustible Vulcan mine almost halved in assay value coupled with strikes and falling tin prices, the prospects of the Vulcan company dimmed and dissension among managers and miners was rife. Moffat maintained an aloof stance. Because it paid out so much of its profits in dividends, the Vulcan company was considered as a small man's company in which the local working miner could own a small parcel of shares and participate in North Queensland's mining wealth. Unfortunately for Irvinebank miners the output of the Vulcan mine fell in the period from 1905 to the outbreak of World War I from an average assay of 10.2% to 4% and the value of tin output dropped from £61,618 to £12,805, an alarming drop due both to declining tin prices and to poorer ore at the 366-metre (1,201 ft) level.

The 1907 and 1908 strikes seriously affected the value of the Vulcan ore in relation to its chief competitor on the field, the Stannary Hills Company operating the nearby Rocky Bluff battery. But because of Moffat's established monopoly of the field, the Vulcan company was able to continue production whereas the Stannary Hills company was forced to close the Rocky Bluff battery after 1909 and rail its ore to Irvinebank.

In 1913 an aerial tramway was installed from the mine to the Loudoun mill. Improved facilities for travelling between the surface and the working faces were installed in 1915 when the mine was down 445 metres (1,460 ft). Production improved by 1918 to 934 tons of tin ore for a return of 26.5 tons of concentrates valued at £4,350 but no dividends were paid for the third year running.

Fresh chimney stacks replaced the corroded ones at the mine in 1921. The Whitworth Finance and Mining Corporation Limited employed over a dozen men renovating the surface plant at the Vulcan in early May 1929 prior to commencing dewatering operations. This included the placing of a new collar set in position above the shaft.

This implies that the mine had not operated for some years previously. The Whitworth Corporation failed and presumably the mine closed from the early 1930s.

North Broken Hill Limited applied for 60ha lease over the old Vulcan workings in 1947, but in 1981 Don Walker of Herberton purchased the mine which is not operational but it has become a local tourist site.

== Description ==
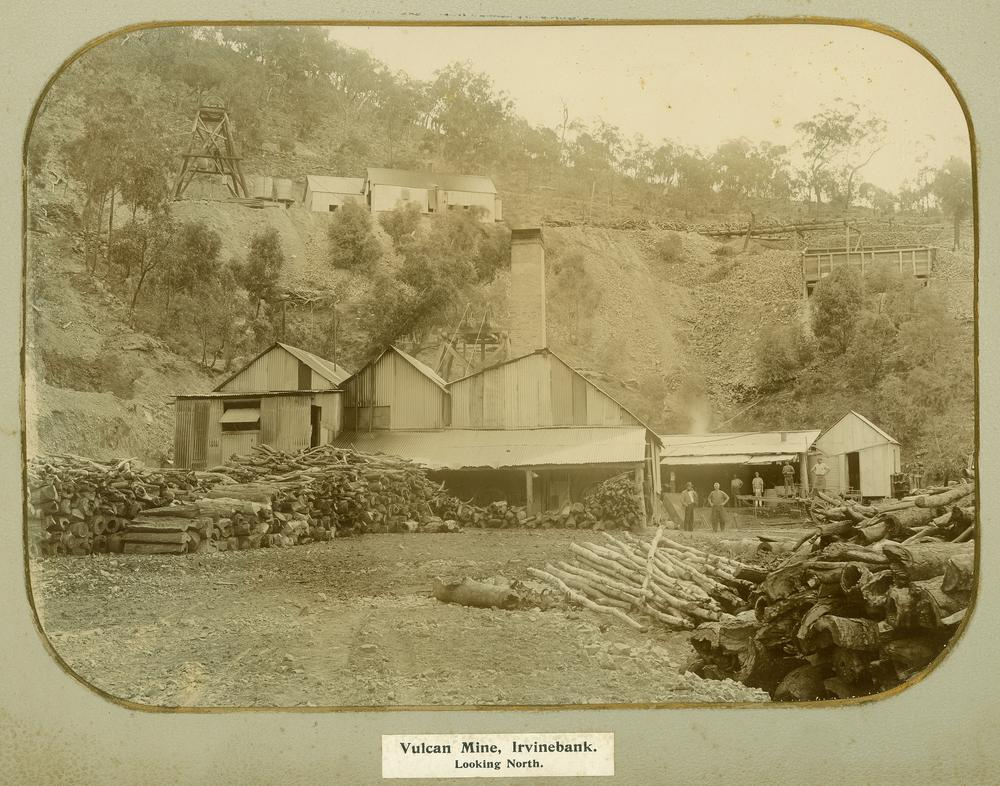
Vulcan tin mine, 1904

The mine and machinery foundations are situated on a narrow bench excavated into a steep hillside at the head of a gully running down to Gibbs Creek. The dominant structure is a steel headframe over the Vulcan shaft. Brickwork footings of the former boiler house and chimney are located immediately south of the headframe. Alongside are stone and brick foundations for a pump and air compressor. Immediately south again are large concrete foundations for a winding engine containing a relief inscription reading - Vulcan T M Co. 1906. Nearby are further boiler foundations connecting with the remains of a brick flue

A beehive brick below-ground tank is constructed into the hill above the headframe. Near the base of the tank is an adit which continues through the hill to connect with an open stope. The Tornado Mine winding and pump engine foundations are located on the hillside above and to the north of the Vulcan.

The surviving plant includes the steel headframe (base plate inscribed) - Engineering Supply Co of Aust Ltd Brisbane.

== Heritage listing ==
Vulcan Mine was listed on the Queensland Heritage Register on 21 October 1992 having satisfied the following criteria.

The place is important in demonstrating the evolution or pattern of Queensland's history.

The Vulcan mine and its headframe is significant in Queensland's history for its development as a local shareholders mine which supplied ore to the main battery, the Loudoun mill, in Irvinebank. It was the most productive tin mine in North Queensland.

The place demonstrates rare, uncommon or endangered aspects of Queensland's cultural heritage.

This steel headframe is one of very few dating from before World War I and still standing on its original site. A beehive brick covered underground water tank above the mine is now rare in the North Queensland context.

The place is important in demonstrating a high degree of creative or technical achievement at a particular period.

It is Australia's deepest tin mine (at 464 metres (1,522 ft)) and has one of the largest headframes still remaining.

The place has a strong or special association with a particular community or cultural group for social, cultural or spiritual reasons.

Early development of the mine was associated with Italian miners. There were major strikes in the Vulcan and nearby mines in 1907 which were catalysts of change in Irvinebank mine management practices. The place has some importance in the history of the Labor movement.

The place has a special association with the life or work of a particular person, group or organisation of importance in Queensland's history.

The mine is also associated with William McCormack and Edward Theodore, later Queensland Premier and Queensland and Australian Treasurer, who came to Irvinebank as an underground miner in the Vulcan mine and established the Amalgamated Workers Association (later amalgamating with the Australian Workers Union).
