= Stannary Hills Tramways =

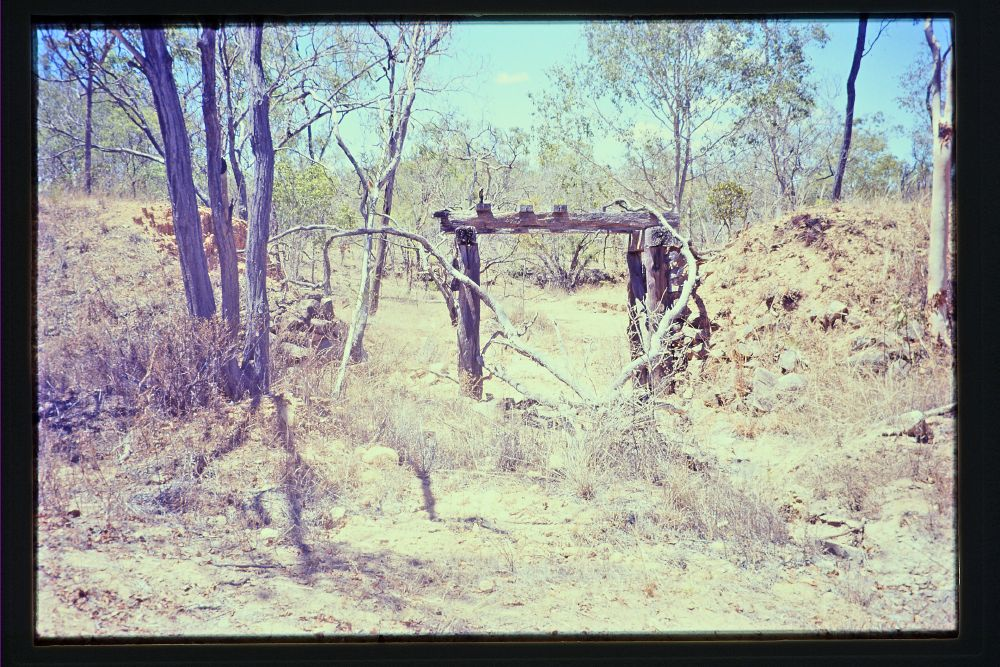
- Tramway remains, 2003

- Location within Queensland Location within Australia
- 17.3297°S 145.1618°E
- Location: Irvinebank, Shire of Mareeba, Queensland, Australia

History
- Design period: 1900–1914 (early 20th century)
- Built: 1901–1907

Queensland Heritage Register
- Official name: Stannary Hills to Boonmoo and Stannary Hills to Irvinebank Tramway formations
- Type: state heritage (archaeological)
- Designated: 25 February 2005
- Reference no.: 602355
- Significant period: 1901–1907 (fabric); 1902–1936 (historical)
- Significant components: objects (movable) – mining/mineral processing, trees/plantings, weir, embankment – tramway, mounting block/stand, pole/s – telegraph, wall/s – retaining

Stannary Hills Tramways are a heritage-listed pair of tramways at Irvinebank, Shire of Mareeba, Queensland, Australia. It was built from 1901 to 1907. It was added to the Queensland Heritage Register on 25 February 2005.

== History ==
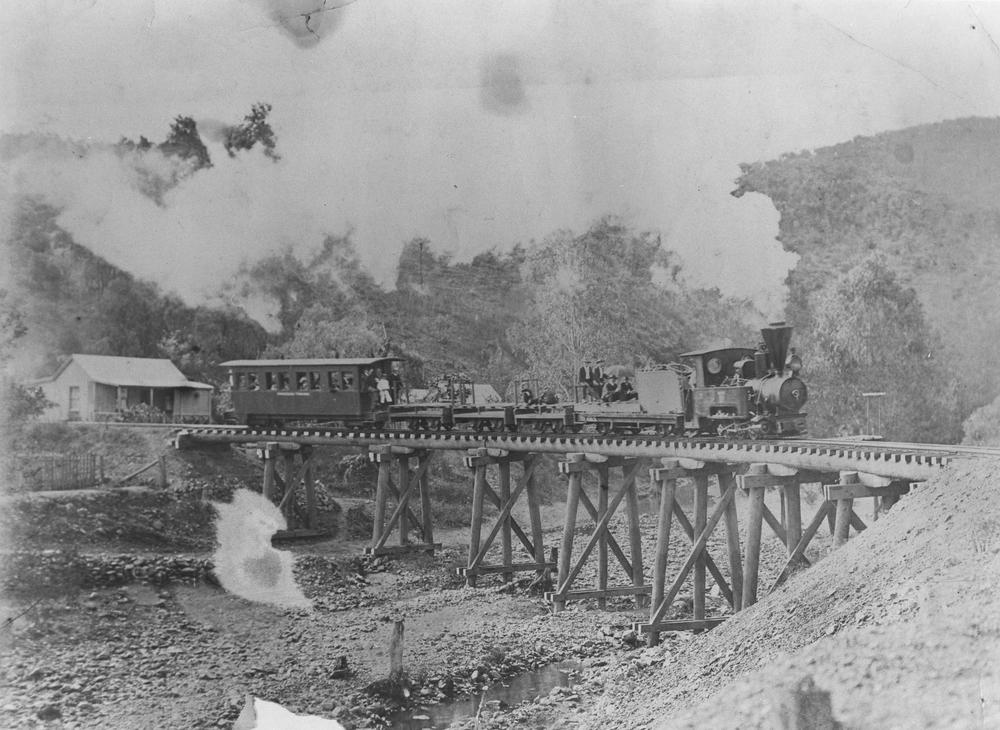
Steam tram crossing Irvinebank bridge over Gibbs Creek, circa 1911

The Boonmoo-to-Stannary Hills and Stannary Hills-to-Irvinebank tramway formations represent two private tramways constructed between 1901 and 1907 that provided transport for the tin mining fields west of the Atherton Tablelands in north Queensland from their construction until 1936. The tramlines are on a 2 feet (0.61 m) gauge, distinct from the standard 3 ft 6 in gauge used on the Queensland government railway of the time. Sleepers and bridge spans were constructed from local timber such as cypress pine, bloodwood and spotted gum. The Boonmoo-to-Stannary Hills section was also known as Dixon's tramway, named after the engineer responsible for the construction of the first tramway.

James Venture Mulligan reported the first tin deposits to the west of Atherton Tablelands in June 1875. Four years later a group of prospectors found tin in the Wild River and pegged the Great Northern Mine in what became the primary township of Herberton. Further tin lodes were found and in 1881 the Great Western Mine opened, followed by Eureka Creek in 1882 and Gibbs Creek in 1883. Prior to the construction of the tramways Cobb and Co provided the only reliable form of transport between the tin mining area west of the Atherton Tableland and the coastal ports of Port Douglas and Cairns. In 1884 the Queensland Government chose Cairns as the coastal terminus for the Tablelands railway to Mareeba across the Great Dividing Range, although the line was not built until 1893. Copper deposits were discovered at Chillagoe/Mungana in 1888 creating renewed calls for increased transport between the coastal ports and the mining areas west of the Atherton Tablelands.

The construction of the 3-foot-6-inch (1.07 m) Cairns to Mungana railway by the Queensland Government in 1893 sparked interest in the Herberton area from a group of Adelaide based mining entrepreneurs. North Queensland Tin Mining Corporation was registered on 20 September 1899 with WH Phillips as chairman and S Dixon as Queensland director. It had capital of £20 000 in £100 shares. The company was particularly interested in the Eureka Creek mines, which had been abandoned by tin workers in the early 1890s due to high transport costs. By October 1900 the company controlled a range of assets including 500 acres of mining leases, 320 acres of freehold, tramway leases, water rights and battery sites at Nigger Creek and Rocky Bluff. The closest siding on the government railway to the Eureka Creek tin fields was Boonmoo, also known as the 35 Mile, at 17°14′48″S 145°04′24″E.

In 1901 North Queensland Tin Mining Corporation was floated to raise the capital to construct the Boonmoo to Stannary Hills tramway. Properties and fixed assets to the Stannary Hills Mines and Tramway Company Limited, an Adelaide-based company with a nominated capital of £650,000. The company was the first to take advantage of the 1900 Amendments to the Mining Act of 1898 which introduced provisions for tramways to carry goods and passengers in addition to mineral traffic, to attract investment in Queensland mining operations. C.T. Stephens was appointed to survey the line and supervise construction of the tramway by Dixon in 1901.

The original line was surveyed from Boonmoo along Eureka Creek to Stannary Hills and terminating at Watsonville. Work began at Boonmoo in early 1901 and reached Stannary Hills in 1902. For several miles construction work offered no major difficulties, but within 4 or 5 miles of Stannary Hills the ranges had to be surmounted, which necessitated cutting around the hills to enable a reasonable grade for the line. After the Boonmoo to Stannary Hills line opened in May 1902, instead of proceeding to Watsonville, it was extended 11 kilometres (6.8 mi) to Rocky Bluff, a battery site on the Walsh River where minerals from the Eureka Creek tin deposits could be processed.

A modern 33 head stamper battery, capable of crushing 100 tons a day, was installed at Rocky Bluff immediately on completion of the line. The battery was known as "Shaking Moses" and was formally opened in May 1903. The tramline finished at the top of a steep incline above the battery. All firewood for the boilers and ore for treatment at the battery were lowered down the inclined tramway with two tracks for a distance of about 600 feet (180 m). Brake control on the trucks was exercised from a platform at the top of the inclined tramway.

Passenger fares were 3 shillings sixpence each way from Stannary Hills to Rocky Bluff and passengers travelled "at their own risk". There were no stations, passengers simply hailed the tram to board it.

Mining entrepreneur of north Queensland, John Moffat, had a strong interest in the transport developments at Stannary Hills. With the commissioning of his second tin smelter, Loudoun Mill at Irvinebank (later to become the Irvinebank State Treatment Works), in the latter part of 1904, it became clear that improved transport was necessary, for firewood, tin from the outer areas and for transporting ores. Firewood was particularly important, as the Loudoun Mill consumed in excess of 100 tonnes a day in its peak and supplies from Irvinebank were dwindling. Moffat decided to build the Stannary Hills-to-Irvinebank tramway, to connect with the Stannary Hills-to-Boonmoo line.

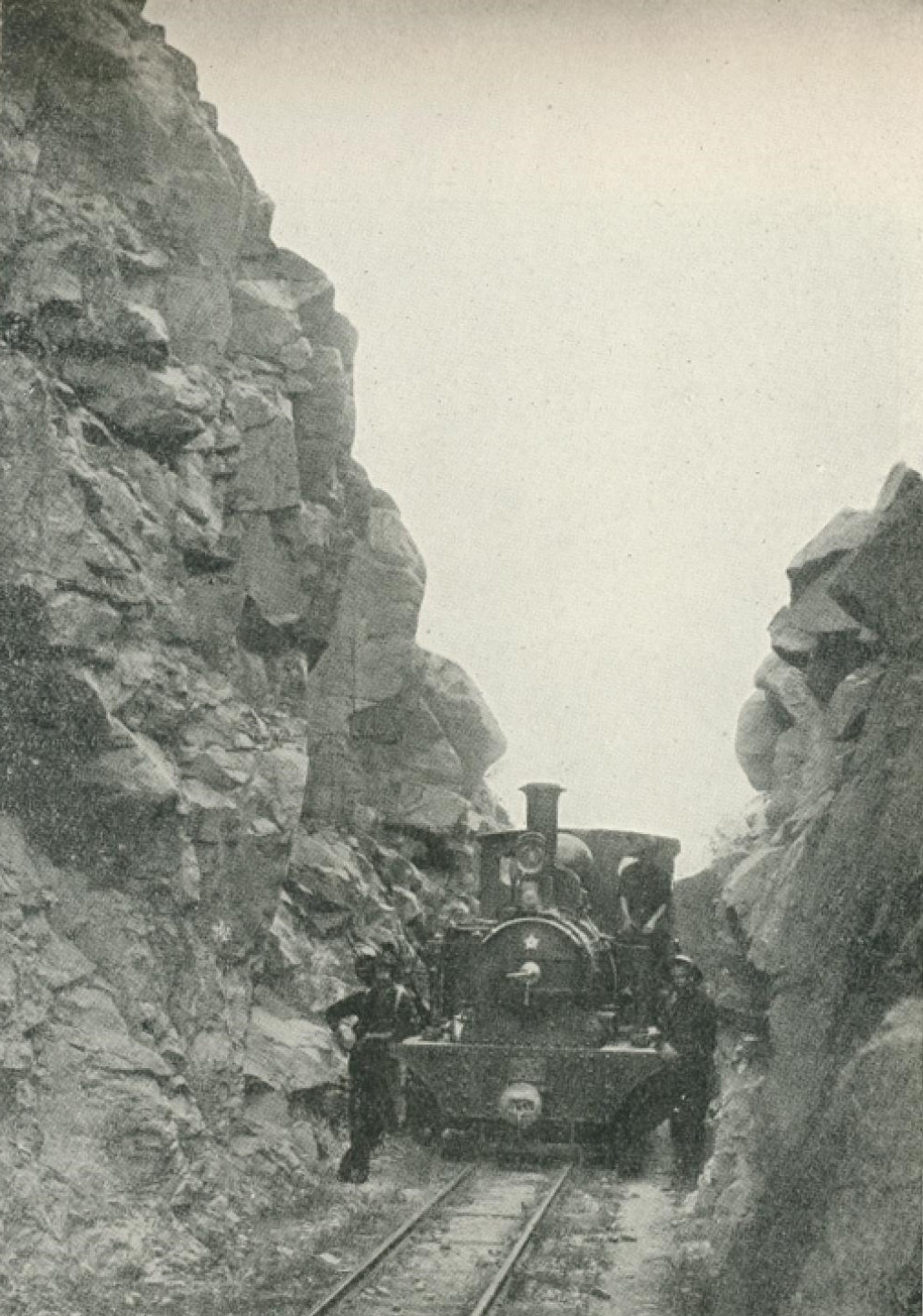
Cutting on the Stannary Hills Tramway

Construction work on The Junction to Irvinebank section started in August 1906. About 150 men were employed on the construction work, with one gang working on cuttings and general formations, one gang on platelaying and one gang on bridge construction. Construction workers were paid 8 shillings per day, while gangers were paid 10 shillings per day.

By 1907 Herberton and Irvinebank were the centre of Queensland's base metal industry with major smelters and batteries producing nearly three-quarters of Queensland's tin production. The construction of a tramway from Irvinebank to Stannary Hills had the potential to link Moffat's tin mining empire by rail to the newly discovered coal supplies at Mount Mulligan, the port of Cairns, Brisbane, and on to Sydney, Melbourne and eventually Adelaide.

Early in 1907 the rails had extended almost all the way into Irvinebank. A siding and goods shed known as Close-up was established just below the overflow of the Ibis Dam at Loudoun Mill. This remained the goods shed until the tramway station at the Loudoun Mill was completed. The first load of firewood was delivered to Loudoun Mill by tramway on 28 March 1907. John Moffat's company began transporting goods on behalf of the public from June 1907.

The official opening of the tramway was a festive occasion. It took the form of a grand picnic, hosted by John and Margaret Moffat at the "All-but" near Fireclay Gully on the west of town on 29 June 1907. Several trams conveyed the 1500 guests to the specially cleared site. Businesses closed for the day and all of Irvinebank was there. Entertainment included sports, dancing, barrel mule and steam merry-go-round.

After its construction, the Stannary Hills to Irvinebank tramway served for two decades as the most reliable form of transport to and from Stannary Hills, Rocky Bluff and Irvinebank. A long procession of politicians, journalists, promoters, company directors and Governor William MacGregor himself came this way to visit John Moffat and the Loudoun Mill. The passenger carriage was attached to the goods wagon loaded with coke and town and mill supplies and hauled by wood burning locomotives. The twenty-one mile trip took four hours and all travel was at the passengers own risk.

In the first year 61,782 tonnes of freight and 8,696 passengers were transported between Irvinebank and Boonmoo. Passenger fares were 4 shillings return from Irvinebank to Stannary Hills, compared to 2 shillings for the same distance, from Boonmoo to Stannary Hills on the Rocky Bluff line. A 2 shillings and sixpence surcharge was charged for public freight on the Irvinebank line and the first class freight rate was 40% higher than the Government and Stannary Hills Tramway rates.

While the Stannary Hills to Irvinebank tramway was principally used for transporting ore, metal, fuel and general supplies, it also offered an enormous social benefit to those employed in the tin industry west of the Atherton Tablelands. A number of social outings relied on the transport of the tramway, such as employees picnics and other special events. The tramways also carried goods such as kerosene, ice, fruit and vegetables, beer and mail.

John Moffat retired from managing the Irvinebank mining industry in February 1912 aged 72. One time General Manager of Stannary Hills Mine and Tramway Company, JH Reid, took over as manager of Irvinebank Mining Company Ltd and continued operations on a restricted scale. The First World War further accentuated the decline in the Irvinebank tin fields. The whole of the mining, milling and smelter works were sold to the Queensland Government in 1919 for the total sum of £22,500.

Loudoun Mill was reopened as the Irvinebank State Treatment Works in October 1919. Operations were continued until December 1920. The tramway service from Boonmoo to Irvinebank came under the control of the State Treatment Works. In 1922 the Queensland Government purchased the Stannary Hills to Rocky Bluff line from John Darling and Company, who had previously purchased the tramway from Stannary Hills Mine and Tramway Company. Locomotives and stock were then moved to Irvinebank and pooled with the Irvinebank tramway engines and stock. The Junction to Stannary Hills line was dismantled in 1926.

After several unsuccessful attempts had been made to revive the mining industry in the district, tramway operations ceased permanently at the end of 1936. In 1938 the locomotive "Old John" was sold to the Marian Sugar Mills. During the Second World War the government disposed of all recoverable materials from the mines. The rails were taken up and sold to cane and mining tramways in the state. Some ironwork was purchased by Douglas Shire Council for the Port Douglas tramway, which was eventually incorporated into, and is still used by, the Mossman Mill.

== Route ==
See map in Chillagoe Railway & Mining Co.

- Main line
  - Boonmoo
  - Stannary Hills
  - Irvinebank Junction
- North branch
  - Rocky Bluff
- South branch
  - Irvinebank

== Description ==
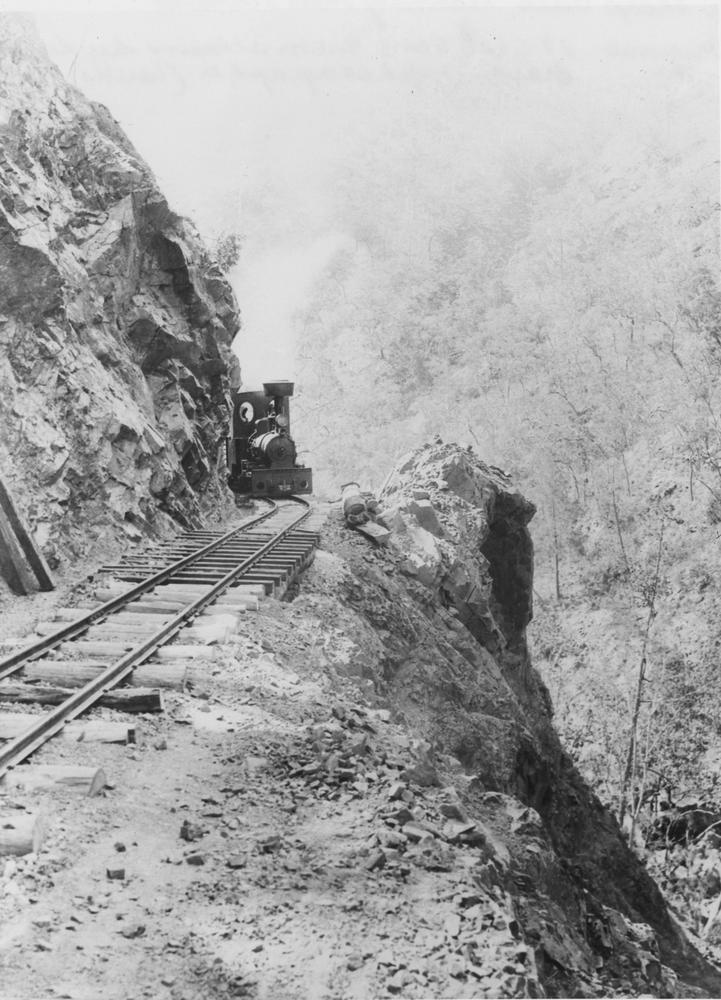
Tramway, 1902

The formations are evidence of two tramways that operated between Irvinebank and Boonmoo for approximately 29 kilometres (18 mi) in the tin mining fields west of the Atherton Tablelands. One formation is evident from Boonmoo to Rocky Bluff via Stannary Hills and the second tramway from The Junction to Irvinebank. The tramways ran on a two-foot gauge, distinct from the state railway system which operated on a 3 feet 6 inches (1.07 m) gauge.

The tramway alignment is traceable from Boonmoo siding but the evidence at this end is now minimal. The heritage register boundary starts at 17.25991°S 145.10478°E where the formation now forms part of a station access road. The formation heads south-east along Eureka Creek. The formation is partly excavated into the sides of Eureka Creek valley. The formation is raised over some areas of solid rock by means of stone retaining walls containing earth fill. Ruins of bridges, minor earthworks and cuttings can be seen between Boonmoo and the 6 Mile (6 miles from Boonmoo). A large quantity of broken bricks mark the site of the former brick factory beside the tramway formation at 10 Mile (17.30605°S 145.17661°E).

A number of ore bins can be seen on or near the formation, with markings "Arthur Berlin" at 17.30863°S 145.17891°E. Near the ore bin site, the tramway formation turns sharply into the west bank of Bock's Creek, a tributary of Eureka Creek, travels upstream along this creek and then comes back into Eureka Creek on the east side of Bock's Creek. Eureka Creek Gorge is between Bock's Creek and Stannary Hills.

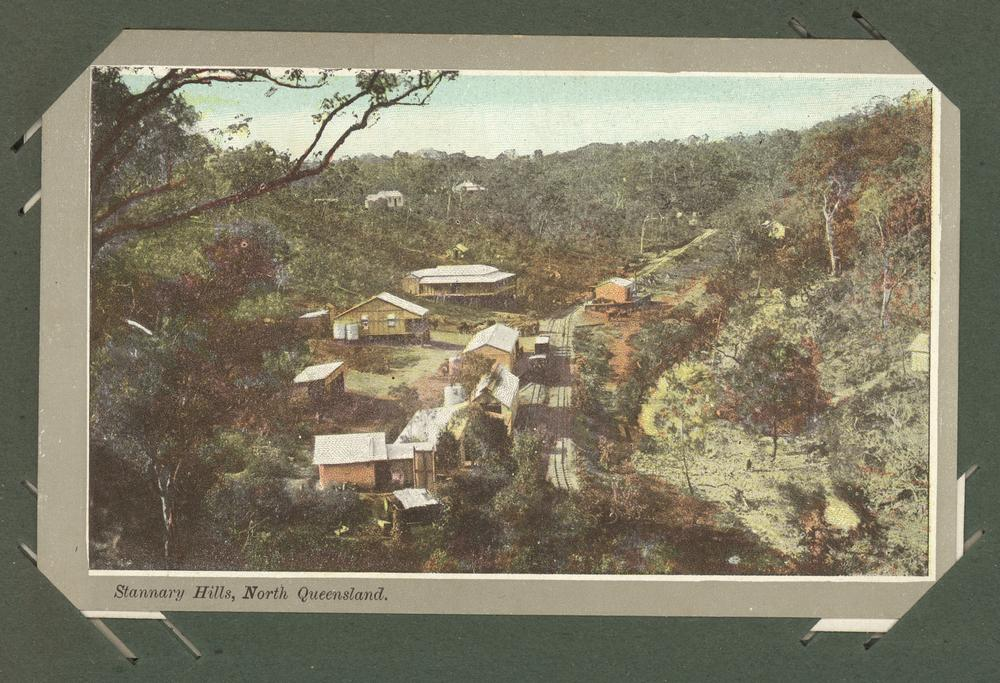
Stannary Hills and the tramway, circa 1907

Two old mango trees, about 25 metres (82 ft) away from the formation, mark the tramway station site at Stannary Hills (17.31285°S 145.21458°E and 17.31285°S 145.21458°E). Some glass and metal fragments are evident here, and there are some remains of the Stannary Hills station building, most notably remnants of the loco service pit.

A concrete weir is constructed in Eureka Creek at Stannary Hills; this is included in the heritage entry. Remains of a corrugated iron water tank can be seen on the formation above the weir (17.31367°S 145.21448°E). The formation is clearly visible at Stannary Hills excepting a 10-metre (33 ft) section where the formation rounds a bend between the mango trees and the weir and appears to have been disturbed by recent mining activities.

From Stannary Hills to the Black Bridge site (17.31528°S 145.22139°E) the formation is benched into the side of a steep slope into Eureka Creek. Concrete blocks and the base of timber stumps are all that remains of this bridge, the largest on the Stannary Hills to Irvinebank section. The Bradman inscription ("Bradman 320") is inscribed on one of the concrete blocks here, although it was not located at the time the formation was inspected.

The tramway diverges at the Junction on the bank of Eureka Creek adjacent to a station track (17.31304°S 145.23055°E). Cuttings can be seen on both sides of the creek and both sides of the station track. There is no evidence of the bridge that once took the tramway across Eureka Creek from the Junction towards Rocky Bluff. The formation of the Rocky Bluff line is evident from the Junction to a point at 17.31304S 145.23055E. From here the formation has been disturbed by recent mining activities. The Rocky Bluff line crosses Loloma Dam (the section crossing Loloma Dam does not form part of the heritage listing) and into Lot 612 OL72 where the formation and terminus at Rocky Bluff becomes part of the Rocky Bluff heritage listing.

The Irvinebank line turns south from the Junction and can be clearly traced to a point at 17.31159°S 145.23102°E where it has been disturbed by mining activities The formation again becomes visible at 17.31564°S 145.23133°E to 17.3246°S 145.23143°E. Further mining disturbance has heavily impacted the formation from here to 17.33427°S 145.22602°E. The formation is clear from this point to Yorkies Cutting, at the boundary between Boonmoo and Montalbion Stations.

Yorkies Cutting is located at 17.34205°S 145.23102°E. It is a distinctive landmark about 5 metres (16 ft) deep and 20 metres (66 ft) long consisting of a cutting into rocky ground. From here the formation is visible for another few hundred metres, in some places the metal railway spikes show where the formation once lay on flat sandy ground. The formation is not evident for approximately 200 metres (660 ft) through a sandy area of melaleuca sp. but can be seen again as it approaches Hales Siding.

Hales Siding consists of a small curved section of tramway formation north of the Herberton-Petford Road. This section is apparently part of some sort of spur line that went from the main line into Hales Siding. The area to the north of the road consists of a flattened, disturbed area marked by distinct signs of several layers of settlement over a large area. These include a concrete floor with machine foundations and two posts (possibly from a roof or shed over machinery), at least three mature common mango trees, two smaller Bowen mango trees, one small citrus tree, a number of small pine trees, a jacaranda and a frangipani. A vertical excavation into rock could mark an engine watering pit, a well or a mineshaft. While there are areas of disturbance, there is evidence of the tramway spur line.

The tramway formation meets the northern side of the Herberton-Petford Road at 17°21.8′S 145°12.812′E. The line reappears on the opposite side of the road at17°21.803′S 145°12.803′E. At this latter point there are small scatters of coal, slag and glass bottle fragments and the tramway is visible though indistinct. There is evidence of the spur line to a point of major disturbance at 17°21.675′S 145°12.612′E about 25 metres (82 ft) from the Stannary Hills Road junction. Some of these sections are indistinct and there are signs of possible disturbance but no old tracks. Other sections are very clear and include raised areas, shallow cuttings, a stone formation and a fallen telegraph pole with wire and insulator fragments.

From the Stannary Hills Road junction, the tramway formation follows the Herberton-Petford Road in a south-westerly direction. About 300 metres (980 ft) from the junction it meets a track heading approximately south-east, which creates an area of disturbance 8 metres (26 ft) wide. On either side of the track the tramway formations are broken from 17°21.786′S 145°12.474′Eto 17°21.784′S 145°12.473′E. On the tramway formation to the south-west of the disturbance there are the remains of a bridge over a creek at 17°21.828′S 145°12.453′E and a small creek crossing with reinforcing rods near a cutting.

From the track, the tramway formation follows the Herberton-Petford Road until it meets another track about 600 metres (2,000 ft) from the Stannary Hills Road junction. This also heads approximately south-east. It creates an area of disturbance approximately 13 metres (43 ft) wide. On either side of the track tramway formations are broken from 17°21.920′S 145°12.281′E to 17°21.919′S 145°12.285′E.

From here, the tramway formation runs fairly close to the Herberton-Petford Road and is frequently visible, particularly for about a kilometer in the vicinity of Weinart Siding. There is stone pitching near to the road at 17°22.358′S 145°11.418′E. The base of a telegraph pole, broken insulators and a metal bracket for holding insulators were found nearby, between the tramway formation and the road. Small metal scatters, including rail spikes, were also found on or next to the tramway formation in this area.

The area south of Weinart Siding has suffered considerable disturbance. A fence and a firebreak intersect the tramway formation and a new track or firebreak runs along the fence. The disturbed area runs from the northerly side of the track/fire break along a fence (17°22.496′S 145°11.324′E) to 17°22.539′S 145°11.260′E on the south side. The disturbance extends to the Herberton-Petford Road.

From the disturbance south of Weinart Siding to Victoria Siding, the tramway heads more or less south and is no longer close to the Herberton-Petford Road. North of Chinaman Creek, mining and grazing activities have caused considerable disturbance between southern point 17°23.653′S 145°11.068′E and northern point 17°23.504′S 145°11.151′E. There is a section of tramway formation visible between these points but part of it serves as a bank on the Mont Albion Station dam.

The tramway formation from Chinaman Creek to Victoria Siding (on the Irvinebank-Petford Road) is clear and in good condition and there are many scatters and tramway remains. Among these is a creek crossing with a wooden pole and fine stone work at 17°24.042′S 145°11.108′E. There is also a standing telegraph pole at 17°23.912′S 145°11.104′E; another is nearby. Close to the first pole is a partly exposed 2–3" pipeline. There is another railway sleeper with two spikes at 17°23.885′S 145°11.123′E and one with four spikes at 17°23.859′S 145°11.136′E. At this point there is a crossing with stone work.

The tramway formations meet the Hereberton-Petford Road again at Victoria Siding. The heritage boundary ends at a deep rock cutting at Games Flat which is marked by a mature mango and other exotic trees.

== Heritage listing ==
Stannary Hills Tramways were listed on the Queensland Heritage Register on 25 February 2005 having satisfied the following criteria.

The place is important in demonstrating the evolution or pattern of Queensland's history.

The Irvinebank and Stannary Hills tramway formations, constructed between 1901 and 1907 are significant in Queensland's history for the role they played in the development of the north Queensland tin fields.

The place demonstrates rare, uncommon or endangered aspects of Queensland's cultural heritage.

The formation demonstrates an uncommon aspect of Queensland's cultural heritage as a track with a gauge of 2 feet (0.61 m), constructed specifically for the mining industry for private freight and passengers, and being of private construction.

The place has potential to yield information that will contribute to an understanding of Queensland's history.

Archaeological remains such as discarded mining equipment, bottle dumps, locally made bricks and bridge span constructions associated with the tramway formation have the potential to yield information that will contribute to an understanding of Queensland's history.

The place has a strong or special association with a particular community or cultural group for social, cultural or spiritual reasons.

The tramway formations have a special and continued association with the tin mining community of north Queensland and a special association with the life or work of John Moffat.

The place has a special association with the life or work of a particular person, group or organisation of importance in Queensland's history.

The tramway formations have a special and continued association with the tin mining community of north Queensland and a special association with the life or work of John Moffat. Moffat was important in Queensland's history as a regional entrepreneur who controlled mineral developments in North Queensland from 1880 to 1912. Moffat built the Irvinebank to Stannary Hills tramway between 1906 and 1907, and owned and operated the Irvinebank to Stannary Hills tramway privately from 1906 to 1912.

== See also ==
- List of tramways in Queensland
