= Loudoun House, Irvinebank =

Loudoun House
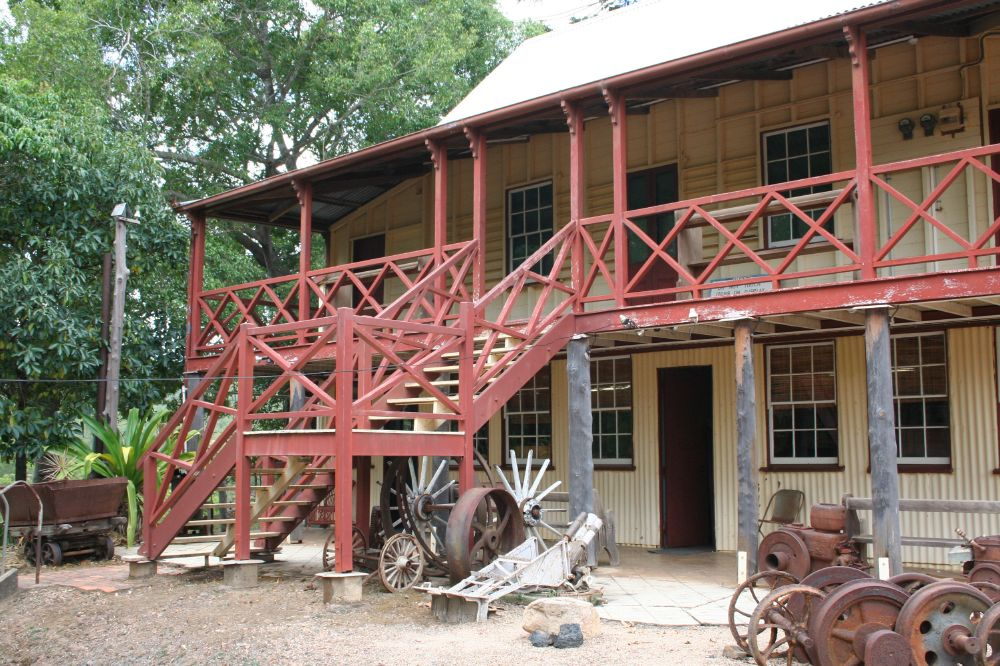
- Loudoun House, 2006

- Location within Queensland Location within Australia
- 17.4289°S 145.2045°E
- Location: 16 O'Callaghan Street, Irvinebank, Shire of Mareeba, Queensland, Australia

History
- Design period: 1870s–1890s (late 19th century)
- Built: c. 1883–1884

Queensland Heritage Register
- Official name: Loudoun House, Moffat's House
- Type: state heritage (built, landscape)
- Designated: 21 October 1992
- Reference no.: 600680
- Significant period: 1880s–1900s (fabric, historical)
- Significant components: furniture/fittings, basement / sub-floor, residential accommodation – main house, office/s, tank – water, kitchen/kitchen house, trees/plantings

Loudoun House is a heritage-listed detached house at 16 O'Callaghan Street, Irvinebank, in the Shire of Mareeba in Queensland, Australia. It was built c. 1883–1884. It is also known as Moffat's House. It was added to the Queensland Heritage Register on 21 October 1992. It is now operated as the Loudoun House Museum by the Irvinebank School of Arts & Progress Association.

== History ==
John Moffat (1841–1918) was a mining entrepreneur of considerable standing. His influence dominated the mining industry of the Cairns hinterland from the early 1880s until World War I; he was instrumental in founding the towns of Irvinebank, Watsonville, Chillagoe, Mungana, Mount Garnet, and Mount Molloy.

Moffat, the greatest mining magnate of his time in Queensland, is still remembered with affection in the North. He is credited with a scrupulous regard for ethical business practices, and the imposition of a benevolent paternalism over mining enterprises under his control. He was a man of high moral principles. The extent that Irvinebank residents relied on the industries created by John Moffat for their livelihoods is evident in the prayer "God Bless John Moffat" said to be taught by Irvinebank parents to their children at the turn of the century.

At a time when gold was the glamour industry of the region, Moffat concentrated his investments in base metals, notably tin and copper. He built a battery and smelter (the Loudoun Mill) at Irvinebank, centre of a rich tin lode district, and from 1883 lived in the town, first in tents and later in Loudoun House. His choice of a house site was characteristic of the man - whereas most wealthy mine owners disdained to live in the district where their mines were located, Moffat built right in the centre of Irvinebank, overlooking the Assay office, two minutes walk from the smelters and within earshot of the stampers. His house was also a very short distance from the Queensland National Bank, and connected to it by a benched pathway; demonstrating the complex and powerful influence the bank had on the mining industry, or vice versa. The Irvinebank-to-Stannary Hills tramway ran between the Queensland National Bank and Loudoun House, and into the Tramway Station at Loudoun Mill.

Moffat's house was built c. 1883/4. An 1886 photograph (Kerr 200X:9) shows a two story timber house surrounded by verandahs on four sides (partly enclosed) with a small detached timber building to the rear. It is believed to be an early use of high timber stumps and infilling of the sub-floor to create a second floor at ground level. Drawings indicate an expansion program occurred around 1907 expanding the servant's wing on the eastern side of the building. Conventionally framed timber exposed studwork was used. An unusual construction method of single skin brickwork reinforced with timber framing was used in a surviving section of the earlier kitchen wing. This was presumably used for food storage. The original section of the servant's wing, or the eastern side, has a concrete floor. The additional rooms have timber floor, walls and ceiling. A concrete water tank is at the south-eastern corner of the servant's wing.

In correspondence Moffat described the house as built of local cedar cleared from Loudoun Dam and imported seasoned timber. It comprised a sitting room, two main bedrooms, four side verandah bedrooms, plus a front verandah affording a fine view over the Mill site and dam. The downstairs area was enclosed for cool offices, store, and assay rooms. Bachelor quarters were added twenty years later.

Moffat's mining empire fell on hard times with the fall in metal prices in 1907. In 1912 he was forced by the Queensland National Bank to retire (to his Cremorne home in Sydney) as the tin industry subsided. Shortly after his death from influenza at Toowoomba in 1918, the Irvinebank works were purchased in 1919 by the Queensland Government as a State treatment works. The State Government continued to use the downstairs section as an office for the State Treatment Works with upper floor becoming accommodation for employees of the Works. It served for a time as the manager's residence. By 1980 it was still occupied as an office and storeroom by the Department of Mines. By 1984 it was in use as a museum building by the Irvinebank Progress Association. In 1987 R200 (lot 6 on plan HG710) was gazetted as reserve for museum purposes.

== Description ==
Loudoun House is a high-set timber building with enclosed sub-floor and additional kitchen and bedroom areas on the eastern side. It has a westerly aspect from the top of a low spur in Irvinebank, near the ruins of the Assay Office and above the Queensland National Bank Building and the School of Arts. A number of trees surround the building, including mangoes, red cedar, boab, figs and a bunya pine. The Irvinebank to Stannary Hills tramway formation, is evident on the lower side of the property where it has been used as pedestrian access to MacDonald Street below.

The original house was a simple gabled roof timber structure with encircling verandahs. Offices were located in the sub-floor and the living spaces were above. Subsequent extensions were made on both floors during Moffat's residence.

The upper level is supported on cypress pine or ironbark stumps. The sub-floor is enclosed with walls of unlined corrugated iron. The floor is tongue and groove red cedar on lower and upper levels inside the building and concrete below the verandah overhangs outside.

The upper level has tongue and groove red cedar walls, ceiling and floor; the verandah is not tongue and groove. Studs are exposed on the exterior verandah and back walls. Studs are internal on the north and south sides of the building. The upper section of the house has a central living area, with four rooms at the rear of the building and two rooms on either side of the main living area. An additional room comes off the rear of the building and a stove alcove is on the northern side room.

Some of the original furnishings are still present in the house including Moffat's office desk and table, but most of the furnishings were removed by the Department of Mines in 1967/68.

Little remains of the once extensive landscaping apart from the established fig (Ficus sp.), red cedar (Toona ciliata), mangoes (Mangifera sp.), boab (Adansonia gregorii) and bunya pine (Araucaria bidwillii).

== Heritage listing ==
Loudoun House was listed on the Queensland Heritage Register on 21 October 1992 having satisfied the following criteria.

- The place is important in demonstrating the evolution or pattern of Queensland's history.

Loudoun House at Irvinebank was erected c. 1883–84 for mining entrepreneur John Moffat who dominated the mining industry of the Cairns hinterland for thirty years (1880s–1910s). The house is closely associated with the development of the mining industry (in particular tin and copper) in North Queensland. The use of high blocks to create a second floor at ground level is regarded as an early use.

- The place has a special association with the life or work of a particular person, group or organisation of importance in Queensland's history.

Its siting in close proximity to both the Loudoun Mill and town of Irvinebank (including the offices of the Queensland National Bank) are regarded as symbolic of Moffat's "hands on" approach to his business activities including his relationship with employees and their families and in the case of the Queensland National Bank of its major role in Moffat's business affairs.
