= Glen Russell, Queensland =

Glen Russell
- Suburb
- Interactive map of Glen Russell
- Coordinates: 16.9041°S 145.1766°E
- Country: Australia
- State: Queensland
- LGA: Shire of Mareeba
- Location: 32.7 km (20.3 mi) WNW of Mareeba; 51 km (32 mi) NE of Dimbulah; 95 km (59 mi) W of Cairns; 409 km (254 mi) NW of Townsville; 1,765 km (1,097 mi) NNW of Brisbane

Government
  - State electorate: Cook
  - Federal division: Kennedy

Area
  - Total: 279.6 km^{2} (108.0 sq mi)

Population
  - Total: 0 (2021 census)
  - Density: 0.0000/km^{2} (0.000/sq mi)
- Time zone: UTC+10:00 (AEST)
- Postcode: 4880
Suburbs around Glen Russell
Mount Mulligan	Mount Mulligan	Paddys Green
Thornborough	Glen Russell	Paddys Green
Thornborough	Arriga	Paddys Green

Glen Russell is a rural locality in the Shire of Mareeba, Queensland, Australia. In the 2021 census, Glen Russell had "no people or a very low population".

== Geography ==
The Hodgkinson River rises in the south-west of the locality and that part of the locality formed part of the Hodgkinson Minerals Area, which experienced a goldrush in the 1870s and then sporadic mining over subsequent decades though to the 1930s.

The land use is predominantly grazing on native vegetation with a small amount of crop growing in the centre and south of the locality.

== Demographics ==
In the 2016 census, Glen Russell had a population of 12 people.

In the 2021 census, Glen Russell had "no people or a very low population".

== Education ==
There are no schools in Glen Russell. The nearest government primary schools are Mareeba State School in Mareeba to the south-east and Dimbulah State School in Dimbulah to the south. However, these schools would be too distant for students living in the northern parts of the locality; the alternatives are distance education and boarding school. The nearest government secondary schools are Mareeba State High School (to Year 12) in Mareeba and Dimbulah State School (to Year 10).

There are also Catholic and other private schools in Mareeba and a Catholic primary school in Dimbulah.
