= Mutchilba, Queensland =

Mutchilba
- Town
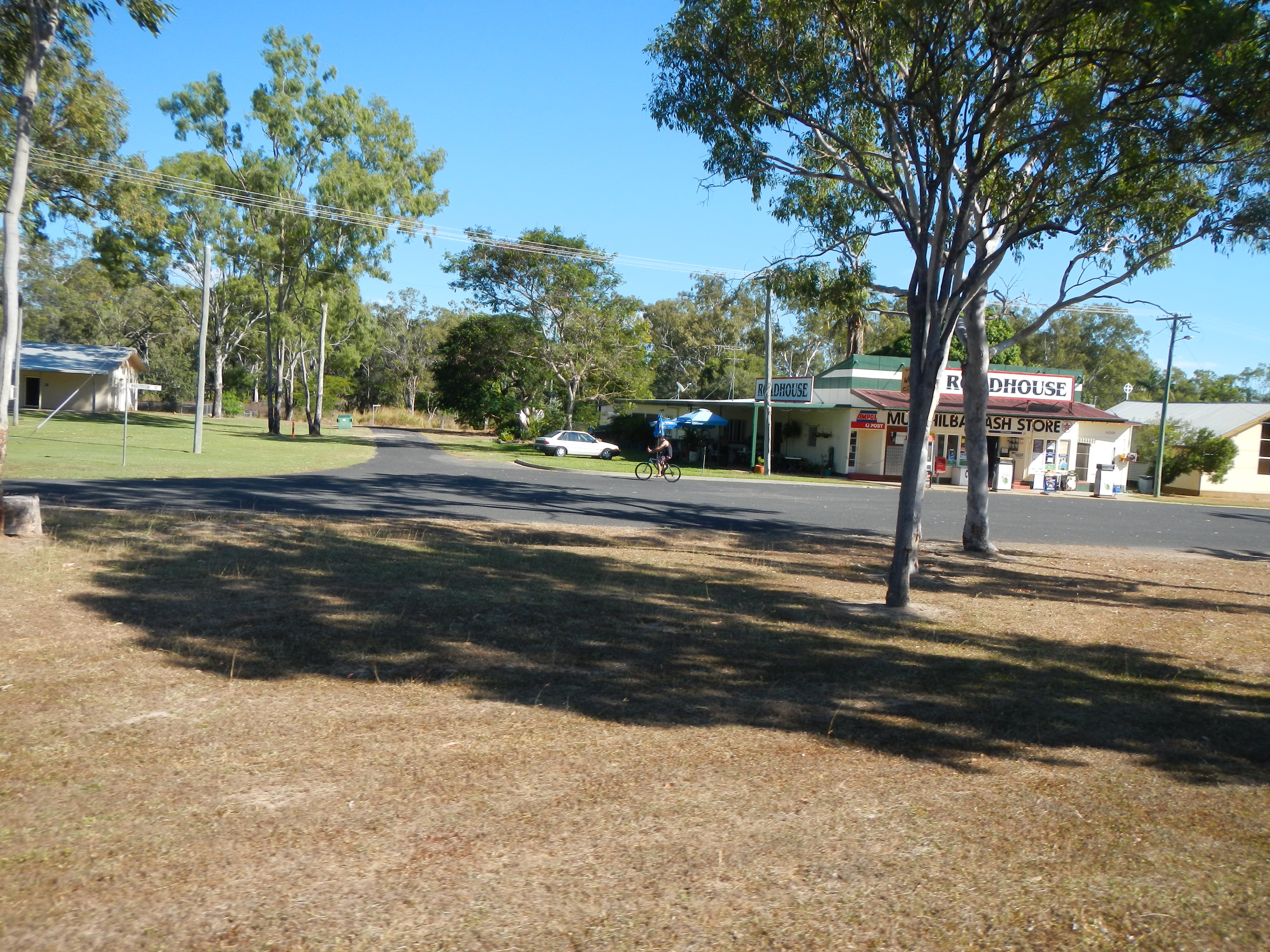
- Mutchilba roadhouse, 2013

- Interactive map of Mutchilba
- Coordinates: 17.1386°S 145.2091°E
- Country: Australia
- State: Queensland
- LGA: Shire of Mareeba
- Location: 11.3 km (7.0 mi) E of Dimbulah; 35.2 km (21.9 mi) SW of Mareeba; 97.4 km (60.5 mi) WSW of Cairns; 1,753 km (1,089 mi) NNW of Brisbane
- Established: 1955

Government
  - State electorates: Hill; Cook
  - Federal division: Kennedy

Area
  - Total: 407.1 km^{2} (157.2 sq mi)
- Elevation: 480 m (1,570 ft)

Population
  - Total: 627 (2021 census)
  - Density: 1.5402/km^{2} (3.989/sq mi)
- Time zone: UTC+10:00 (AEST)
- Postcode: 4872
Localities around Mutchilba
Thornborough	Arriga	Arriga
Dimbulah	Mutchilba	Tolga
Dimbulah	Irvinebank	Watsonville

Mutchilba is a rural town and locality in the Shire of Mareeba, in Far North Queensland, Australia. It is known for its production of mangoes.

In the 2021 census, the locality of Mutchilba had a population of 627 people.

== Geography ==
Mutchilba is on the Atherton Tableland, 98 kilometres (61 mi) south-west of Cairns via the Captain Cook Highway, Kennedy Highway and State Route 27. From further west it can be accessed via the Burke Developmental Road.

The town is located in the north-west of the locality on the Mareeba-Dimbulah Road 34 kilometres (21 mi) west of Mareeba.

The Great Dividing Range forms part of the eastern boundary of the locality, and the locality has the following mountains (from west to east):

- Mount Masterton (17.1631°S 145.2766°E) 849 metres (2,785 ft)
- Wog Hill (17.1946°S 145.3180°E) 769 metres (2,523 ft)
- Hoot Hill (17.1951°S 145.3632°E) 847 metres (2,779 ft)
- Mount Emerald (17.2035°S 145.4058°E) 1,124 metres (3,688 ft)

The Tablelands railway line enters the locality from the north-east (Arriga), passes through the town, and exits to the west (Dimbulah). Historically, the locality was served by many railway station, but all are now abandoned (from west to east):

- Piemonte railway station (17.1324°S 145.1654°E)
- Fumar railway station (17.1335°S 145.1796°E)
- Mutchilba railway station (17.1376°S 145.2079°E)
- Algoma railway station (17.1389°S 145.2303°E)
- Parada railway station (17.1396°S 145.2481°E)
- Lemonside railway station (17.1367°S 145.2539°E)
- Bontaba railway station (17.1207°S 145.2734°E)
- Tabacum railway station (17.1117°S 145.2964°E)

== History ==
Mutchilba railway station was named on 2 March 1923 by the Queensland Railways Department using an Aboriginal word meaning big dead tree.

Mutchilba State School opened on 21 August 1939.

A design plan for the town of Mutchilba was prepared in August 1954 as part of the development of the Mareeba-Dimbula irritation area. The first town allotments were surveyed in March 1955.

Mutchilba Post Office opened on 1 March 1956 (a telegraph office had been open from 1936).

The town was downgraded by the Mareeba Shire Council in 1999 and has been officially a part of Dimbulah, Queensland since then. On 12 October 2012 it was announced that the town is again officially recognised in the Queensland place names database.

Between 2008 and 2013, Mutchilba (along with the rest of the Shire of Mareeba) was within the Tablelands Region.

== Demographics ==
In the 2016 census, the locality of Mutchilba had a population of 495 people.

In the 2021 census, the locality of Mutchilba had a population of 627 people.

== Economy ==
Mutchilba is known for its large production of mangoes.

Despite the name, the Mount Emerald Wind Farm is not in Mutchilba, but is on the north-western slopes of Mount Emerald in the neighbouring locality of Arriga.

== Education ==
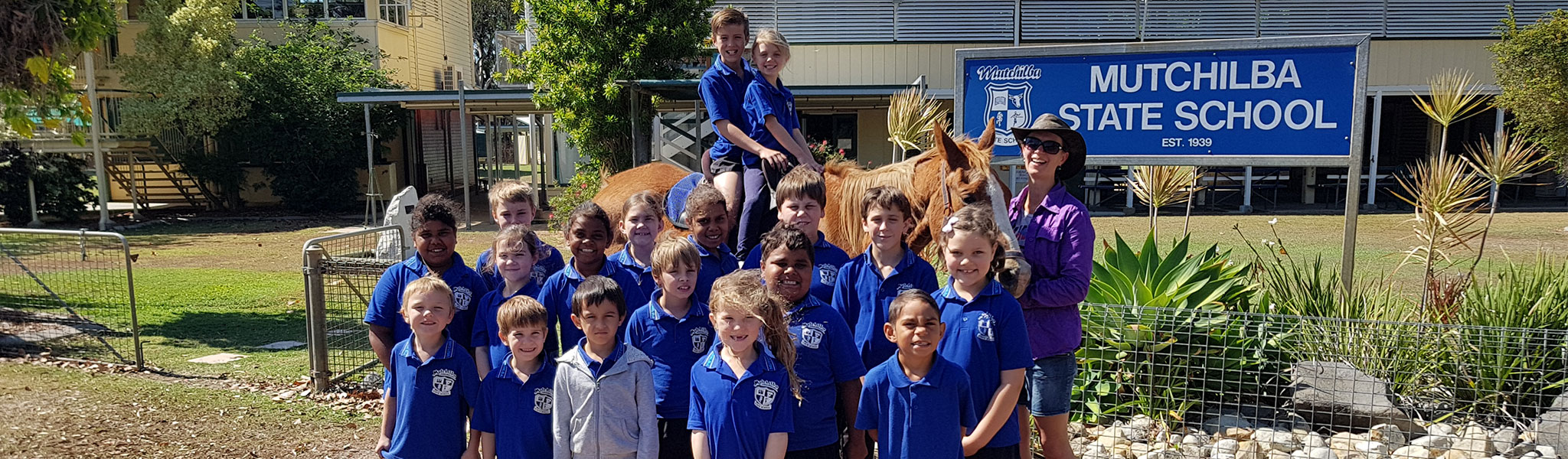
Mutchilba State School, 2022

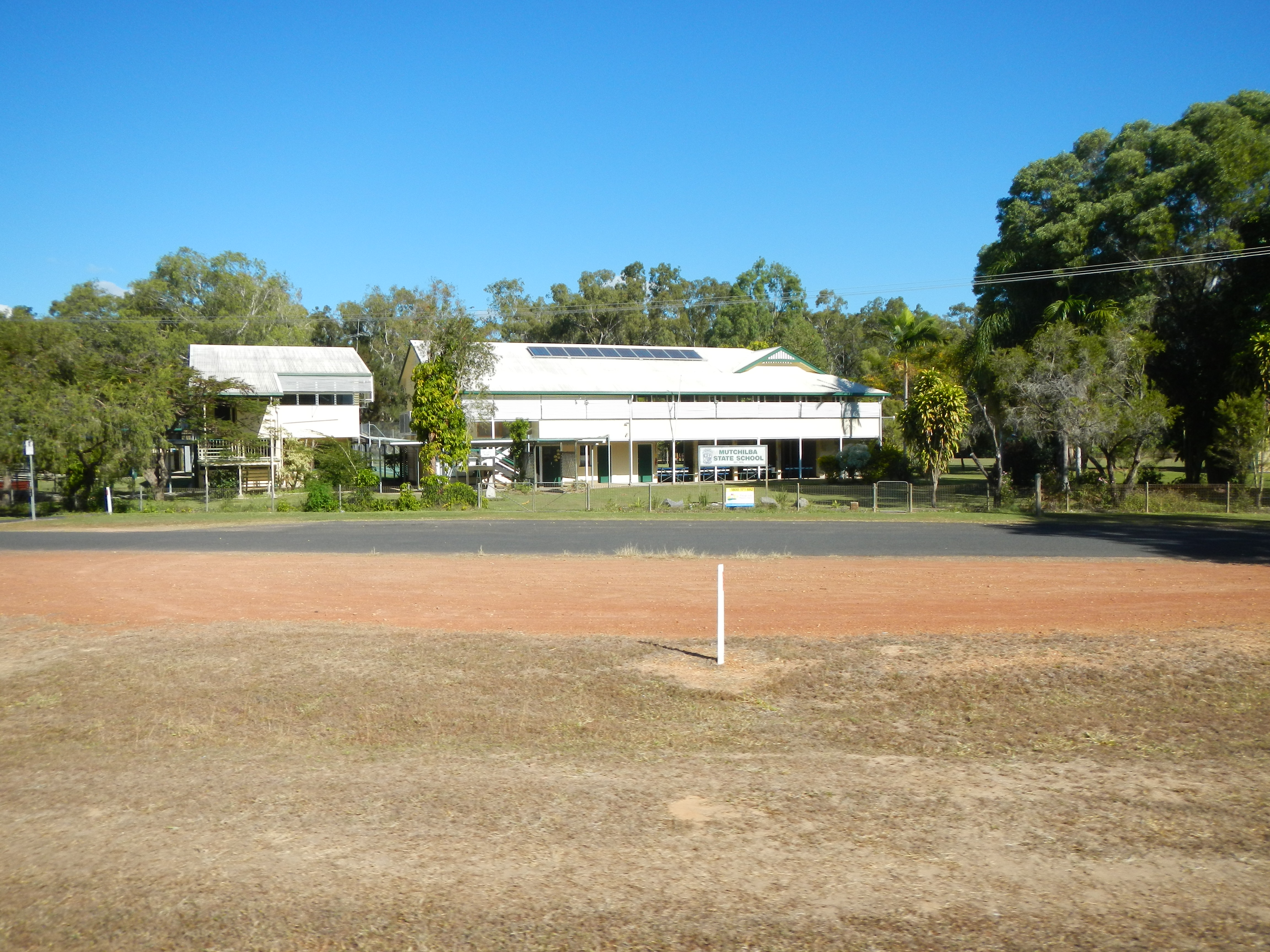
Mutchilba State School, 2013

Mutchilba State School is a government primary (Prep-6) school for boys and girls at 33 Marsterson Street (17.1393°S 145.2120°E). In 2017, the school had an enrolment of 24 students with 2 teachers and 4 non-teaching staff (2 full-time equivalent). In 2018, the school had an enrolment of 20 students with 4 teachers (2 full-time equivalent) and 5 non-teaching staff (3 full-time equivalent).

There are no secondary schools in Mutchilba. The nearest government secondary schools are Dimbulah State School (to Year 10) in neighbouring Dimbulah to the west and Mareeba State High School (to Year 12) in Mareeba to the north-east.

== Amenities ==
St Joseph's Catholic Church is in Masterson Street. It is within the Dimbulah Parish of the Roman Catholic Diocese of Cairns which is administered from the Atherton parish.

== Events ==
Mutchilba is known for the "Mango Mardi Gras", which is a celebration of the many mango farms in the region.

The Feast of St Joseph is celebrated by the Catholic church on the first Friday of March with a mass followed by a barbeque.
