= Walkamin, Queensland =

Walkamin
- Town
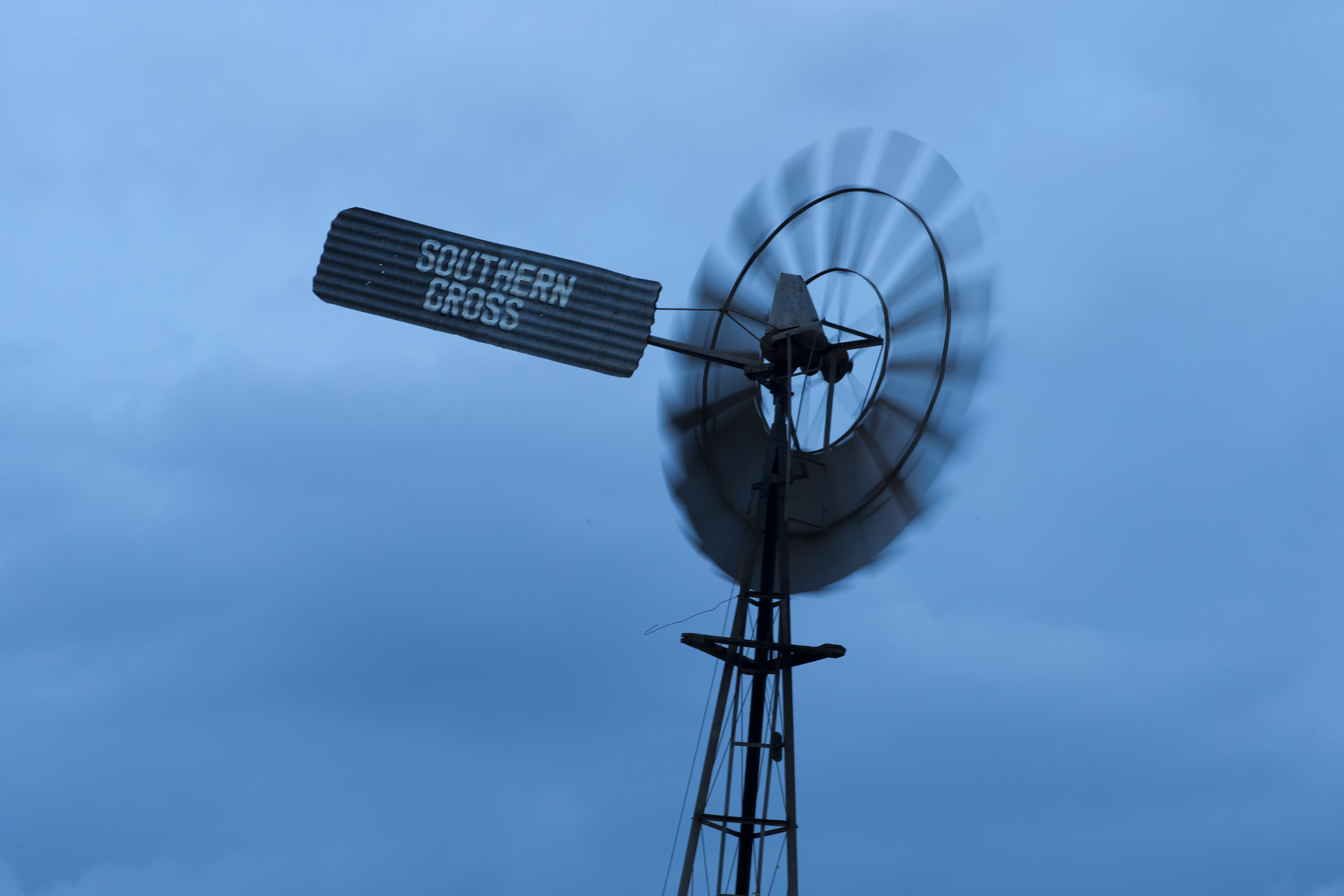
- A storm approaching Walkamin during the wet season, 2014

- Interactive map of Walkamin
- Coordinates: 17.1291°S 145.4269°E
- Country: Australia
- State: Queensland
- LGA: Tablelands Region
- Location: 15 km (9.3 mi) S of Mareeba; 76 km (47 mi) W of Cairns; 1,702 km (1,058 mi) NW of Brisbane

Government
  - State electorate: Hill =
  - Federal division: Kennedy

Area
  - Total: 47.1 km^{2} (18.2 sq mi)

Population
  - Total: 532 (2021 census)
  - Density: 11.295/km^{2} (29.25/sq mi)
- Postcode: 4872
- Mean max temp: 27.4 °C (81.3 °F)
- Mean min temp: 17.1 °C (62.8 °F)
- Annual rainfall: 1,043.9 mm (41.10 in)
Localities around Walkamin
Chewko	Mareeba	Mareeba
Arriga	Walkamin	Mareeba
Arriga	Arriga	Tolga

Walkamin is a rural town and locality in the Tablelands Region, Queensland, Australia. In the 2021 census, the locality of Walkamin had a population of 532 people.

== Geography ==
Walkamin is on the Atherton Tableland in Far North Queensland between Mareeba and Tolga. The Kennedy Highway traverses the locality from the south-east to the north-east passing through the town.

=== Climate ===
Walkamin has a tropical savannah climate, bordering on a dry-winter humid subtropical climate (Köppen: Aw/Cwa). The town has a hot and humid wet season from mid-November to mid-April and a warm, sunny dry season from mid-April to mid-November; though the climate is made cooler and drier by the town's elevation. Average maxima vary from 30.7 °C (87.3 °F) in December to 23.4 °C (74.1 °F) in July, while average minima fluctuate between 20.5 °C (68.9 °F) in February and 13.1 °C (55.6 °F) in July. Mean average annual precipitation is moderate, 1,043.9 mm (41.10 in) spread between 83.8 precipitation days (above the 1.0 mm (0.039 in) threshold). Extreme temperatures have ranged from 39.8 °C (103.6 °F) on 6 January 1994 and 19 November 1990 to 2.6 °C (36.7 °F) on 4 July 1984.

Climate data for Walkamin (17º07'48"S, 145º25'48"E, 594 m AMSL) (1965-2024 normals and extremes)
Month	Jan	Feb	Mar	Apr	May	Jun	Jul	Aug	Sep	Oct	Nov	Dec	Year
Record high °C (°F)	39.8 (103.6)	36.5 (97.7)	35.0 (95.0)	32.6 (90.7)	31.5 (88.7)	32.0 (89.6)	31.7 (89.1)	33.9 (93.0)	35.8 (96.4)	38.8 (101.8)	39.8 (103.6)	38.3 (100.9)	39.8 (103.6)
Mean daily maximum °C (°F)	29.9 (85.8)	29.2 (84.6)	28.2 (82.8)	26.7 (80.1)	25.0 (77.0)	23.6 (74.5)	23.4 (74.1)	24.8 (76.6)	27.1 (80.8)	29.4 (84.9)	30.6 (87.1)	30.7 (87.3)	27.4 (81.3)
Mean daily minimum °C (°F)	20.4 (68.7)	20.5 (68.9)	19.7 (67.5)	18.2 (64.8)	16.2 (61.2)	14.0 (57.2)	13.1 (55.6)	13.4 (56.1)	14.8 (58.6)	16.8 (62.2)	18.6 (65.5)	19.8 (67.6)	17.1 (62.8)
Record low °C (°F)	14.1 (57.4)	12.6 (54.7)	11.3 (52.3)	9.9 (49.8)	5.6 (42.1)	3.4 (38.1)	2.6 (36.7)	3.6 (38.5)	7.7 (45.9)	8.9 (48.0)	10.3 (50.5)	12.6 (54.7)	2.6 (36.7)
Average precipitation mm (inches)	234.6 (9.24)	244.9 (9.64)	205.4 (8.09)	54.6 (2.15)	27.0 (1.06)	18.1 (0.71)	13.7 (0.54)	10.6 (0.42)	8.7 (0.34)	22.8 (0.90)	68.2 (2.69)	132.0 (5.20)	1,043.9 (41.10)
Average precipitation days (≥ 1.0 mm)	13.4	14.6	12.4	8.4	5.6	3.8	2.8	2.4	2.0	3.2	5.5	9.7	83.8
Mean monthly sunshine hours	210.8	172.3	204.6	216.0	223.2	222.0	238.7	263.5	276.0	297.6	267.0	244.9	2,836.6
Percentage possible sunshine	52	48	54	62	64	67	69	74	77	77	69	60	64
Source: Bureau of Meteorology (1965-2024 normals and extremes)

== History ==
The name Walkamin was taken from its railway station, which in turn was named by the Queensland Railways Department on 8 November 1943, based on a suggestion by organist Sydney Lionel May who proposed it because it was the name of an Aboriginal language associated with the area, probably the Wakaman language documented by Norman Tindale.

Walkamin State School opened on 19 May 1958. In 1982 the school celebrated its 25th anniversary.

The Walkamin Research Station was established by the Queensland Government in late 1959 to investigate the economic use of irrigation water from the Tinaroo Dam.

== Demographics ==
In the 2006 census, the locality of Walkamin and the surrounding area had a population of 630 people.

In the 2016 census, the locality of Walkamin had a population of 474 people.

In the 2021 census, the locality of Walkamin had a population of 532 people.

== Education ==
Walkamin State School is a government primary (Prep-6) school for boys and girls at 40 Wattle Street (17.1282°S 145.4269°E). In 2016, the school had an enrolment of 51 students with 3 teachers and 6 non-teaching staff (3 full-time equivalent). In 2018, the school had an enrolment of 45 students with 3 teachers and 6 non-teaching staff (3 full-time equivalent).

There are no secondary schools in Walkamin. The nearest government secondary schools are Atherton State High School in Atherton to the south-east and Mareeba State High School in neighbouring Mareeba to the north. There are also non-government schools in Atherton and Mareeba.

== Economy ==
In 2017, Walkamin Research Station was involved in research involving local crops such as mangoes, peanuts, coffee, hardwoods, legumes, maize and lucerne. Although the research station is equipped for aquaculture research, there were no aquaculture projects in 2017. The research station has an experimental farm in Kairi beside the shores of Lake Tinarooo.

== Attractions ==
The Mount Uncle Distillery makes a range of liqueurs from local fruits. In 2015, the distillery were successful at the International Wine and Spirit Competition in Hong Kong, winning a gold medal for their Iridium rum, silver medals for their gin, vodka and whiskey, and a bronze medal for another rum. The distillery owner, Mark Watkins, believes the climate in Walkamin contributes to faster maturation of the liqueurs.

The FNQ Country Music Festival and Talent Search is held annually at Kerribee Park Rodeo Grounds in Mareeba. The event is hosted by the Walkamin Country Music Club.
