= Hann Tableland National Park =

National park in Queensland, Australia

- IUCN category II (national park)
- Location within Queensland
- Location: Queensland
- Nearest city: Mareeba
- Coordinates: 16°47′54″S 145°09′03″E
- Area: 108.2 km^{2} (41.8 sq mi)
- Established: 1989
- Governing body: Queensland Parks and Wildlife Service

Hann Tableland is a national park in Far North Queensland (Australia), 1,436 km northwest of Brisbane. It is located in the northern section of Paddys Green, a locality in the Tablelands Region local government area. It was first set aside as national park in 1989 and nearly doubled in size with an expansion in 2004.

The park is located within the Einasleigh Uplands bioregion and the Mitchell River water catchment area.

The national park was established to conserve the forests of the Hann Tableland mountain range. Three rare or threatened species have been identified within the Hann Tableland National Park. These are northern greater glider, northern quoll, and buff-breasted button-quail. It lacks visitor facilities with the exception of the Bicentennial National Trail.

The average elevation of the terrain is 522 metres.

== See also ==
- Protected areas of Queensland (Australia)
