= Arriga, Queensland =

Arriga
- Suburb
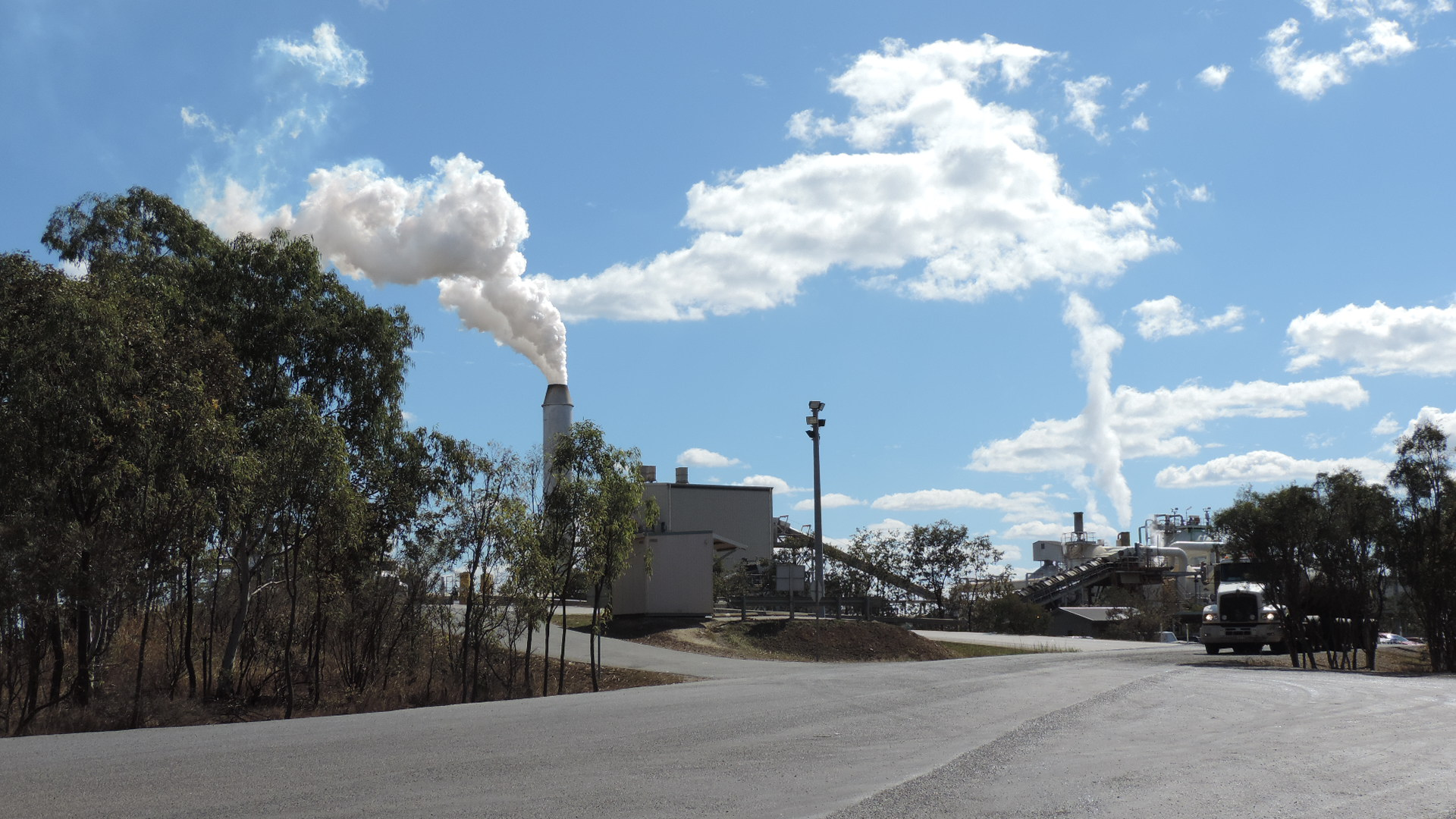
- Tableland Sugar Mill, 2016

- Interactive map of Arriga
- Coordinates: 17.0805°S 145.3161°E
- Country: Australia
- State: Queensland
- LGA: Shire of Mareeba
- Location: 17.2 km (10.7 mi) W of Mareeba; 79.4 km (49.3 mi) W of Cairns; 1,751 km (1,088 mi) NNW of Brisbane

Government
  - State electorates: Cook; Hill
  - Federal division: Kennedy

Area
  - Total: 205.7 km^{2} (79.4 sq mi)

Population
  - Total: 1,323 (2021 census)
  - Density: 6.432/km^{2} (16.658/sq mi)
- Time zone: UTC+10:00 (AEST)
- Postcode: 4880
Suburbs around Arriga
Thornborough	Glen Russell	Paddys Green
Mutchilba	Arriga	Chewko
Mutchilba	Tolga	Walkamin

Arriga is a rural locality in the Shire of Mareeba, Queensland, Australia. It has Queensland's largest wind farm. In the 2021 census, Arriga had a population of 1,323 people.

== Geography ==
The Great Dividing Range passes through the south and east of the locality, with the following mountains within the locality:

- Mount White (17.1204°S 145.2394°E) 764 metres (2,507 ft)
- Walsh Bluff (17.1442°S 145.3615°E) 907 metres (2,976 ft)

The Mareeba Dimbula Road enters the locality from the north-west (Paddys Green) and exits to the west (Mutchilba).

== History ==
The Tableland Sugar Mill started operation on 28 June 1998. It was the first new sugar mill in Queensland for 75 years and the most technologically advanced making extensive use of automation and being environmentally-friendly.

The Mount Emerald Wind Farm commenced generating wind energy from its 53 wind turbines in August 2019.

== Demographics ==
In the 2011 census, Arriga had a population of 702 people.

In the 2016 census, Arriga had a population of 1,079 people.

In the 2021 census, Arriga had a population of 1,323 people.

== Economy ==
The Tableland Sugar Mill is located in Arriga (17.1197°S 145.3453°E).

The Mount Emerald Wind Farm (17.182°S 145.381°E) on the Great Dividing Range is in the south of the locality.

The Lotus Glen Correctional Centre is in Chettle Road (17.113°S 145.364°E).

== Education ==
There are no schools in Arriga. The nearest government primary schools are Mutchilba State School in neighbouring Mutchilba to the south-west and Mareeba State School in Mareeba to the north-east. The nearest government secondary school is Mareeba State High School, also in Mareeba.

== See also ==
- List of sugar mills in Queensland
