= Chewko =

- Suburb
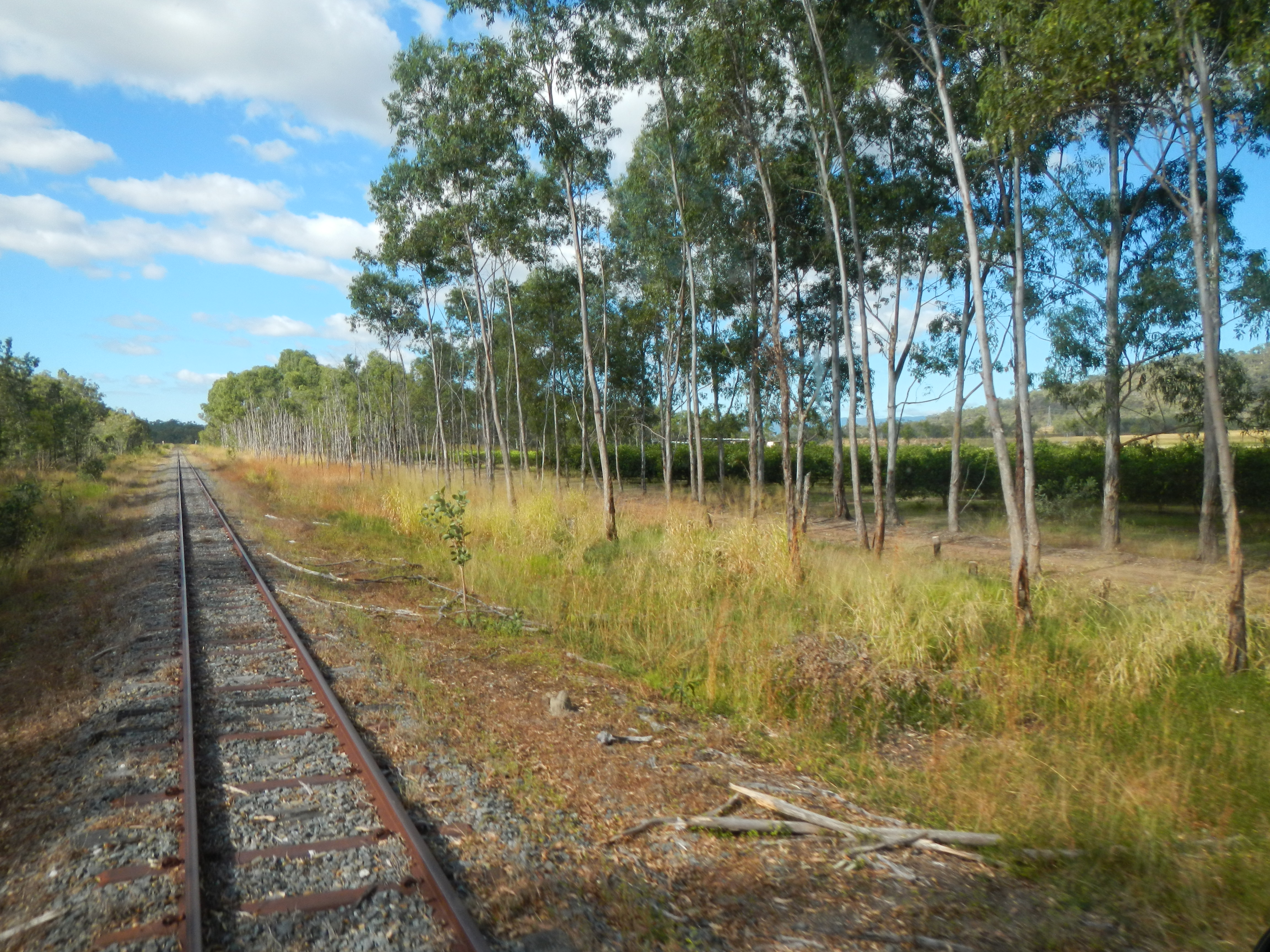
- Chewko, along the Tablelands railway line, 2013

- Interactive map of Chewko
- Coordinates: 17.0711°S 145.37°E
- Country: Australia
- State: Queensland
- LGA: Shire of Mareeba
- Location: 13.6 km (8.5 mi) SW of Mareeba; 75.2 km (46.7 mi) WSW of Cairns; 382 km (237 mi) NNW of Townsville; 1,855 km (1,153 mi) NNW of Brisbane

Government
  - State electorates: Cook; Hill
  - Federal division: Kennedy

Area
  - Total: 42.2 km^{2} (16.3 sq mi)

Population
  - Total: 213 (2021 census)
  - Density: 5.047/km^{2} (13.07/sq mi)
- Time zone: UTC+10:00 (AEST)
- Postcode: 4880
Suburbs around Chewko
Arriga	Paddys Green	Mareeba
Arriga	Chewko	Mareeba
Arriga	Walkamin	Walkamin

Chewko is a rural locality in the Shire of Mareeba, Queensland, Australia. In the 2021 census, Chewko had a population of 213 people.

== Geography ==
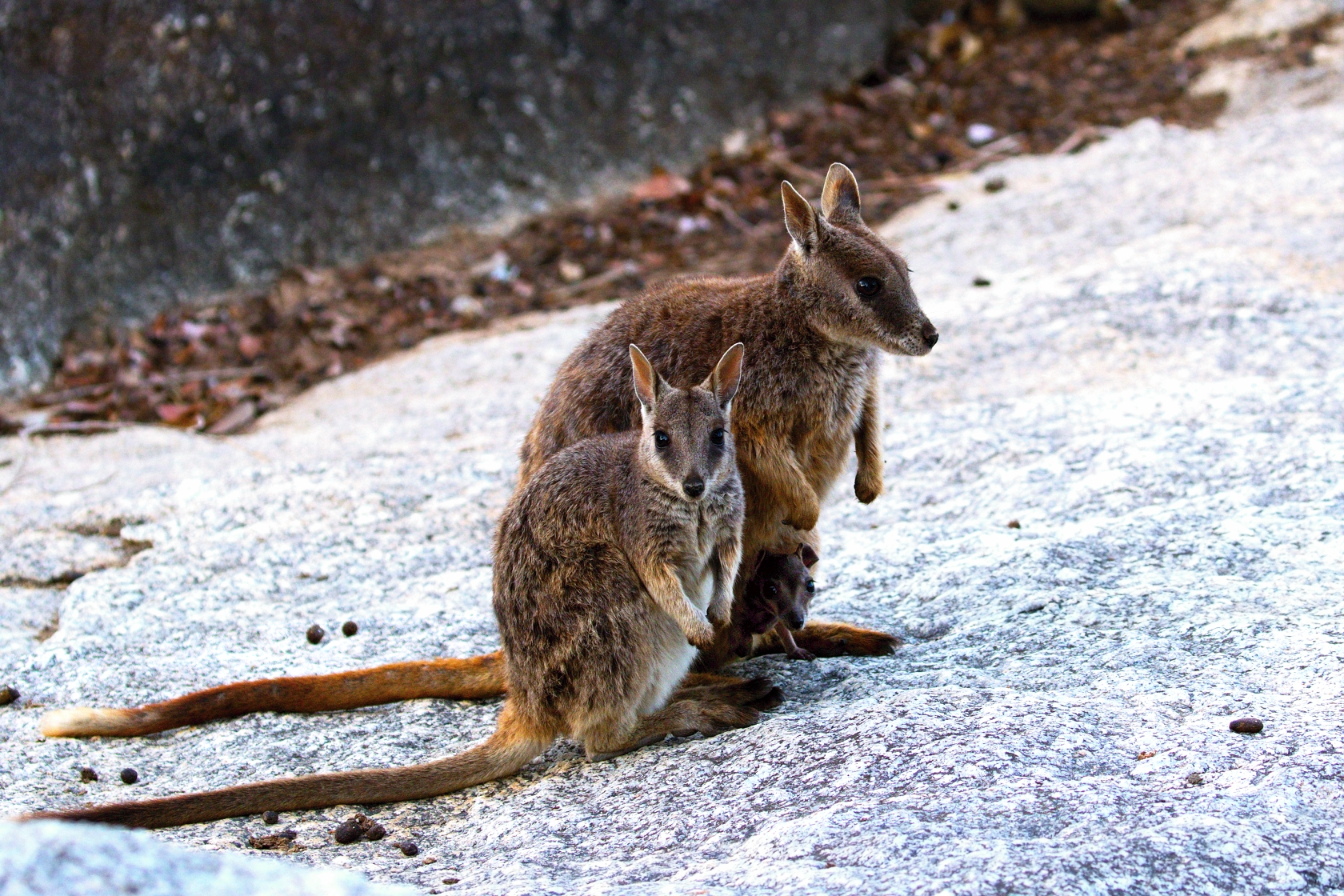
Mareeba rock wallabies

Chewko has the following mountains:

- Mount Abbot (17.0355°S 145.3763°E) 601 metres (1,972 ft)
- Mount Aunt (17.0901°S 145.3868°E) 765 metres (2,510 ft)
- Mount Uncle (17.1090°S 145.3774°E) 754 metres (2,474 ft)

Chewko railway station is on the Tablelands railway line (17.0734°S 145.3740°E).

== Demographics ==
In the 2016 census Chewko had a population of 194 people.

In the 2021 census, Chewko had a population of 213 people.

== Education ==
There are no schools in Chewko. The nearest government primary schools are Mareeba State School in neighbouring Mareeba to the north-east and Walkamin State School in neighbouring Walkamin to the south-east. The nearest government secondary school is Mareeba State High School in Mareeba.

== Attractions ==
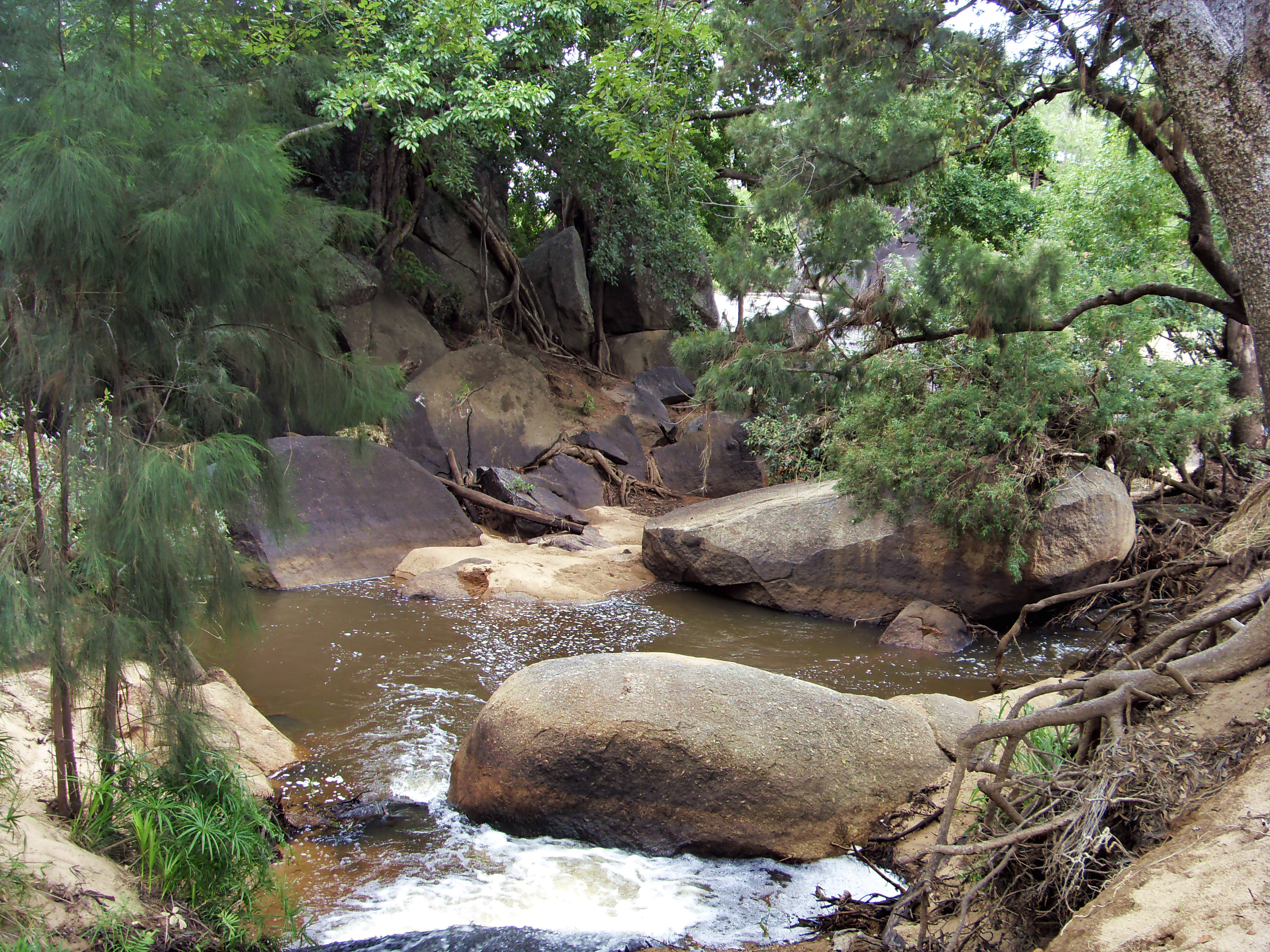
Granite boulders, Granite Gorge Nature Park, 2008

Granite Gorge Nature Park is known for its large granite rock formations and Mareeba rock wallabies. It is at 332 Paglietta Road (17.0421°S 145.3512°E).
