= Paddys Green, Queensland =

Paddys Green
- Suburb
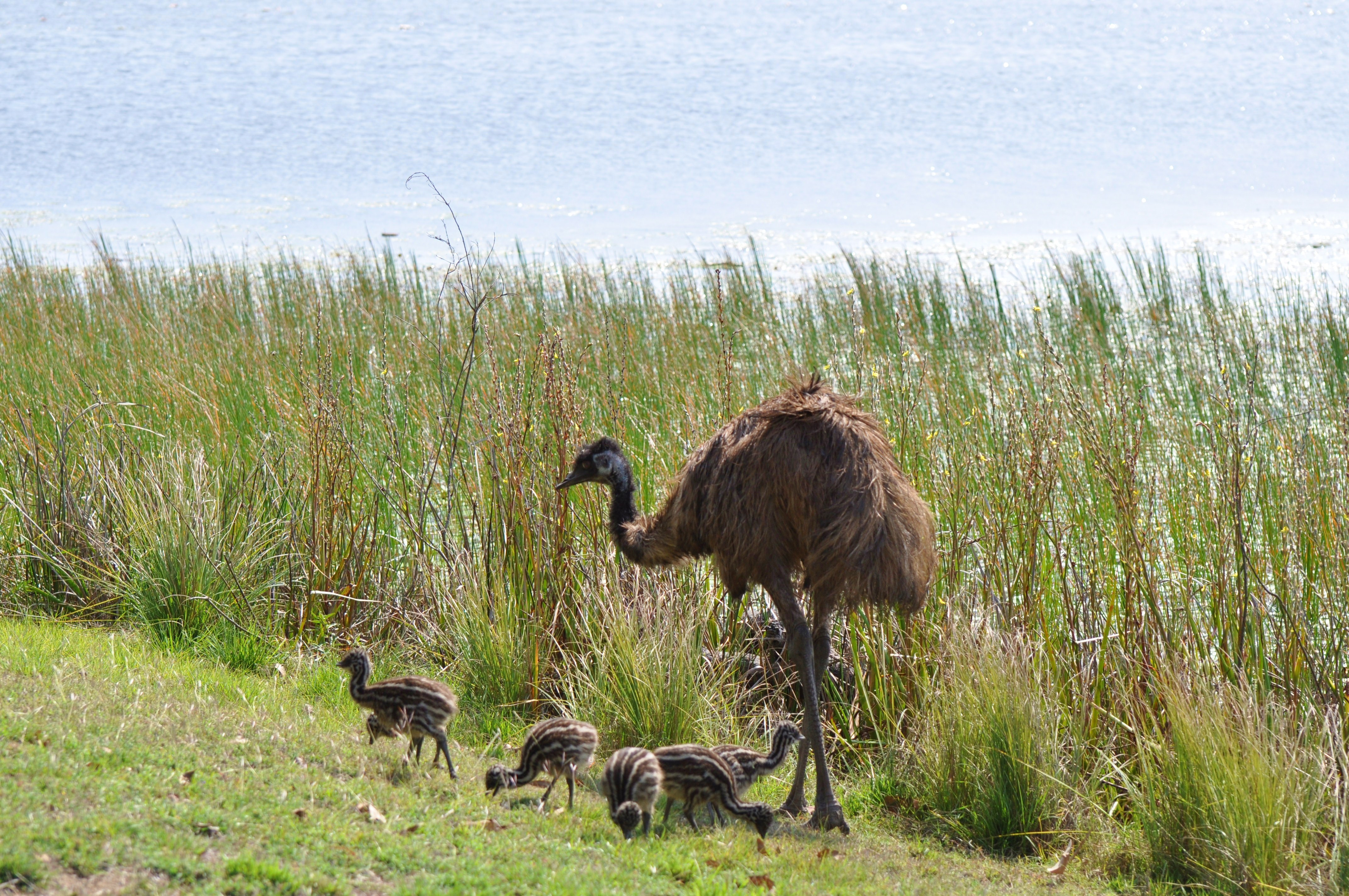
- Emu with chicks, at a wild bird refuge, 2011

- Interactive map of Paddys Green
- Coordinates: 16.9108°S 145.2630°E
- Country: Australia
- State: Queensland
- LGA: Shire of Mareeba
- Location: 10.3 km (6.4 mi) W of Mareeba; 42.0 km (26.1 mi) N of Atherton; 72.6 km (45.1 mi) WSW of Cairns; 1,753 km (1,089 mi) NNW of Brisbane

Government
  - State electorate: Cook
  - Federal division: Kennedy

Area
  - Total: 217.5 km^{2} (84.0 sq mi)

Population
  - Total: 405 (2021 census)
  - Density: 1.8621/km^{2} (4.823/sq mi)
- Time zone: UTC+10:00 (AEST)
- Postcode: 4880
Suburbs around Paddys Green
Mount Mulligan	Southedge	Biboohra
Glen Russell	Paddys Green	Mareeba
Arriga	Arriga	Chewko

Paddys Green is a rural locality in the Shire of Mareeba, Queensland, Australia. In the 2021 census, Paddys Green had a population of 405 people.

== Geography ==
Granite Creek forms the south-eastern boundary.

Mareeba - Dimbulah Road (State Route 27) enters the locality from the east (Mareeba) and exits to the south-west (Arriga). It loosely follows the ridgeline of the Great Dividing Range.

Hann Tableland National Park is in the north-west of the locality.

Apart from the national park, the land use is a mixture of grazing on native vegetation, growing tropical fruit (such as mangoes, avocados, lychees) and sugarcane, and rural residential housing.

== Demographics ==
In the 2016 census, Paddys Green had a population of 361 people.

In the 2021 census, Paddys Green had a population of 405 people.

== Education ==
There are no schools in Paddy Green. The nearest government primary schools are Mareeba State School in neighbouring Mareeba to the east and Biboohra State School in neighbouring Biboohra to the north-east. The nearest government secondary school is Mareeba State High School in Mareeba.
