= Harriett Brims =

Australian commercial photographer

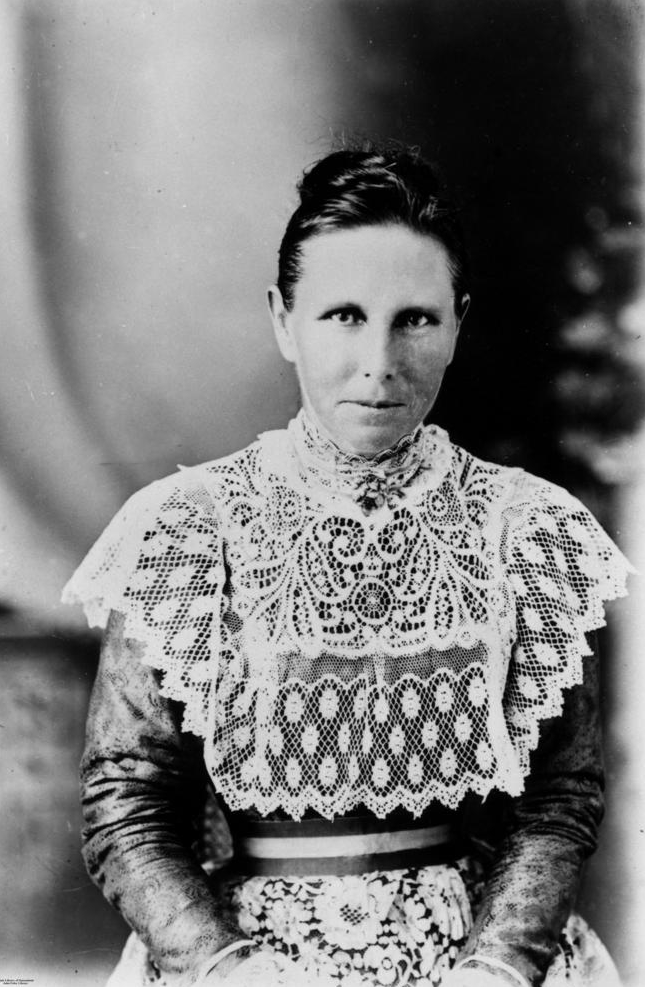
Self portrait of Harriett Pettifore Brims (1864-1939), Australian photographer

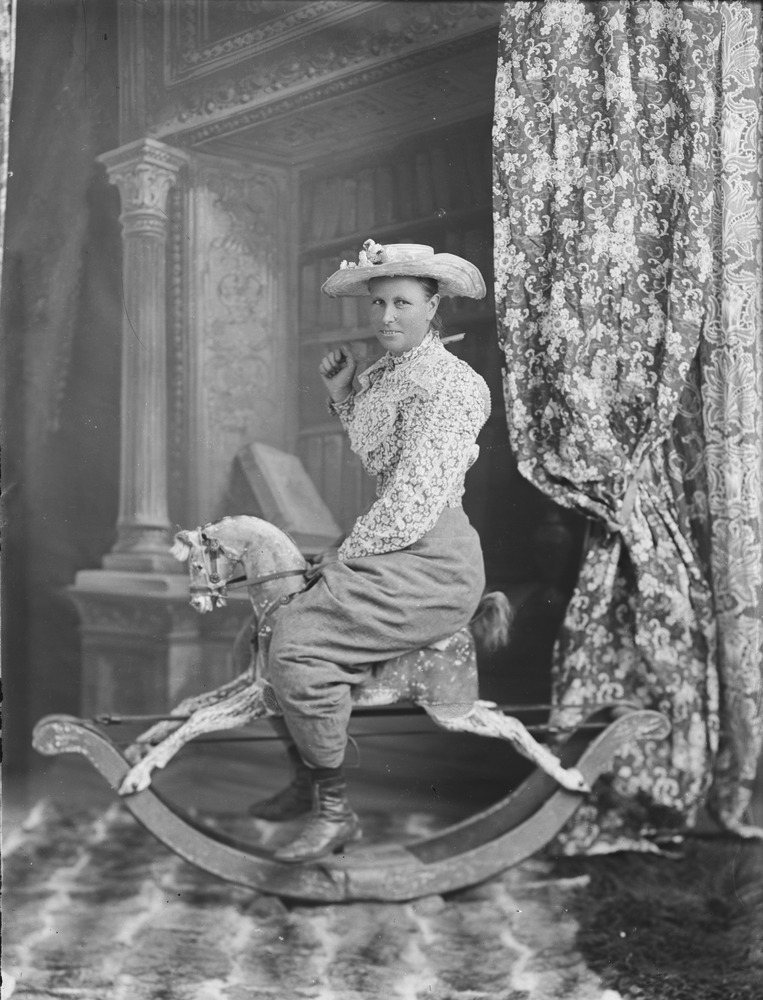
Self portrait on a rocking horse

Harriet Pettifore Brims (1864–1939) was a pioneer female commercial photographer in Queensland, Australia. She opened a photographic studio in Ingham, Queensland before moving to Mareeba in 1904, where she established a new studio until she moved to Brisbane in 1914. Her photographic work provides information on people and places in the pioneer days of North Queensland.

She was featured in the Magnificent Makers exhibition at the State Library of Queensland in 2018.
