= Lotus Glen Correctional Centre =

Australian prison facility

Coordinates: 17°06′47″S 145°21′50″E

- Interactive map of Lotus Glen Correctional Centre
- Location: Mareeba, Queensland
- Status: Operational
- Security class: High, Medium, Low and Open Security. (Male Only)
- Capacity: Main – 396; Farm (Open Security) – 115
- Opened: 1989
- Managed by: Queensland Corrective Services

Lotus Glen Correctional Centre is an Australian prison facility located 14 km south of Mareeba and 20 km north of Atherton in the locality of Arriga in Far North Queensland. Lotus Glen provides a correctional service for high, medium, low and open classification inmates, including a Prison Farm with a capacity for 115 "open security" inmates.

The shoulder patch worn by guards at Lotus Glen.

== Allegations of improper land dealings ==
The purchase of the Lotus Glen pastoral station near Mareeba in north Queensland as a prison site became a subject of political controversy in the mid 1980s. In Queensland Parliamentary debates from 1986–1987, opposition members alleged improper political influence in the selection and purchase of the site. Specifically, claims were made that the land was purchased through a National Party member despite more suitable locations reportedly being available closer to Cairns.

Opposition member for Townsville West, Geoff Smith, during parliamentary debates on 4 September 1986, questioned the involvement of a company called Izaria Pty Ltd in the transaction, and suggested there was "heavy political intervention" in the site selection process. When the Premier was asked about the beneficiaries of the company that sold the land, he reportedly denied knowledge of the sale and denied influencing the site selection.

The controversy resurfaced during later parliamentary debates about prison locations in April 1987, where opposition members drew explicit parallels between Lotus Glen and other dubious government land purchases. Local residents were cited as believing there was evidence of political interference, and opposition members suggested this case fit a broader pattern of government land deals that appeared to benefit private interests with political connections. Opposition member Wayne Goss, while criticizing another prison project, described the Lotus Glen situation as part of what he characterized as problematic government procurement practices.

== Population ==
Lotus Glen's "catchment area" for its inmate population includes Cairns, The Cape York Region, The Torres Strait Islands and other isolated communities. The centre has a total capacity of 498 (398 within the secure unit and 100 at the centre's farm). Generally, 60%–70% of the population of the centre are Aboriginal and Torres Strait Islander persons.

== Facilities ==
The centre is used as a remand and reception facility and provides the programs necessary to induct both first time inmates and repeat offenders into the correctional environment. The facility runs work programs in the fields of both farming and industry, providing useful skills to the inmates in preparation for their release.

Facilities are being expanded to house 300 secure cells and 24 low-security farm beds at a cost of A$445 million. The new buildings have been built outside the existing secure area and are expected to be completed by December 2011.

== Programs ==
Cultural programs are conducted at Lotus Glen in response to the centre's high Indigenous population. Specialist Aboriginal and Torres Strait Islander staff including correctional officers are employed to meet the needs of the Aboriginal and Torres Strait Islander prisoners. These needs are met through cultural programs, Elder visits, regular community visits, and ensuring that family ties are maintained.

The facility also runs a prison farm for low and open security inmates.The Lotus Glen Prison Farm, Queensland's largest low-custody correctional facility, sits on approximately 2,500 acres about 100 kilometers west of Cairns. Established in 1986, it accommodates 134 prisoners who work across various agricultural operations including a cattle program raising Brahman/Droughtmaster cross cattle known for their exceptionally quiet temperament, aquaponics systems producing barramundi and vegetables, and a eucalyptus plantation with 15,000 trees. The farm serves multiple purposes: providing prisoners with valu agricultural skills and vocational certifications, generating approximately $100,000 annually through cattle sales, barramundi for restocking Lake Tinaroo, and eucalyptus leaves for koalas at wildlife parks. This prison farm is located "immediately beside the high security prison."

In 2017, due to a new program of medication, Lotus Glen became Australia's first Hepatitis C-free prison.

== See also ==
- List of Australian prisons
