= Aron Baynes =

Australian basketball player (born 1986)

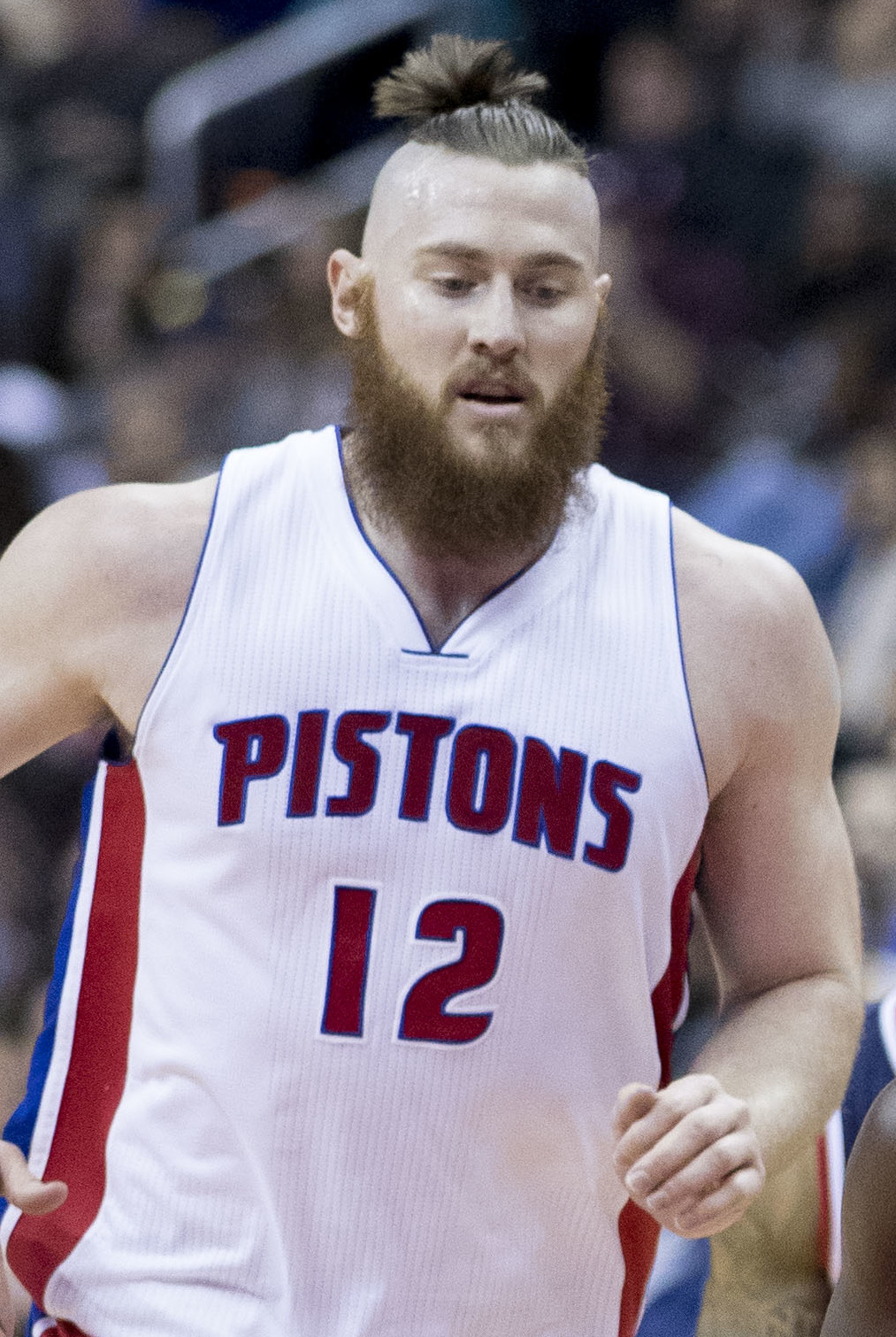
- Baynes with the Detroit Pistons in 2016

Personal information
- Born: 9 December 1986 (age 39) Gisborne, New Zealand
- Listed height: 208 cm (6 ft 10 in)
- Listed weight: 118 kg (260 lb)

Career information
- High school: Mareeba State (Mareeba, Queensland); Cairns State (Cairns, Queensland)
- College: Washington State (2005–2009)
- NBA draft: 2009: undrafted
- Playing career: 2009–2024
- Position: Center / power forward
- Number: 11, 12, 16, 31, 46

Career history
- 2009–2010: Lietuvos rytas
- 2010–2011: Oldenburg
- 2011–2012: Ikaros
- 2012–2013: Olimpija
- 2013–2015: San Antonio Spurs
- 2013: →Austin Toros
- 2015–2017: Detroit Pistons
- 2017–2019: Boston Celtics
- 2019–2020: Phoenix Suns
- 2020–2021: Toronto Raptors
- 2022–2024: Brisbane Bullets

Career highlights
- NBA champion (2014); Slovenian Cup champion (2013); Slovenian Supercup champion (2013); Greek League rebounding leader (2012); All-Greek League Second Team (2012); LKL champion (2010); Lithuanian Cup winner (2010); LKL Slam Dunk Contest champion (2010)
- Stats at NBA.com
- Stats at Basketball Reference

Aron John Baynes (born 9 December 1986) is an Australian former professional basketball player. He played college basketball for Washington State University before starting his professional career in Europe. In 2013, he joined the San Antonio Spurs, and a year later, won an NBA championship with the Spurs. He has also played with the Detroit Pistons, Boston Celtics, Phoenix Suns and Toronto Raptors. In the National Basketball League (NBL), he played for the Brisbane Bullets between 2022 and 2024. Baynes also played for the Australian national team.

== Early life ==
Baynes was born in Gisborne, New Zealand to New Zealand parents in 1986. His family moved to the small Australian town of Mareeba, Queensland when he was three years of age. He grew up playing rugby league in Far North Queensland while attending Mareeba State High School until the age of 15 when his older brother, Callum, introduced him to basketball. As a result, Baynes decided to focus on pursuing a career in basketball and subsequently quit rugby league. Shortly after high school graduation, he joined the Australian Institute of Sport in 2004–05 and accepted a college scholarship offer from Tony Bennett to play for Washington State University in 2006. During his college career under Bennett, Washington State tied the school wins record twice consecutively, going 26–8 in 2006–07 and 26–9 in 2007–08.

== Professional career ==
=== Europe (2009–2013) ===
On 29 May 2009, Baynes signed a two-year deal with Lietuvos Rytas of the Lithuanian Basketball League. In July 2009, he played for the Los Angeles Lakers' Summer League team. Following the 2009–10 season, he parted ways with Lietuvos Rytas.

On 15 July 2010, Baynes signed a two-year deal with EWE Baskets Oldenburg of the German Basketball Bundesliga. In 40 games for Oldenburg in 2010–11, he averaged 6.8 points and 3.7 rebounds per game. On 29 June 2011, he parted ways with Oldenburg.

On 24 August 2011, Baynes signed a one-year deal with Ikaros Kallitheas of the Greek Basket League.

On 1 August 2012, Baynes signed a one-year deal with Union Olimpija of the Slovenian Basketball League. On 5 January 2013, he played his final game for Olimpija, as he later left the team in pursuit of an NBA contract.

=== San Antonio Spurs (2013–2015) ===
On 23 January 2013, Baynes signed with the San Antonio Spurs. In his second NBA game, Baynes recorded seven points, nine rebounds and one block in a 102–78 win over the Charlotte Bobcats. During the 2012–13 season, he was assigned multiple times to the Austin Toros of the NBA G League. He made his first NBA start in Game 4 of the Spurs' first-round playoff match-up against the Los Angeles Lakers, and was tasked with defending Dwight Howard. The Spurs went on to reach the 2013 NBA Finals but lost the series in seven games to the Miami Heat.

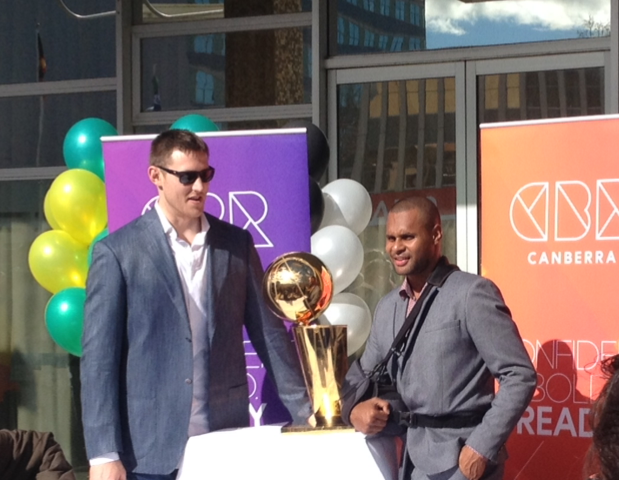
Baynes (left) and teammate Patty Mills in July 2014, with the NBA Championship trophy.

On 1 December 2013, Baynes was reassigned to the Austin Toros. He was recalled on 2 December, reassigned on 8 December, and recalled again on 9 December. On 6 May 2014, he recorded playoff career-high numbers of 10 points and seven rebounds in a 116–92 win over the Portland Trail Blazers in Game 1 of the Western Conference semi-finals. Baynes went on to help the Spurs defeat the Miami Heat 4–1 in the 2014 NBA Finals to claim his first NBA championship.

On 26 September 2014, Baynes re-signed with the Spurs. On 20 December 2014, he scored a then career-high 16 points while starting in place of Tim Duncan in a 99–93 loss to the Dallas Mavericks. On 1 April 2015 and 3 April 2015, Baynes had back-to-back 18-point games.

=== Detroit Pistons (2015–2017) ===
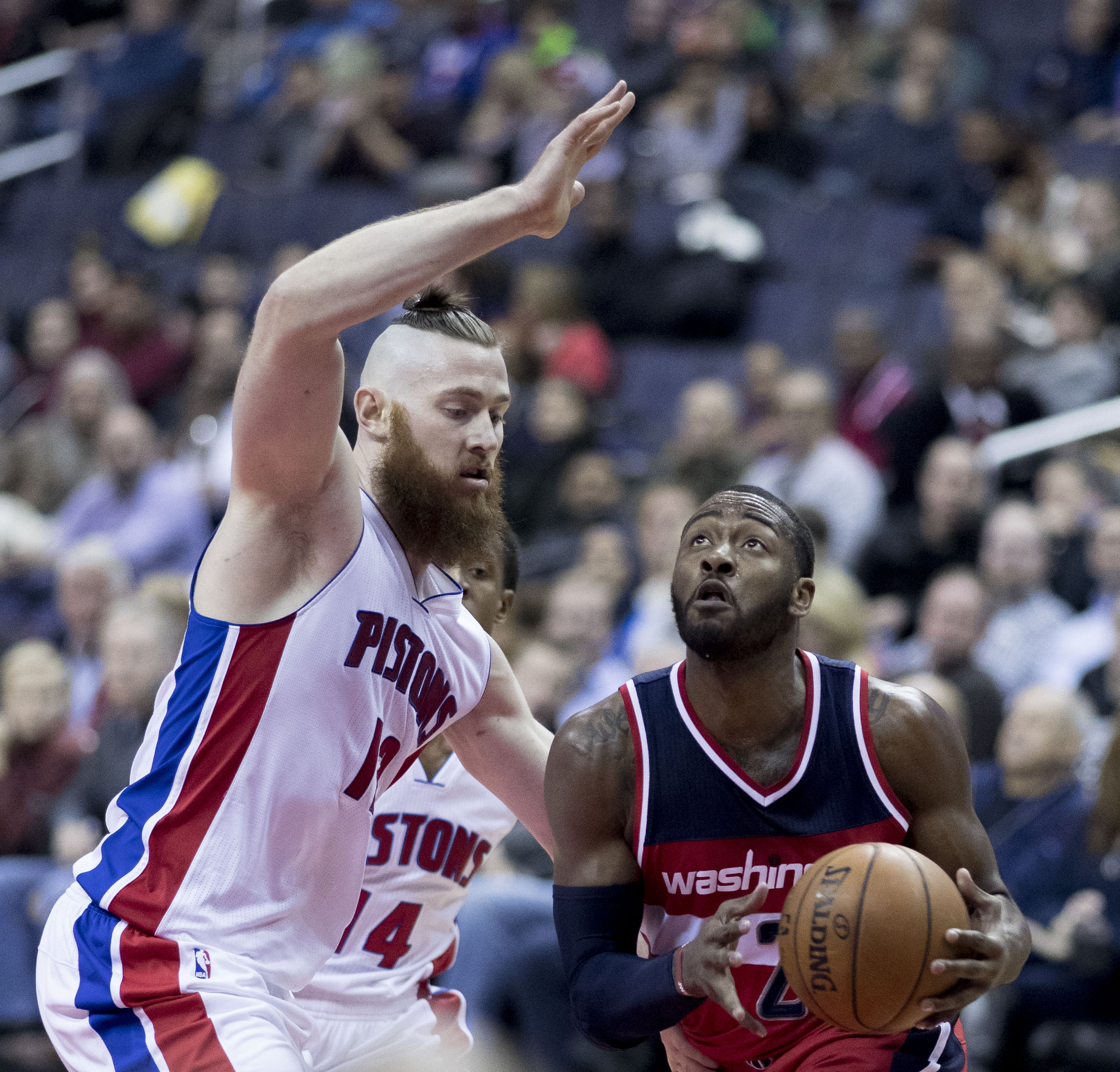
Baynes guards John Wall in 2016

On 12 July 2015, Baynes signed with the Detroit Pistons. On 19 March 2016, he scored a career-high 21 points in a 115–103 win over the Brooklyn Nets.

On 14 November 2016, Baynes scored 20 points against the Oklahoma City Thunder while starting in place of Andre Drummond. On 19 March 2017, Baynes grabbed a career-high 17 rebounds alongside 13 points in a 112–95 win over the Phoenix Suns.

=== Boston Celtics (2017–2019) ===
On 19 July 2017, Baynes signed with the Boston Celtics. In a game against the Charlotte Hornets, Baynes injured Celtics teammate and star point guard Kyrie Irving. On 8 November 2017, he matched his career high with 21 points in a 107–96 win over the Los Angeles Lakers. In the Celtics' regular season finale on 11 April 2018, Baynes led a short-handed Boston lineup with a career-best 26 points and 14 rebounds in a 110–97 win over the Brooklyn Nets.

On 7 July 2018, Baynes re-signed with the Celtics. On 19 December 2018, in a 111–103 loss to the Phoenix Suns, Baynes broke a bone in his left hand. He was subsequently ruled out for four to six weeks. He returned to action on 16 January 2019 against the Toronto Raptors. On 3 February, he was sidelined with a left foot contusion.

=== Phoenix Suns (2019–2020) ===
On 6 July 2019, Baynes, along with the draft rights to Ty Jerome, was traded to the Phoenix Suns for a 2020 protected first-round pick. After Deandre Ayton was suspended for 25 games due to diuretic usage on 24 October, Baynes was promoted to being the team's starting center during that period of time. On 30 October, Baynes recorded 24 points, 12 rebounds, and a career-high 7 assists in a 121–110 win over the Golden State Warriors. On 6 March 2020, Baynes scored 37 points and hit nine three-pointers, both career-highs, along with 16 rebounds, in a 127–117 victory over the Portland Trail Blazers. He not only tied a franchise record for most three-pointers made in a single game, but he also joins James Harden as the only other player to record 35+ points, 15+ rebounds, and 9 three-pointers in a single game.

On 23 June 2020, the Suns reported that two of their own players tested positive for COVID-19. In an interview on 22 July, Baynes revealed himself as one of the two players to test positive for COVID-19. Unlike his other teammate that tested positive, Baynes did not rejoin the team in the 2020 NBA Bubble until after the scrimmage games were finished, making sure he completely tested negative for the virus before entering the bubble. Because of his late entry and subsequent quarantine period, he was not able to play on 31 July against the Washington Wizards. After recovering from the virus, Baynes was later diagnosed with a right knee contusion, leaving him out of action for the rest of the resumed regular season. Despite being out of action for most of the game, Baynes was considered clear to play for the team's last game of the season, but decided against it despite the blowout 128–102 win over the Dallas Mavericks, ending the resumed season with an 8–0 record.

=== Toronto Raptors (2020–2021) ===
On 25 November 2020, the Toronto Raptors signed Baynes to a multi-year contract. On 31 January 2021, Baynes had eight points and a season-high 16 rebounds in a 115–102 win against the Orlando Magic. On 4 August 2021, he was waived by the Raptors.

=== Brisbane Bullets (2022–2024) ===
After suffering a career-threatening spinal cord injury during the Tokyo Olympics, Baynes returned to professional basketball by signing a two-year deal with the Brisbane Bullets of the National Basketball League on 28 July 2022. In a match on October 7, 2023, against Cairns Taipans, Baynes was handed a five-game suspension for unsportsmanlike conduct, unacceptable basketball act and excessive disputing following his ejection from the match. Despite being the highest paid player in the 2023–24 NBL season, at 37 years old, he averaged only 13 minutes a game over the first half of the season.

On 17 October 2024, Baynes announced his retirement from basketball.

== National team career ==
Baynes has played for the Australian national team, the Boomers, at the 2010 FIBA World Championship in Turkey, the 2012 Summer Olympics in London, the 2014 FIBA Basketball World Cup in Spain, the 2016 Summer Olympics in Rio de Janeiro, and the 2019 FIBA Basketball World Cup in China. Baynes was also part of the national team for the 2020 Summer Olympics in Tokyo, but a spinal cord injury ruled him out for the second half of the tournament as the Boomers went on to win the bronze medal.

Baynes' injury at the Tokyo Olympics was much more serious than had initially been reported, and as of January 2022, he was still recovering with hopes of returning to the NBA.

== Career statistics ==
Legend
GP	Games played	GS	Games started	MPG	Minutes per game
FG%	Field goal percentage	3P%	3-point field goal percentage	FT%	Free throw percentage
RPG	Rebounds per game	APG	Assists per game	SPG	Steals per game
BPG	Blocks per game	PPG	Points per game	**Bold**	Career high
†	Won an NBA championship

=== NBA ===
==== Regular season ====
Year	Team	GP	GS	MPG	FG%	3P%	FT%	RPG	APG	SPG	BPG	PPG
2012–13	San Antonio	16	0	8.8	.500	.000	.583	2.0	.3	.1	.4	2.7
2013–14†	San Antonio	53	4	9.3	.436	—	**.905**	2.7	.6	.0	.1	3.0
2014–15	San Antonio	70	17	16.0	**.566**	.250	.865	4.5	.5	.2	.3	6.6
2015–16	Detroit	**81**	1	15.2	.505	.000	.764	4.7	.6	**.3**	.6	6.3
2016–17	Detroit	75	2	15.5	.513	—	.840	4.4	.4	.2	.5	4.9
2017–18	Boston	**81**	**67**	18.3	.471	.143	.756	5.4	1.1	**.3**	.6	6.0
2018–19	Boston	51	18	16.1	.471	.344	.855	4.7	1.1	.2	**.7**	5.6
2019–20	Phoenix	42	28	**22.2**	.480	**.351**	.747	**5.6**	**1.6**	.2	.5	**11.5**
2020–21	Toronto	53	31	18.5	.441	.262	.707	5.2	.9	**.3**	.4	6.1
Career		522	168	16.0	.489	.308	.794	4.6	.8	.2	.5	6.0

==== Playoffs ====
Year	Team	GP	GS	MPG	FG%	3P%	FT%	RPG	APG	SPG	BPG	PPG
2013	San Antonio	4	1	5.8	**.571**	—	—	1.3	.0	.0	.0	2.0
2014†	San Antonio	14	0	7.2	.500	.000	.800	2.2	.0	.2	.0	2.3
2015	San Antonio	4	0	10.0	.300	—	**1.000**	2.5	.3	.0	.0	2.3
2016	Detroit	4	0	11.0	.444	—	.667	2.0	.5	.0	.0	2.5
2018	Boston	**19**	**12**	**20.5**	.506	**.478**	.722	**6.2**	**1.0**	.2	**.6**	**6.0**
2019	Boston	9	5	12.8	**.571**	.333	.500	2.8	.3	**.3**	.3	2.1
Career		54	18	13.2	.497	.433	.750	3.6	.5	.2	.3	3.6

=== College ===
Year	Team	GP	GS	MPG	FG%	3P%	FT%	RPG	APG	SPG	BPG	PPG
2005–06	Washington State	28	12	16.5	.429	.000	.641	4.1	0.1	0.2	0.5	5.2
2006–07	Washington State	26	7	16.4	.495	—	.646	3.1	0.1	0.2	0.4	5.2
2007–08	Washington State	**35**	**34**	24.0	**.600**	.000	.660	6.0	0.3	**0.7**	0.7	10.4
2008–09	Washington State	33	33	**28.8**	.580	**1.000**	**.774**	**7.5**	**0.6**	0.3	**1.3**	**12.7**
Career		122	86	22.0	.546	.333	.698	5.4	0.3	0.3	0.8	8.7

=== EuroLeague ===
Legend
GP	Games played	GS	Games started	MPG	Minutes per game
FG%	Field-goal percentage	3P%	3-point field-goal percentage	FT%	Free-throw percentage
RPG	Rebounds per game	APG	Assists per game	SPG	Steals per game
BPG	Blocks per game	PPG	Points per game	PIR	Performance index rating
**Bold**	Career high

Year	Team	GP	GS	MPG	FG%	3P%	FT%	RPG	APG	SPG	BPG	PPG	PIR
2009–10	Lietuvos Rytas	**10**	8	13.3	.511	.000	.643	3.0	.2	.4	**.9**	5.5	3.0
2012–13	Union Olimpija	**10**	**10**	**26.2**	**.587**	.000	**.698**	**9.8**	**.5**	**.5**	.5	**13.8**	**18.2**
Career		20	18	19.8	.562	.000	.684	6.4	.4	.5	.7	9.7	10.6

== Personal life ==
Baynes's wife, Rachel, is the sister of fellow basketball player, Matthew Adekponya.
