= Mount Emerald Wind Farm =

Wind farm on Mount Emerald, Queensland, Australia

- Country: Australia
- Coordinates: 17°11′S 145°22′E
- Status: Operational
- Construction began: 14 February 2017; 9 years ago
- Commission date: August 2018; 7 years ago
- Construction cost: $400 million
- Owner: RATCH-Australia
- Operator: RATCH-Australia

Wind farm
- Type: Onshore
- Hub height: 84 m (276 ft) Vestas V112; 90 m (295 ft) Vestas V117
- Rotor diameter: 112 m (367 ft); 117 m (384 ft)
- Rated wind speed: 50 km/h (13.9 m/s)
- Site area: 2,400 ha (24 km^{2})
- Site elevation: 900 m (2,953 ft)

Power generation
- Units operational: 16 × 3.3 MW; 37 × 3.45 MW
- Make and model: Vestas V112-3.3MW; Vestas V117-3.45MW
- Nameplate capacity: 180.5 MW
- Annual net output: 500-600 GWh

External links
- Website: mtemeraldwindfarm.com.au

Mount Emerald Wind Farm is a 180 MW wind farm situated on Mount Emerald, in Arriga, Shire of Mareeba, Queensland, Australia. It is approximately 8 km WNW of Tolga, and 49 km SW of Cairns. The project is a joint venture between Port Bajool (land owner) and RATCH-Australia (wind farm developer and operator). RATCH-Australia bought the project from Transfield Services in July 2011. The wind farm incorporates 53 turbines.

== Construction ==
Approval from the state government came in April 2015. Federal government approval happened in November 2015, subject to 35 conditions aimed at protecting native species. The site was formerly used as a military training area in World War II so the site had to be carefully inspected to find any unexpoded ordnance; several were found and safely destroyed.

== Operations ==
The wind farm registered its first grid output in August 2018 and reached maximum output in January 2019. The electricity network around the wind farm is generally constrained; this has an impact on the total amount of electricity it can receive from the wind farm. Studies are being undertaken to increase the capacity of the network using technologies such as synchronous condensers and grid-scale batteries.

Mount Emerald Wind Farm Generation (MWh)
Year	Total	Jan	Feb	Mar	Apr	May	Jun	Jul	Aug	Sep	Oct	Nov	Dec
2018	114,356	N/A	N/A	N/A	N/A	N/A	N/A	N/A	2,239	27,237	19,132	30,535	35,213
2019	455,639	39,124	21,108	33,043	62,106	53,452	45,636	33,884	45,804	40,882	33,083	26,186	21,331
2020	348,260	20,204	10,891	36,588	38,551	48,914	56,223	17,879	14,075	33,172	15,113	37,952	18,698
2021		28,953	14,298	36,514	43,141	52,500	30,136	32,432	63,443	59,085	20,474	25,138	32,015
2022		21,812	23,242	26,568	50,452	29,027	53,770	40,093	51,827	37,556	35,440	27,244	26,171
2023		18,820	28,533	23,251	32,791	58,862	43,962	54,560	56,183	61,325			

== Environmental impact ==
Environmental groups have claimed that the construction of roads and bases for the wind turbines caused significant destruction of the formerly untouched wilderness.

== Photo gallery ==
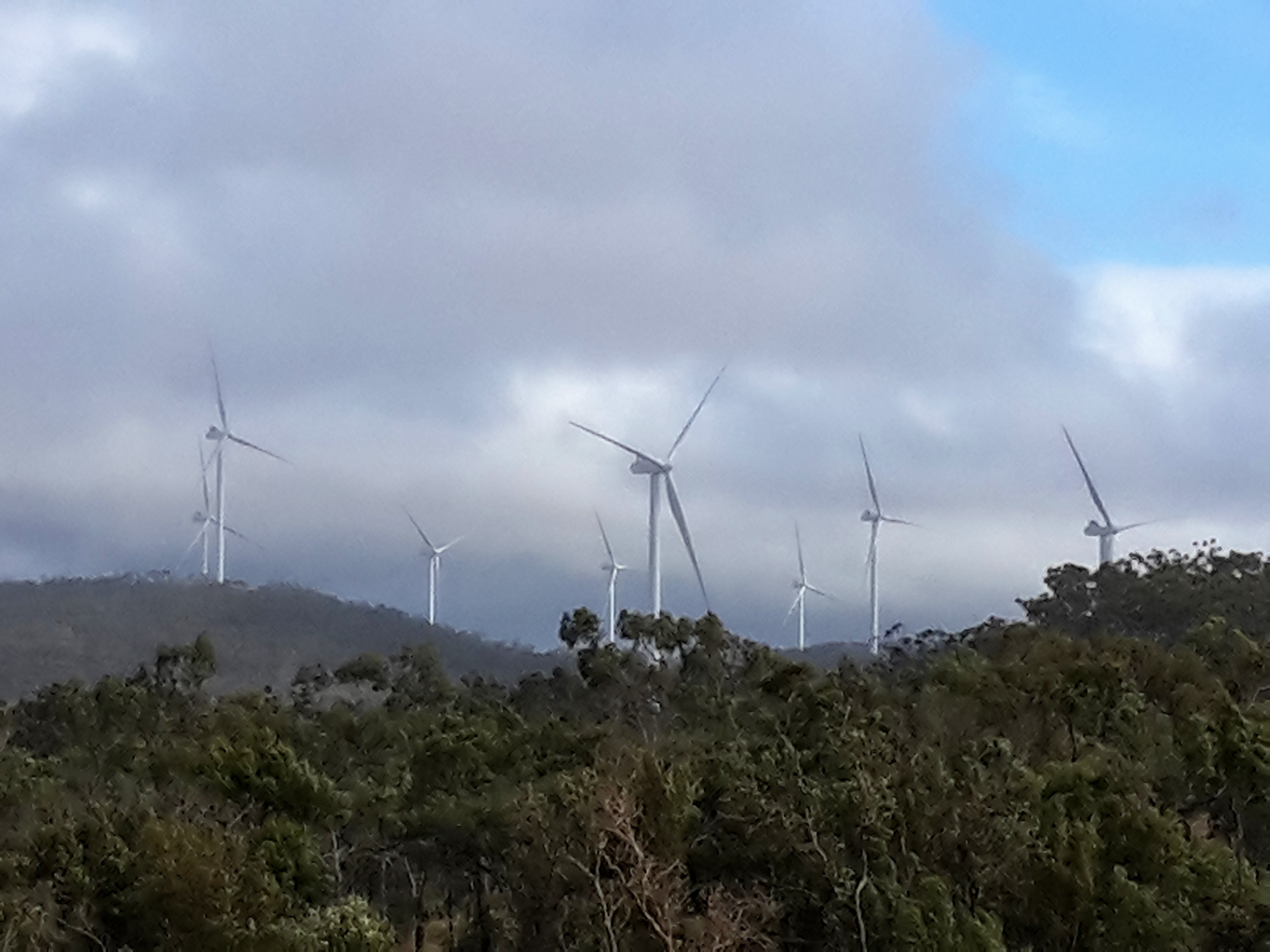
Multiple Wind turbines

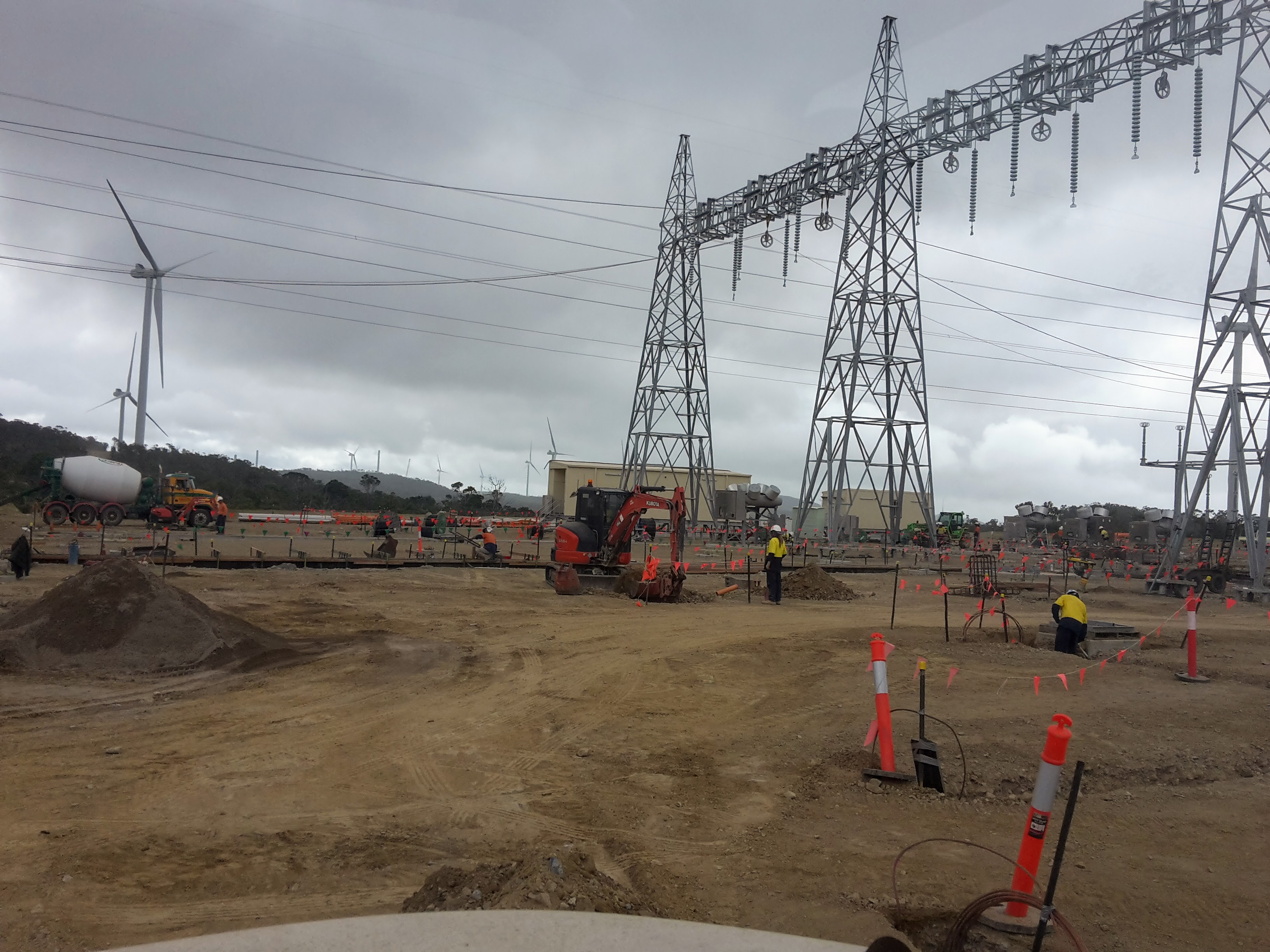
Mount Emerald Wind Farm Substation construction

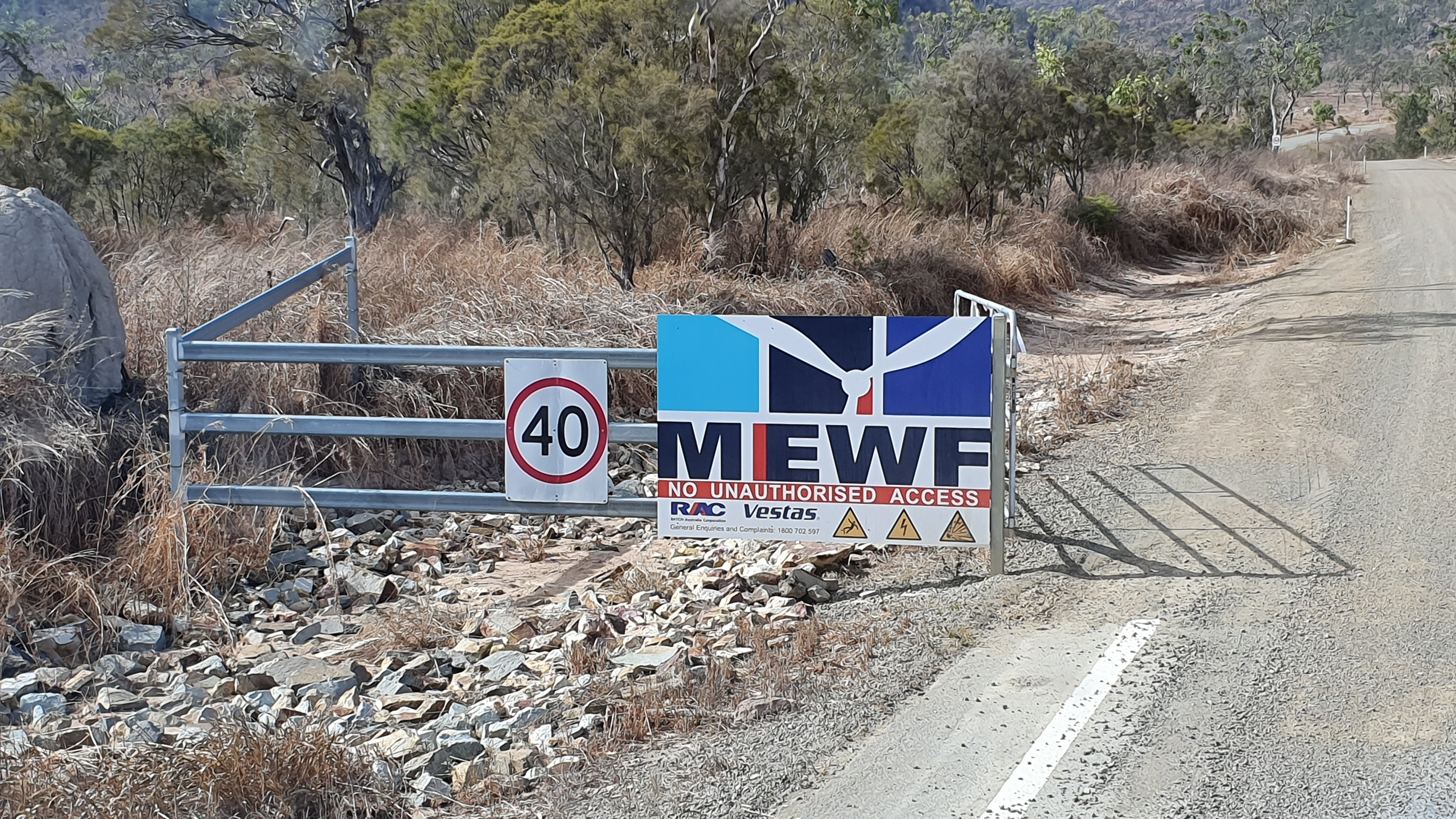
Mount Emerald Wind Farm entry

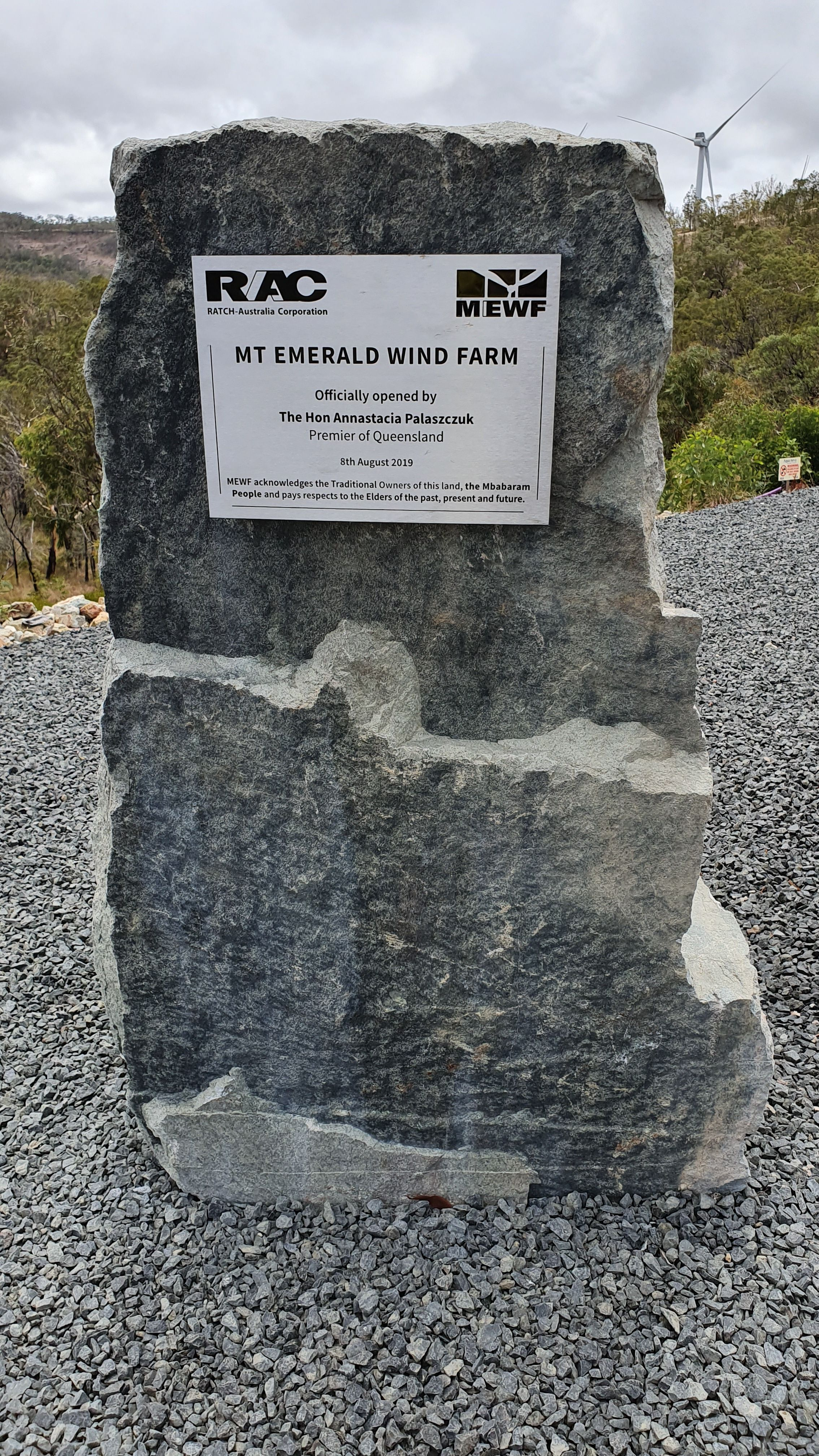
Mount Emerald Wind Farm Opening Plaque

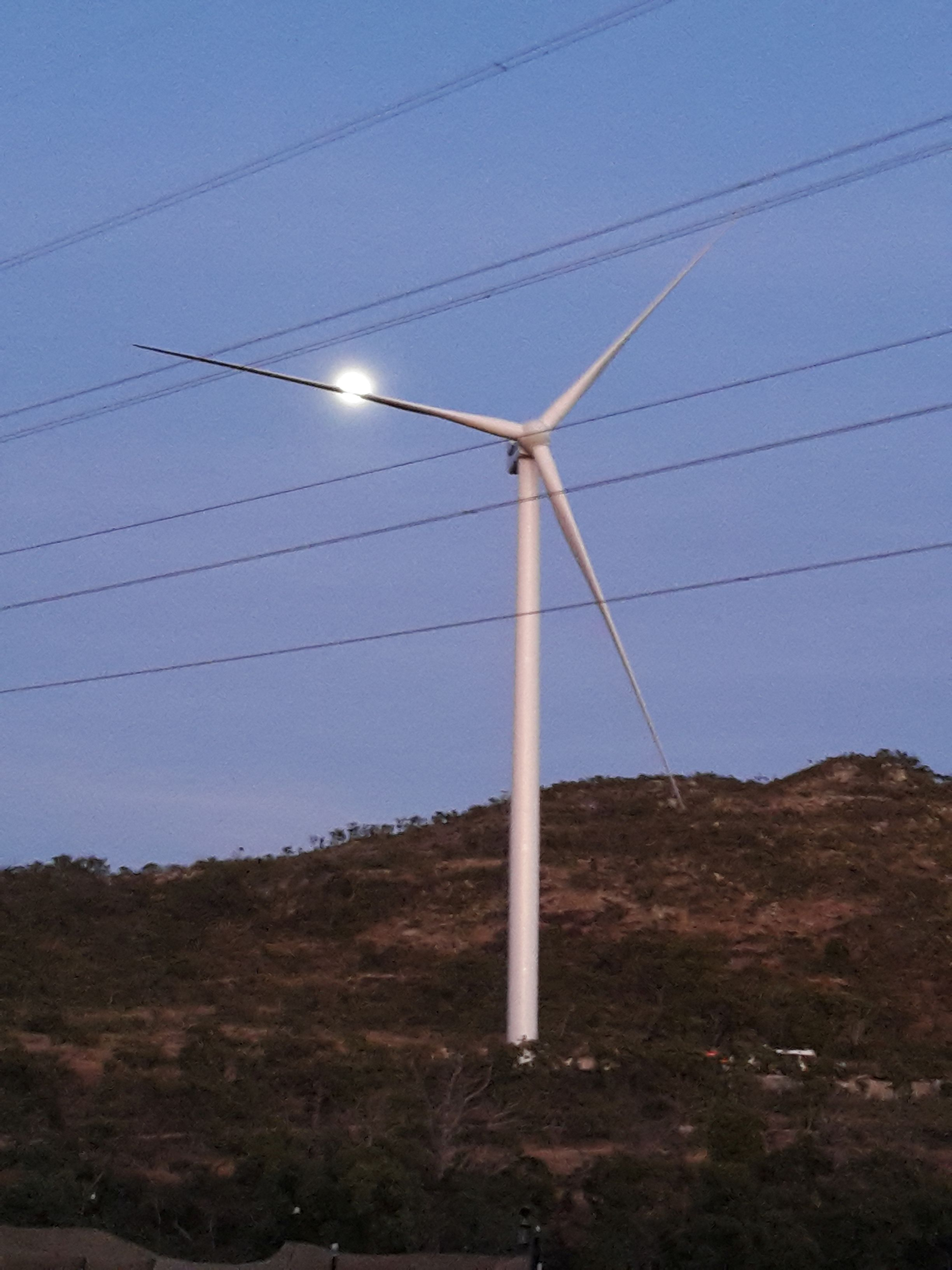
Mount Emerald wind farm turbine and moon

== See also ==
- Wind power in Australia
- List of wind farms in Queensland
