= Assay Office, Mareeba =

Heritage building in Queensland, Australia

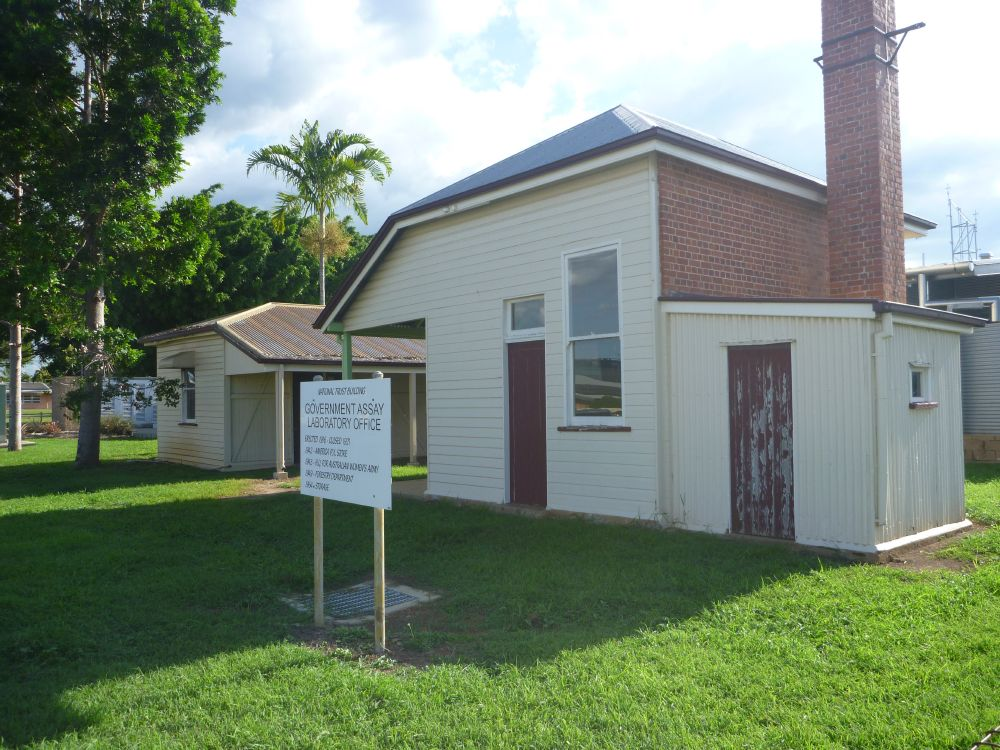
- Assay Office & Store, 2016

- Location within Queensland Location within Australia
- 16.9952°S 145.4249°E
- Location: 167 Walsh Street, Mareeba, Shire of Mareeba, Queensland, Australia

History
- Design period: 1914–1919 (World War I)
- Built: 1916–1917

Queensland Heritage Register
- Official name: Assay Office & Store, Mareeba, Forestry Office
- Type: state heritage (built)
- Designated: 28 July 2000
- Reference no.: 601692
- Significant period: 1916–1917 (fabric); 1916–1921, 1942–1945, 1949–1964 (historical)
- Significant components: store/s / storeroom / storehouse, assay office

Assay Office is a heritage-listed mining laboratory at 167 Walsh Street, Mareeba, Shire of Mareeba, Queensland, Australia. It was built from 1916 to 1917. It is also known as Forestry Office. It was added to the Queensland Heritage Register on 28 July 2000.

== History ==
The Government Assay Office was built in 1916, it is situated behind the Court House on the corner of Hort and Constance Streets, Mareeba. It was designed by the Queensland Government Architect and built by E G Greening of Atherton, at the cost of £400. The adjacent storeroom and office, constructed in the same style, was built the following year.

At the end of the 1890s, the important minerals around the Mareeba area were wolfram and molybdenite, used for hardening and strengthening steel. These were mined mainly at Wolfram Camp, Mount Carbine, Mount Perseverance and Bamford. In May 1915 Queensland's first secure Labor government was elected into power. Under the leadership of T. J. Ryan, and with many members drawn from Queensland's northern mining fields and a policy of State capitalism, the Queensland Government set about implementing a policy of acquiring State enterprises to compete on the free market. There was a pre-World War I boom in wolfram in both Australia and Europe, to supply armament industries. However, a wartime ruling banning the sale of ore to foreign buyers prompted the Queensland Government to assist the local mines by building a state battery at Bamford and an assay office in Mareeba.

Mareeba, because of its proximity to the Tablelands railway and the surrounding mineral areas, was chosen as the site for the assay office. The town of Mareeba was originally surveyed in 1893 following the arrival of the railway from the coastal port of Cairns. The line was later extended to service the Herberton tin fields. In 1901, the Chillagoe railway line from Mareeba to Mungana was opened to service the Chillagoe mining fields, further securing the future of the township. By 1916 the population of the Mareeba district was estimated to be over 1,200.

The assay office, a single, two-roomed brick-and-timber construction, was built in 1916 by local Atherton builder, E G Greening. The design of the Mareeba Assay Office was modified from other similar buildings, which had been found to have certain design faults. In particular, the original plans called for the walls and ceiling of the office to be constructed of pine timber, which could have been easily ignited by the heat of the muffle furnace used in the assaying process. Therefore, the plans for the Mareeba Assay Office allowed for the whole of the west wall to be constructed of brick. Other local adaptations included the inclusion of a door adjacent to the Balance Table to allow fumes to dissipate.

In November 1916 the State Mining Engineer recommended that another building be provided on the site for use as a storeroom and office. He further recommended that this building be of the same dimensions as the existing assay office building, but of cheaper construction. Therefore, the walls of the building were constructed entirely of chamferboard, on a concrete slab, with a fibro cement roof. He requested that the construction of the office and storeroom be dealt with "as an urgent matter" because he wanted the building completed before the Assayer was appointed. The second building was constructed in 1917, adjacent to the original assay office.

The Government Assayer appointed was Mr Cosmo Murray. It is said 14-year-old Bill McGore was his apprentice for possibly the last 18 months of the building's use as an assay office. Late in 1917, at the request of the Government Assayer, the complex was fenced at a cost of £22, to keep children from the nearby school away from the area containing poisons, as well as to deter cattle which strayed nearby at night. Also in 1917, the Government Assayer requested incandescent lights be installed in both the assay office and the storeroom, since he often worked at night. These were approved of at the cost of £6.

In 1917 a report showed that the assay office was proving very convenient to miners from surrounding districts, because samples could be treated there at the same time as they were sent to buyers and this ensured better conditions regarding sales of ore. However, the metals boom came to an abrupt halt following the end of the war in November 1918. By 1921, the Mareeba Assay Office was closed.

With the construction of Mareeba Airfield in 1942 and the influx of troops to the area during World War II, the assay office was used as an American Army PX store. In 1943 it became the district headquarters for the Australian Women's Army. A.W.A.S. personnel were barracked in eight-bedded huts in Arnold Park alongside the assay office, using the building itself as their orderly room. At this time, Mareeba railway station was the Tablelands' main depot for materials needed in the construction of roads, army camps, warehouses, hospitals and other defence facilities. These movements, plus the 3,579 U.S. and Australian troops brought to the area, once again changed the face of Mareeba township. It became one of the "feeding points" for troops travelling by train to the Atherton Tableland, with local women providing the food from their own rationed supplies.

In 1949, the assay office was taken over by the Queensland Forestry Department, who used it as an office until 26 July 1964. The Mareeba Magistrate's Court then used the former storeroom and office as a storage area until 1978, at which time the Public Works Department began using it for storage.

== Description ==
The assay office and store are situated in the grounds of the Mareeba Court House and are located at the corner of Hort and Constance Street, Mareeba. The complex comprises two buildings: the Assay Office (Laboratory) and the Store Room and Office.

The assay office is a tall, single-storey building approximately 6.5 metres (21 ft) long and 4 metres (13 ft) wide, with a verandah approximately 2.5 metres (8 ft 2 in) wide facing the store room and office. The assay office was built on a concrete slab foundation. The exterior walls are mostly weatherboard; however, approximately 4.5 metres (15 ft) of the wall facing Hort Street is constructed of brick (English bond)—this wall contains a brick chimney. Adjacent to the chimney is the small building constructed in 1917, which was used to house the air gas plant. It has corrugated iron walls nailed to a timber frame. It was constructed on a concrete base.

The hipped roof is constructed of asbestos tiles, and extends over the verandah on the eastern side. A small porch covers the entry to the building, which faces Constance Street. The interior of the building consists of one room. The internal linings are tongue and groove. The building has three exits including the front door, another on the east side of the building and, opposite this on the west side of the building, is a third door that opens out onto the verandah. There are three windows, all are double-hung sash windows with plain timber surrounds. Fanlights have been incorporated into the front door and the door on the western side of the building. A panel of wire mesh is fixed to the inside of all glass windows for security purposes.

A large block of concrete located on the eastern wall marks the location of the muffle furnace. Next to this is a damaged section of brick wall where some of the bricks have been removed from the wall and are now lying in a heap on the floor. This is the remains of the wind furnace.

The verandah has a concrete floor and is enclosed with wire mesh and has a wire-mesh door on the Constance Street side.

The store room and office is a single-storey building which has the same floor dimensions as the assay office, and includes a verandah on the eastern side (facing the assay office). The store room and verandah were built on a concrete slab foundation. The exterior walls on the north, south and west sides are weatherboard. The eastern side is an exposed stud frame wall with a single skin on the inside of the frame. It has a hipped colour-bond roof. The store room has two exits, both doors being located on the eastern side of the building. There are four double-hung sash windows, one in each of the two side walls and two along the western wall. The interior of the building is one large room, which has a tongue-and-groove lining.

The block is sparsely vegetated and is surrounded by a wire-mesh fence. The two buildings are set close to the road and overlook the St Thomas School and the St Thomas of Villanova Catholic Church.

== Heritage listing ==
Assay Office & Store, Mareeba was listed on the Queensland Heritage Register on 28 July 2000 having satisfied the following criteria.

The place is important in demonstrating the evolution or pattern of Queensland's history.

The assay office and store is important in demonstrating the evolution of 20th-century mining technology in Queensland, in particular the role of the Queensland Government in providing assay services to miners of rare metals, in this case Wolfram, during the metals boom sparked by World War I.

The place is important in demonstrating the principal characteristics of a particular class of cultural places.

The complex is important in demonstrating the principal characteristics of small assay offices. The Mareeba Assay Office has altered little since it was constructed in 1916. Its layout and fabric were modified to rectify design faults with similar buildings constructed in Charters Towers and Cloncurry.
