= Mareeba =

- Town
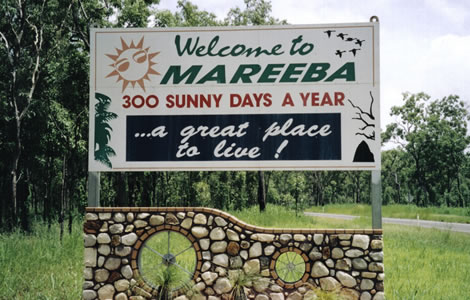

- Interactive map of Mareeba
- Coordinates: 16.9969°S 145.4230°E
- Country: Australia
- State: Queensland
- LGA: Shire of Mareeba
- Location: 62.6 km (38.9 mi) W of Cairns; 385 km (239 mi) NNW of Townsville; 1,744 km (1,084 mi) NNW of Brisbane
- Established: 1877

Government
  - State electorate: Cook
  - Federal division: Kennedy

Area
  - Total: 480.3 km^{2} (185.4 sq mi)

Population
  - Total: 11,825 (2021 census)
  - Density: 24.620/km^{2} (63.766/sq mi)
- Time zone: UTC+10:00 (AEST)
- Postcode: 4880
- Mean max temp: 29.0 °C (84.2 °F)
- Mean min temp: 16.6 °C (61.9 °F)
- Annual rainfall: 915.3 mm (36.04 in)
Localities around Mareeba
Paddys Green	Biboohra	Koah
Chewko	Mareeba	Lamb Range
Walkamin	Tolga	Danbulla; Tinaroo

Mareeba /məˈriːbə/ is a rural town and locality in the Shire of Mareeba in Far North Queensland, Australia. Between 2008 and 2013, it was within the Tablelands Region. The town's name is derived from an Aboriginal word meaning meeting of the waters. In the 2021 census, the shire of Mareeba had a population of 22,858 people.

== Geography ==
The town is 417 metres (1,368 ft) above sea level on the confluence of the Barron River, Granite Creek and Emerald Creek.

The town's main street is the Mulligan Highway which branches off from the Kennedy Highway when coming in from Cairns (63.3 km; 40 miles) away passing localities such as Speewah, Kuranda and Barron Gorge.

The Tablelands railway line enters the locality from the north (Biboohra), passes through the town, and exits to the west (Chewko). The locality is served by the following railway stations (from north to south):

- Floreat railway station, now abandoned (16.9799°S 145.4166°E)
- Mareeba railway station (16.9928°S 145.4212°E)
- Turkinje railway station, now abandoned (17.0852°S 145.4364°E)

The Lotus Glen Correctional Centre is located in Arriga, 14 km; 9 miles outside Mareeba.

== History ==
Prior to European settlement, the area around Mareeba was inhabited by the Muluridji people, who spoke a Guugu Yalandji dialect. They maintained a hunter/gatherer existence in the area between Mount Carbine, Mareeba, Rumula (near Julatten) and Woodville (near Canoona), mainly concentrated between Biboohra and Mount Molloy. In the local Aboriginal language, Mareeba means meeting of the waters - referring to the point at which the Barron River is joined by Granite Creek.

On 26 May 1875, James Venture Mulligan became the first European officially to see the future site of Mareeba when he rode up the eastern bank of the Barron River, and passed the junctions of Emerald Creek and Granite Creek.

The Mareeba area was first settled by Europeans in 1877 by John Atherton, who arrived with cattle at Emerald End, which is just north of the town today. Mareeba quickly became a busy coach stop for Cobb & Co on the road from Port Douglas to Herberton. When the railway arrived in 1893, Mareeba grew into a busy town.

Mareeba Post Office opened on 25 August 1893 (a receiving office named Granite Creek had been open from 1891). A Mareeba Diggings Post Office opened by 1893 and closed in 1905.

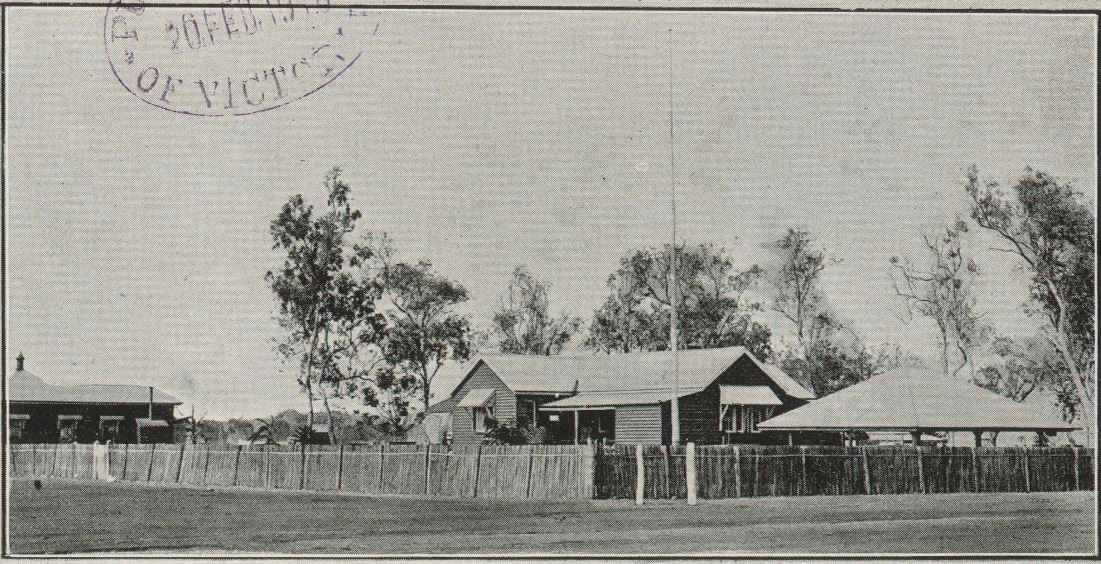
Mareeba State School, 1916

Mareeba Provisional School opened on 28 August 1893 with 46 students under head teacher Denis Horan; by December that year, there were 96 students. It became Mareeba State School on 1 January 1899. In 1940, it was designated a Rural School, meaning that it taught more practical skills needed by farming families, such as agriculture for boys and needlework for girls.

St Thomas of Villanova Catholic School opened on 1 January 1909. St Thomas' celebrated their centenary in 2009. The Mareeba parish of the Roman Catholic Vicariate Apostolic of Cooktown (now the Roman Catholic Diocese of Cairns) was established in 1911.

Ambulance services commenced in Mareeba in 1922 with an honorary ambulance officer issued with a first-aid kit. In 1942, Mareeba acquired a rail ambulance to transport patients by train. It was one of the last rail ambulances in Queensland with its last patient transported in 1983.

From 1942 to 1945 during World War II, up to 10,000 Australian and US service personnel used Mareeba Airfield as a staging post for battles in New Guinea and the South West Pacific theatre. The Americans referred to it as Hoevet Field in honour of Major Dean Carol "Pinky" Hoevet who was killed on 16 August 1942. Units that were based at Mareeba included No. 5 Squadron of the Royal Australian Air Force (RAAF), No. 100 Squadron RAAF, the Australian 33rd Light Anti-Aircraft Battery, the 19th Bomb Group of the United States Army Air Forces ( USAAF), the 43rd Bomb Group USAAF and the 8th Fighter Group USAAF. For a period of two years during World War II, Mareeba State School was taken over by the army, so St Thomas’ Catholic School accommodated the entire school population of Mareeba.

In 1949, Mareeba State School expanded to offer secondary schooling with an initial enrolment of 17 students. In 25 January 1960, Mareeba State High School opened as a dedicated secondary school and Mareeba State School resumed its role as a primary school.

Mareeba Library opened in 1958. It underwent a major refurbishment in 1985.

Mareeba is also home to an Albanian Australian community that dates from the interwar period. Built by local Albanian Australians, the Mareeba Mosque was opened on Anzac Day, 1970 and is dedicated to Australian soldiers who lost their lives in war.

On 24 January 2006, St Stephen's Catholic College opened after a nearly 10-year approval process regarding the provision of Catholic secondary education.

In October 2011, most of the land (209 hectares; 516 acres) of the former state farm / research station at Kairi was sold by the Queensland Government, retaining only 26 hectares (65 acres). The sale of the land was to fund the establishment of the Agri-Science Hub at Peters Street in Mareeba. The hub focusses on agricultural research and development, together with education and training. James Cook University is a partner of the hub, researching tropical agriculture, aquaculture and biosecurity. The hub opened on 16 December 2011.

In the 2023 Australian Indigenous Voice referendum, 85% of Mareeba's residents voted No which was one of the largest proportion of No votes in the country.

== Demographics ==
In the 2006 census, the town of Mareeba had a population of 6,806 people.

In the 2011 census, the locality of Mareeba had a population of 10,181 people.

In the 2016 census, the locality of Mareeba had a population of 11,079 people. Mareeba included the largest Italian Australian community of any suburb in Queensland, with 1,608 people making up 10.8% of the population.

In the 2021 census, the locality of Mareeba had a population of 22,858 people.

== Heritage listings ==
Mareeba has a number of heritage-listed sites, including:

- Mareeba Shire Hall, 136 Walsh Street
- Assay Office, 167 Walsh Street
- Mareeba Uniting Church, 189 Walsh Street (cnr Rankin Street) (16.9974°S 145.4246°E)

== Climate ==
Mareeba has a tropical savanna climate (Köppen: Aw), with a short, hot wet season from December to March and a lengthy, warm dry season from April to November. Due to its elevation, average minima are lowered: ranging from 14.0 °C (57.2 °F) in August to 21.5 °C (70.7 °F) in January to February. In addition, due to being in a rain shadow, average annual rainfall is only 875.9 mm (34.48 in). Despite Mareeba township's tagline reading "300 sunny days a year", and its reputation as a sunny place, Mareeba only receives 86.2 clear days annually. Extreme temperatures have ranged from 40.7 °C (105.3 °F) on 5 January 1994 to 0.4 °C (32.7 °F) on 28 June 1963.

Temperature, rainfall and 3 pm conditions were taken from the new Mareeba Airport weather station, which opened in 2000. Meanwhile, extreme temperature data was combined from Mareeba's QWRC, old Airport and new Airport weather stations. In addition, sun data was taken from Walkamin Research Station, 7.1 km south of the town.

Climate data for Mareeba (17º04'12"S, 145º25'48"E, 472 m AMSL) (2000–2024 normals, 1957–2024 extremes, sun 1968–2012)
Month	Jan	Feb	Mar	Apr	May	Jun	Jul	Aug	Sep	Oct	Nov	Dec	Year
Record high °C (°F)	40.7 (105.3)	37.8 (100.0)	36.0 (96.8)	34.0 (93.2)	34.1 (93.4)	33.0 (91.4)	34.9 (94.8)	34.0 (93.2)	39.2 (102.6)	40.5 (104.9)	40.6 (105.1)	39.8 (103.6)	40.7 (105.3)
Mean daily maximum °C (°F)	31.2 (88.2)	30.7 (87.3)	29.9 (85.8)	28.6 (83.5)	26.9 (80.4)	25.5 (77.9)	25.1 (77.2)	26.4 (79.5)	28.7 (83.7)	30.8 (87.4)	31.8 (89.2)	32.2 (90.0)	29.0 (84.2)
Mean daily minimum °C (°F)	21.5 (70.7)	21.5 (70.7)	20.8 (69.4)	19.2 (66.6)	17.0 (62.6)	15.4 (59.7)	14.1 (57.4)	14.0 (57.2)	15.5 (59.9)	17.5 (63.5)	19.3 (66.7)	20.8 (69.4)	18.1 (64.5)
Record low °C (°F)	11.1 (52.0)	14.6 (58.3)	13.9 (57.0)	10.4 (50.7)	1.7 (35.1)	0.4 (32.7)	0.7 (33.3)	1.7 (35.1)	5.4 (41.7)	7.0 (44.6)	7.0 (44.6)	11.0 (51.8)	0.4 (32.7)
Average precipitation mm (inches)	236.2 (9.30)	218.7 (8.61)	155.8 (6.13)	48.3 (1.90)	14.1 (0.56)	9.8 (0.39)	9.7 (0.38)	6.8 (0.27)	5.9 (0.23)	15.3 (0.60)	38.0 (1.50)	120.0 (4.72)	875.9 (34.48)
Average precipitation days (≥ 1.0 mm)	12.5	13.5	10.3	4.7	2.3	1.6	1.7	1.1	1.0	2.3	3.5	8.2	62.7
Average afternoon relative humidity (%)	62	67	60	58	55	57	51	47	44	43	47	54	54
Average dew point °C (°F)	20.2 (68.4)	21.1 (70.0)	19.1 (66.4)	17.3 (63.1)	14.9 (58.8)	14.2 (57.6)	12.0 (53.6)	12.1 (53.8)	12.9 (55.2)	14.3 (57.7)	16.3 (61.3)	18.6 (65.5)	16.1 (61.0)
Mean monthly sunshine hours	210.8	172.3	204.6	216.0	223.2	222.0	238.7	263.5	276.0	297.6	267.0	244.9	2,836.6
Percentage possible sunshine	52	48	54	62	64	67	69	73	77	77	69	60	64
Source 1: Bureau of Meteorology (2000–2024 normals, extremes 1957–2024)
Source 2: Bureau of Meteorology (1968–2012 sun, sourced from Walkamin Research Station, 7.1 km away)

== Economy ==
Numerous crops are grown throughout Mareeba Shire, including avocados, mangoes, lychees, longans, sugar cane, cashews, macadamias, bananas, pineapples, tea tree oil, coffee, cotton and a variety of vegetables and tropical fruits. Poultry and cattle are also common.

The Mareeba region produces 70% of Australia's coffee.

=== Tobacco Industry ===
Tobacco was once the main grown crop of the local economy. De-regulation of the industry in 1995 led to a decline in profitability, followed by a ban on tobacco cultivation. In 1996, the local tobacco industry was worth $40 million a year and at its peak there were over 600 tobacco farms in the Mareeba-Dimbulah area. The final legal tobacco sale in Queensland occurred in Mareeba on February 20, 2004. The Mareeba Sales Floor was located on Chewko Road / Sales Floor Street, Mareeba (-17.00805776509912, 145.41267614186415).

The Mareeba-Dimbulah district was the capital of Tobacco Cultivation. the Mareeba Tobacco Leaf Marketing Board building signage can still be seen above the current Westpac Bank on Byrnes Street, Mareeba.

The Mareeba Heritage Centre has a Tobacco Exhibition opened in 2012.

== Education ==
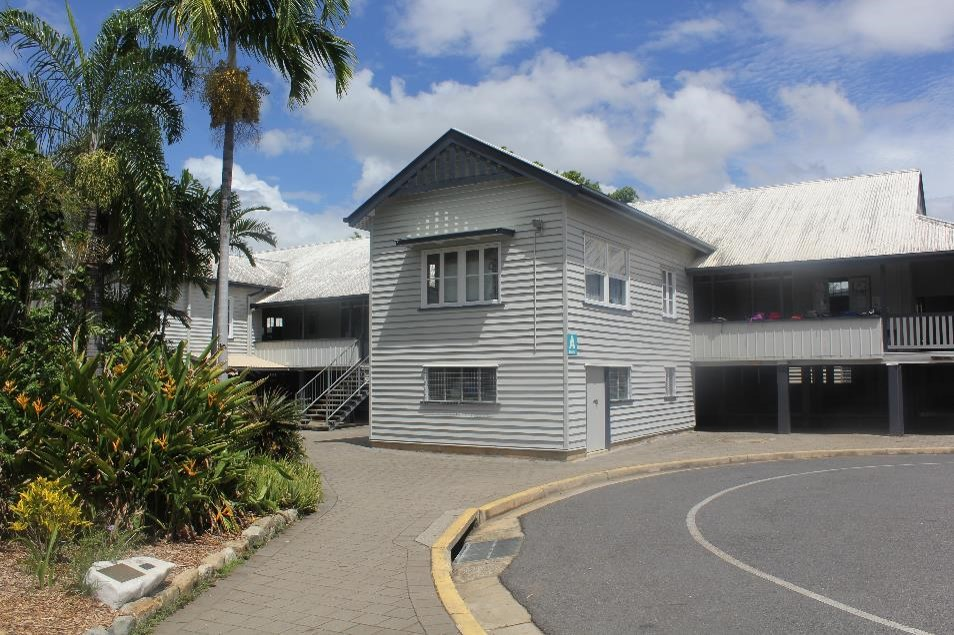
Mareeba State School, 2021

Mareeba State School is a government primary (Prep–6) school for boys and girls at Constance Street (16.9919°S 145.4249°E). In 2018, the school had an enrolment of 866 students with 69 teachers (64 full-time equivalent) and 48 non-teaching staff (33 full-time equivalent). In includes a special education program.

St Thomas' School is a Catholic primary (Prep–6) school for boys and girls at 63 Constance Street (16.9952°S 145.4254°E). In 2018, the school had an enrolment of 426 students with 33 teachers (26 full-time equivalent) and 27 non-teaching staff (15 full-time equivalent).

Mareeba State High School is a government secondary (7–12) school for boys and girls in Jasper Street (16.9958°S 145.4163°E). In 2018, the school had an enrolment of 732 students with 70 teachers (66 full-time equivalent) and 45 non-teaching staff (33 full-time equivalent). It includes a special education program.

St Stephen's Catholic College is a Catholic secondary (7–12) school for boys and girls at 3 McIver Road (17.0176°S 145.4198°E). In 2018, the school had an enrolment of 555 students with 57 teachers (48 full-time equivalent) and 32 non-teaching staff (22 full-time equivalent).

== Health ==
Mareeba Hospital is in the Tablelands Health District. It provides 52 beds, with surgical, maternity, pediatric, outpatient, emergency and x-ray facilities.

== Sports ==
Mareeba Gladiators are the local rugby league team. The Gladiators participate in the Cairns District Rugby League competition. They last won the Premiership in 2007.

The Mareeba Saints participated in the AFL Cairns reserves competition from 1983 to 1986, winning the competition twice. the Saints played out of Mareeba State High School. The club was disbanded due to lack of player numbers.

== Amenities ==
Mareeba Shire Council operates a public library at 221 Byrnes Street. The library facility opened in 1958, with a major refurbishment in 1985 and minor refurbishment in 2013.

The Mareeba branch of the Queensland Country Women's Association meets at the CWA Hall on the corner of Dempster Street and Wilkes Street. The Cairns Aerial Outpost branch of the Queensland Country Women's Association meets at 15 Wilson Street.

St Thomas of Villanova's Catholic Church is at 59 Constance Street. St Stephen's College at Lot 3 McIver Road also has a Catholic church. Both are within the Mareeba Parish of the Roman Catholic Diocese of Cairns.

The Mareeba Mosque is at 108 Walsh Street.

== Media ==
Mareeba is serviced by the following radio stations:

- 4AM 558
- ABC Far North 720
- ABC Radio National 105.1
- ABC News Radio 101.1
- ABC Classic 105.9
- Triple J 107.5
- Hit FM 103.5
- KIK FM 88.7
- Black Star Radio FM 96.7
- Rhema FM 92.3
- Triple M 99.5

== Attractions ==
Tourist attractions in the Mareeba Shire include the Golden Drop Mango Winery, Jaques Coffee Plantation, Coffee Works, Mareeba Heritage Museum, Mareeba Rock Wallabies and Granite Gorge Nature Park, Emerald Creek Falls, and Davies Creek Falls.

== Events ==
The Mareeba Rodeo and Festival is held annually, with the first Affiliated Mareeba Rodeo held in July 1949 (which is now the home ground of the Gladiators Rugby league team). The rodeo is hosted at the Kerribee Park Rodeo Grounds, located slightly out of town on route to Dimbulah. In 2014, the attendance was 13,000, almost double the town's normal population. A parade through the town is held, and the Rodeo Queen is crowned (the first Princess was crowned in 1959). A ute muster is often staged over the same weekend as the rodeo. In 1999 Mareeba District Rodeo Association Inc. celebrated their 50 years Golden Jubilee of the foundation of the Association and 20 years of the opening of "Kerribee Park".

The FNQ Country Music Festival and Talent Search is held annually at Kerribee Park Rodeo Grounds. The event is hosted by the Walkamin Country Music Club.

Each year on the third Sunday of January, St Thomas's Catholic Church celebrates the Feast of Santo Nino which celebrates Jesus as a child. The event is of special significance to the Filipino Australians. After the Mass, there is a celebratory meal of Filipino cuisine.

Each year, on the second Sunday of September, St Thomas's Catholic Church celebrates the Feast of Our Lady of the Chain. The celebration begins with a procession through various streets of Mareeba and culminates in a fireworks display.

== Photo gallery ==
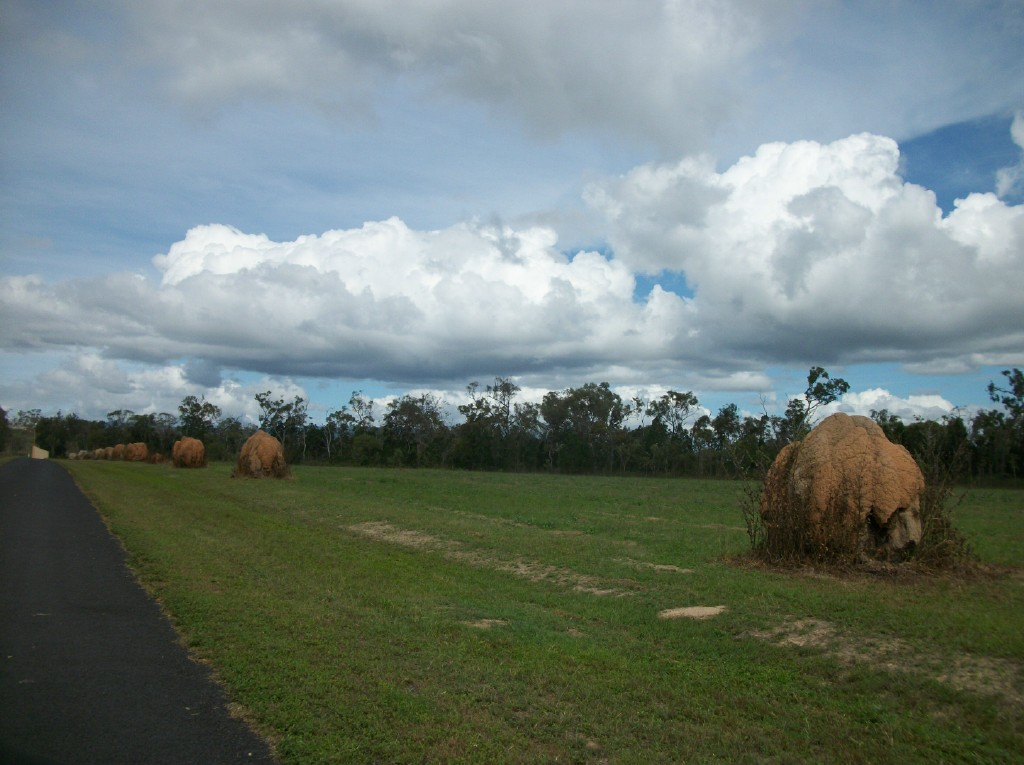
Moved termite mounds, Mareeba

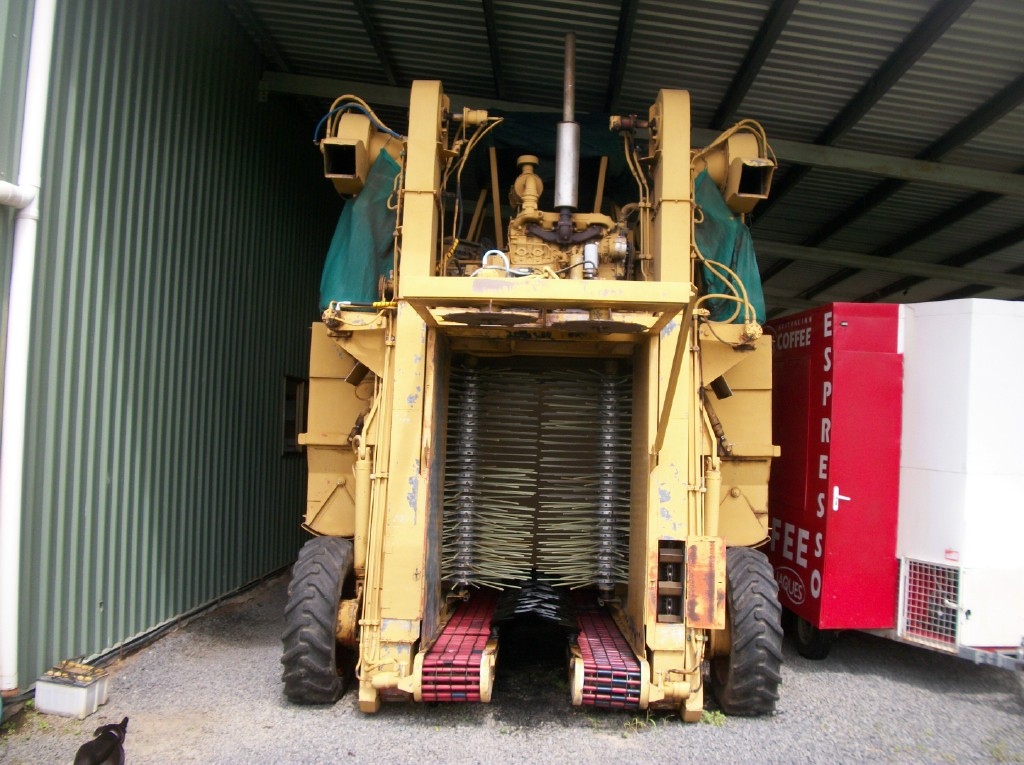
Coffee bean harvester, Mareeba

== Notable residents ==
- Aron Baynes (born 1986), Australian basketball player 2014 NBA champion
- Harriett Brims (1864–1939), pioneer female commercial photographer
- Mitchell Burns, photographer and influencer
- Steven Ciobo (born 1974), Australian politician
- Tom Gilmore, Jr. (1946-2024), Australian politician
- Katie Page (born 1956), CEO of Harvey Norman
- Ernest Riordan (1901–1954), Australian politician
- Chris Sheppard (born 1981), Australian rugby league player
- Wayne Srhoj (born 1982), Australian footballer
- Deon St. Mor, Australian business owner and designer
- Owsley Stanley, (1935–2011), American counter-culture figure of the 1960s (LSD; The Grateful Dead)

== See also ==
- Mareeba rock-wallaby (Petrogale mareeba) – named after Mareeba
