= Mareeba State High School =

Location
- Mareeba, Queensland; Australia; 16°59′44″S 145°25′00″E

Information
- Type: Public
- Motto: Non Nobis Solum (Not for ourselves alone)
- Established: 1960
- Principal: Scott Whybird
- Enrolment: 790 (2023)
- Campus: Rural
- Website: https://mareebashs.eq.edu.au

Mareeba State High School is a public, co-educational, high school, located in the town of Mareeba, in Queensland, Australia. It is administered by the Department of Education, with an enrolment of 790 students and a teaching staff of 64, as of 2023. The school serves students from Year 7 to Year 12, and was the first state school in Queensland to offer the Moderna COVID-19 vaccine.

== History ==
The school opened 25 January 1960.

To improve Indigenous road safety, in 2005, the school created a Driver Awareness Program Workbook, which aimed "to prepare students to successfully sit for their learners' theory test." It was specifically designed for students with literacy difficulties.

In March 2018, some students and staff were sent home as a precaution due to rising flood waters, however the school remained open.

In 2021, the school was the first state school in Queensland to offer the Moderna COVID-19 vaccine.

== Sport Houses ==
The school consists of four sport houses, McKinlay, Kennedy, Leichart and Gregory.

== Notable alumni ==
- Ben Hampton, Australian professional rugby league footballer
- Aron Baynes, Australian professional basketball player
