= Kingsborough Battery =

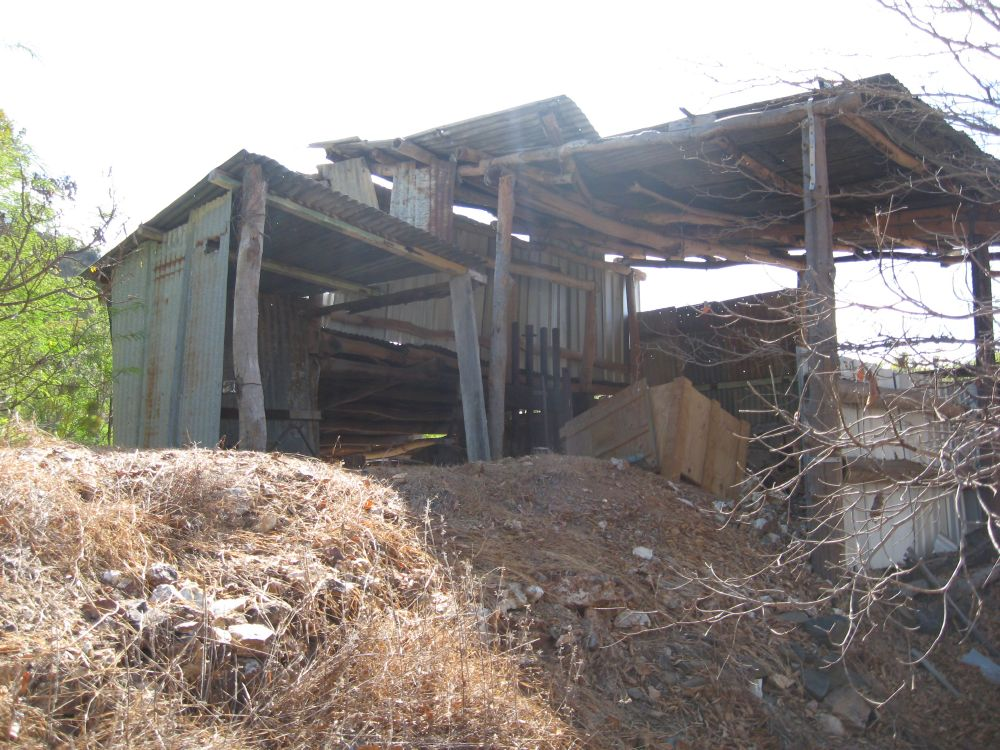
- Kingsborough Battery, 2009

- Location within Queensland Location within Australia
- 16.9275°S 145.0383°E
- Location: Off the former East Street (now Kingsborough–Thornborough Road), Kingsborough, Thornborough, Shire of Mareeba, Queensland, Australia

History
- Design period: 1870s–1890s (late 19th century)
- Built: c. 1896–1990s

Queensland Heritage Register
- Official name: Kingsborough Battery
- Type: state heritage (built)
- Designated: 21 October 1992
- Reference no.: 600682
- Significant period: 1870s–1990s (fabric); 1896–c. 1908 (historical)
- Significant components: chimney/chimney stack, tank – storage, battery shed, machinery/plant/equipment – mining/mineral processing, battery/crusher/stamper/jaw breaker

Kingsborough Battery is a heritage-listed mining building off the former East Street (now Thornborough-Kingsborough Road), Kingsborough, Thornborough, Shire of Mareeba, Queensland, Australia. It was built from c. 1896 to 1990s. It was added to the Queensland Heritage Register on 21 October 1992.

== History ==
The Kingsborough Battery is located around 30 kilometres (19 mi) west of the town of Dimbulah within the former Kingsborough township in an area once known as the Hodgkinson goldfield. It was reconstructed from salvaged parts in the 1990s for processing minerals, although reprocessing at the site did not eventuate. The plant is composed of a five-head stamper, concrete foundations, boiler, earth ramp, corrugated iron shed and brick chimney.

The Hodgkinson Goldfield was proclaimed on 15 June 1876, after the first discoveries of gold on the Hodgkinson River by James Venture Mulligan in February that year. Although the Hodgkinson was geologically similar to the great alluvial gold field to the north, the Palmer, it was predominantly a reefing field and did not prove to have the same attraction for small miners due to a lack of alluvial finds. The major mines were in the vicinity of the now abandoned townships of Kingsborough, Thornborough and Northcote. It was a neglected field through lack of capital, and although there was an optimistic outlook until the first decade of the twentieth century, it was clear by 1908 that its small yield no longer justified separate goldfield administration and accordingly, in 1909 it was incorporated into the Chillagoe Gold and Mineral field.

When Queensland Government administration first arrived on the Hodgkinson on 19 April 1876 over 2,000 men were working on the field, mainly alluvial miners from the Palmer goldfield. Many of the men were disappointed in the lack of alluvial gold on the Hodgkinson and soon returned to towns such as Byerstown on the Palmer goldfield. As a result of the government administration visit, miners on the Palmer were warned through posters on the Hodgkinson track that the new find was a total failure and not to travel to the newly established goldfield.

However the Hodgkinson proved to be a valuable reefing field, and it was estimated that over 100,000 ounces (2,800,000 g) of gold was produced from gravel and reef from the Hodgkinson up to 1877, over 44,000 ounces (1,200,000 g) in 1878 and declining until 1891, when only 655 ounces (18,600 g) were produced. There was subsequent rising production to 4,853 ounces (137,600 g) in 1901. Crushing equipment was brought to the field from the Palmer and Etheridge and established at Tyrconnel Creek, Watsonville (also known as Woodsville), Beaconsfield, Kingston (later Kingsborough) and Thornborough. In total, 8 machines were operating on the Hodgkinson and within a year of its discovery settlements were located close to the major reefs, with Kingston and Thornborough the major settlements on the field.

By mid 1877 Kingston (later Kingsborough) had a population of 1,100, with 8 general stores, 2 butchers, and 12 public houses. There was a lemonade factory, chemist, baker, auctioneer, assayer, blacksmith, newsagents, and brickworks as well as the Vulcan crushing battery. A small dam was built across the Caledonia Creek to ensure water supplies for the steam-powered crushing machinery. The town was surveyed on 1 May 1880. By 1886 the population of Kingsborough had declined to 50 (by 1901 the Mining Warden estimated the entire population of the Hodgkinson Goldfield to be 960). The Vulcan battery was purchased by the Tyrconnel Gold Mining Company in 1884 and relocated to Sam the Roman's camp in 1895.

In 1896 new finds in the Kingsborough district led to the erection of the Reconstruction battery (also known as Rowan battery, named after the family that re-erected the crusher) and a cyanide plant. Reconstruction battery had formerly been known as the Good Hope battery prior to its relocation from Limestone. The major focus of the renewed interest in the Hodgkinson was General Grant Mine, a surface plant with a deep shaft that was sunk to 735 feet (224 m) over the next few years.

In August 1901 the Reconstruction battery had to suspend operations for 4 months due to the lack of water caused by the drought and because of a leak in an old boiler which had to be replaced. The principal mines in the area, including the General Grant, had to lay off men and undertake development work rather than supplying ore for crushing.

By 1904, over half the population of the Hodgkinson were working in the wolfram industry at Wolfram Camp. Irvinebank Mining Company bought into most of the wolfram mines in 1907 and subsequently developed the Mount Mulligan coal mine. In 1914 the Irvinebank Mining Company constructed a rail line from Mount Mulligan to connect to the Cairns-Dimbulah railway.

It is presumed that the Reconstruction battery had ceased operating by about 1908 when goldmining of the Hodgkinson had faded. Photographic evidence published in Kirkman essay "Mining on the Hodgkinson" in Readings in North Queensland Mining History (Vol 2 pp187) shows the Reconstruction battery had totally collapsed by 1979, only the brick chimney was still standing. Local knowledge indicates that any useful material such as corrugated iron was moved to Thornborough in the late 1970s and the site was totally abandoned in 1980.

The current caretaker of the site describes reconstructing the battery for use as a crusher in the early 1990s after an episode of vandalism left it in pieces. Reconstruction involved building an earth ramp and timber retaining wall, welding together pieces of the 5 head stamper battery that were found laying in pieces, bringing a jaw crusher from Mount Garnet and re-erecting the steam boiler. A corrugated iron shed was constructed over the battery. Crushing at the newly erected battery did not eventuate and the caretaker of the property currently uses the site as a storage area for machinery and other spare parts.

== Description ==
Kingsborough township is located about 30 kilometres (19 mi) north of Dimbulah township with access through Thornborough township off the Dimbulah - Mount Mulligan road. The place is now abandoned save for one resident who lives in a concrete cavity brick house near the battery. The battery is located within the garden of a fenced allotment near the house on Caledonia Creek.

The place consists of a 5 head stamp battery, boiler, engine, jaw crusher, brick double chimney, corrugated iron tanks and earth ramp, some of which are covered by a corrugated iron roof with timber uprights. The stamper sits on a timber and earth wall and is marked "Langland's Foundry Co. Ltd Melbourne 1882". A belt connects the stamper to the flywheel which is attached to an engine sitting on concrete blocks beneath under the shed roof. The boiler sits off the ground on concrete stands immediately on the south-east of the shed and is marked "Gold Medal Paris 1876". The shed has been constructed from salvaged pieces of corrugated iron and bush timbers and is partially enclosed. There is evidence of termite activity inside the shed and the floor of the shed is concrete.

An earth ramp with a low incline leading to the stamper is on the north-east side of the shed. A jaw crusher sits at the head of the ramp adjacent to the stamper. The timber hopper has completely collapsed.

There is a double brick chimney on the western side of the battery shed that is no longer part of the operation of the battery. Four corrugated iron tanks sit about 5 metres (16 ft) to the north-east of the battery shed.

The surrounding landscape is dry sclerophyll, with some vegetable and flower gardens associated with the nearby masonry house located close to the battery. Neither the plantings nor the masonry house form part of the heritage significance of the place.

== Heritage listing ==
Kingsborough Battery was listed on the Queensland Heritage Register on 21 October 1992 having satisfied the following criteria.

The place is important in demonstrating the evolution or pattern of Queensland's history.

The place is important in demonstrating the evolution or pattern of Queensland's history, particularly the development and decline of north Queensland mining and the re-use of available equipment for subsequent mining operations in remote areas.

The place is important in demonstrating the principal characteristics of a particular class of cultural places.

It contains the principal characteristics of reef gold processing sites, being a 5 head stamper battery, and corrugated iron shed, with a double brick chimney nearby.
