= Tyrconnel Mine and Battery =

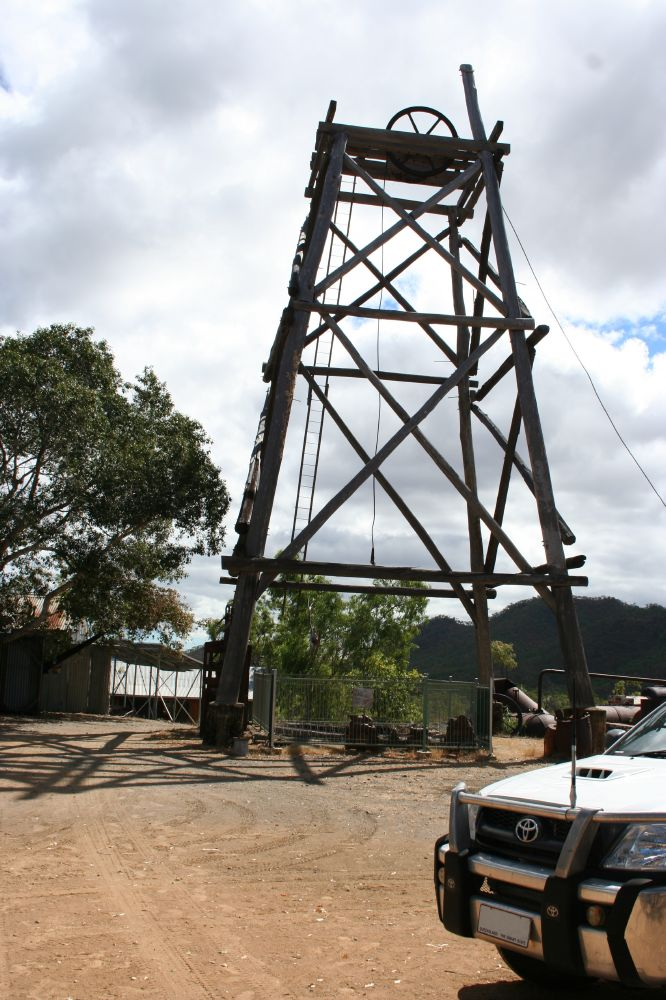
- Tyrconnel Mine and Battery, 2010

- Location within Queensland Location within Australia
- 16.9347°S 145.0351°E
- Location: between Kingsborough and Thornborough, Shire of Mareeba, Queensland, Australia

History
- Design period: 1870s–1890s (late 19th century)
- Built: 1876–1980s

Queensland Heritage Register
- Official name: Tyrconnel Mine and Battery
- Type: state heritage (built, archaeological)
- Designated: 21 October 1992
- Reference no.: 600687
- Significant period: 1876–1980s (fabric); 1876–1899, 1912–1924, 1930s–1940s, 1960s, 1980s (historical)
- Significant components: machinery/plant/equipment – mining/mineral processing, tailings dump, residential accommodation – manager's house/quarters, dam/reservoir, shaft, battery shed, cyanide plant/cyanide vat, battery/crusher/stamper/jaw breaker

Tyrconnel Mine and Battery is a heritage-listed gold mine between Kingsborough and Thornborough, Shire of Mareeba, Queensland, Australia. It was built from 1876 to 1980s. It was added to the Queensland Heritage Register on 21 October 1992.

== History ==
The Tyrconnel Mine has been one of the richest producers on the Hodgkinson Goldfield. Discovered in 1876, it was originally taken up by Redmond and McVeigh on 20 April 1876. The mine's name comes from Tír Chonaill, often anglicised as Tyrconnell, an old Gaelic túath (or principality) in the west of Ulster in the north of Ireland. Modern-day County Donegal is largely coextensive with the former principality of Tír Chonaill.

The first battery erected at the mine was Warde and Company's in November 1876, evidently financed by A. Forsythe in Brisbane, from whom this expensive ten head stamp battery took its name. This battery began crushing in February 1877 and the local proprietors, John Warde and Thomas E. White, renamed it the Brisbane in March 1877. In early 1879 they obtained a berdan pan for it, obtaining one from the Spring Gully mill which had been idle since June 1878.

The Tyrconnel shaft was down to 128 metes in 1888 when it closed in the hands of the bank. The mine had not been worked for several years although its total production to date was 11,000 tons of stone for a yield of 18,000 ounces of gold. The mine had a 12h.p. engine and winding and pumping gear but was full of water.

The mine was advertised for sale by public auction at Herberton in May 1897. It was sold to a Sydney syndicate who floated it and the Sweet William mine at Mount Molloy on the English market £4,000 cash and 1,000 shares in 1898. It was then the deepest mine on the field. The float came to nothing. Because of water flooding, the lease holder, William Keating Snr, worked a new shaft to obtain good samples of which he sent a ton of four to six ounce stone to the 1899 Colonial Exhibition. He held the mine for several years of perseverance. He offered it to a Melbourne syndicate in 1899.

A new company was formed in 1912 and the mine reopened after many years. A Victorian mine manager, David Morgan, was appointed as the new Tyrconnel mine manager. By early 1913 they had the winding gear and ore bins erected. The owners bought the Great Dyke Company's ten head battery at Caledonia Creek near Thornborough. T. Harley, engineer-in-charge, had the contract for £80 to transport the battery to its new position. Their first twelve weeks of crushings from the mine were impressive yielding 1,041 ounces of gold from 945 tons of stone (sent out to another battery for crushing). They installed a compressor in July 1913 and rock drills in September. In October they struck a reef almost 2.4 metres (7 ft 10 in) wide which offered two to three ounce gold quartz. The mine shaft was then put in order in November for skips. By then the battery was almost ready and the headframe was being put in position. They also had a suction gas engine sitting at Dimbulah awaiting transport to the Hodgkinson. The battery started crushing in February 1914 but broke down in May because the engine bed plate broke. The company was doing very well through Morgan's careful management and William Keating's confidence. They were obtaining one ounce stone continually in 1914 and the battery kept going as long as there was water.

The battery's suction gas engine broke down in October 1915 and crushing had to be stopped. An electrical plant (210 volt generator) was installed in 1915 to provide lighting and pumping facilities and the battery had a wheeler pan. In 1916 the mine boiler was retubed and the battery gas plant was being repaired and all other machinery overhauled. Dewatering of the mine was commenced at 81 metres (266 ft). Cyaniding was also undertaken. A new boiler was obtained for the winding engine and compressor. Crushing and cyaniding was producing satisfactory results and additional steam power was obtained in 1917. The Tyrconnel Gold Mines Limited bought the Cecil Syndicate battery at the General Grant Mine and re-erected it at the Tyrconnel Mine in 1917. The tailings from the milled ore were then run directly into the cyanide plant. The working shaft on the northern end of the property was sunk further in 1918 to work on one ounce stone. A large quantity of this stone was stoped out and sent to the battery. A 10 head stamper was brought from the General Gordon mine to enlarge the battery to 20 head. A large Cornish boiler was put in position at the beginning of 1918. A compressor to drive the drills was also being considered for purchase and, if the mine proved up well, then the water supply would have to be upgraded to supply the battery.

New head gear and another high pressure Cornish boiler were added to the Tyrconnel mine plant together with an eight drill air compressor in 1919. A 7 kW dynamo was installed in 1922 to provide light for the battery and the surface of the mine. Operations were suspended in 1924.

In 1930, 120 tons of the old sands from the mine were cyanided. With the granting of a 600-acre concession there was renewed optimism on the Hodgkinson goldfield. W. Craven treated 700 tons of old sands for 216 ounces of bullion gold valued at £190.14.7 in 1934. Machinery from overseas was ordered in 1935 for the mine. Renovations to the battery were proposed so as to treat 60 tons of ore per day and also to dewater the mine. The Queensland Gold Development Syndicate Limited reconditioned the mine, erected a new headframe and a 10 head battery, classifying and flotation machinery were installed. A concrete dam at the junction of Caledonia and Tyrconnel creeks was also constructed.

The Hodgkinson Gold Development Syndicate Limited erected a new battery in 1936 and an Ingersoll Rand drill was purchased. The ten head battery comprised a jaw crusher, ball mill, 10 head stamper, classifiers, amalgamation plates, 6-cell Kraut flotation machine, and drier. This company ceased operations on 22 July 1937 for lack of capital. After 360 fine ounces of gold and 114.5 ounces of silver and 29.21 tons of concentrates were sent to Chillagoe for refining, a caretaker was put in charge of the battery.

The battery was overhauled in 1940. A 12 and 14 inches (300 and 360 mm) jaw crusher and a No.5 Wilfley table were installed. By the end of the war all the mines on the Hodgkinson Goldfield were closed. Oliver Reece, an American, owned the New Tyrconnel, General Grant and Cecil and had a caretaker, Amos Jones, in charge. No work was done on the mine in 1950.

The mine was reactivated during the late 1960s mining boom and again in the early 1980s. In 1983 the five head battery was operated by a Petter crude oil engine fuelled by bunker oil. However a fire destroyed the timberwork of the winding engine and part of the headframe in 1984. The mine dumps were cyanided again during the 1980s.

The site is currently operated as a tourist attraction, Tyrconnel Outback Experience. There are guided tours of the mine site available, with accommodation in the former mine manager's house, newer cottages, or an adjacent campground.

== Description ==
The place contains four component groups - living quarters, mine, battery, and cyanide works. The living quarters and mine are located above the battery and cyanide works. The quarters include a corrugated iron clad cottage and kitchen, and several outbuildings. One of these buildings is a workshop which houses a small retort of comparatively recent origin.

The mine shaft contains a concrete collar and is now covered with a grid. Concrete foundations of a timber headframe survive. The headframe and winding shed were recently destroyed by fire. The winding plant includes the remains of a winding engine, a two-cylinder steam engine, two Cornish boilers, a colonial boiler in brick mounts, and an air receiver.

The battery shed is of heavy bush timber uprights carrying a light sawn timber frame. The building is corrugated iron clad and roofed. The battery contains two sets of timber ore bins. The primary crusher has been removed. Timber chutes on the lower bins feed into the two mortar boxes of 2 five head stamp batteries. Two Petter crude oil engines provide the power source for the battery. One engine remains in operating condition. Most of the concentrating plant has been removed with the exception of a Wilfley table.

Below the battery shed the remnants of a tailings dump with seven cyanide tanks extends down to Tyrconnel Creek. The most recent cyanide treatment was completed in 1986. A corrugated iron clad cottage on Tyrconnel Creek alongside the cyanide plant was formerly the battery manager's house. The battery dam remains intact on Tyrconnel Creek.

Surviving plant includes:

- Colonial boiler - Walkers Limited
- 2 Cornish boilers - no brands
- Two-cylinder centre flywheel tandem steam air compressor - Thompson Engineers Castlemaine
- Two-cylinder steam winding engine with flywheel - Tooth & Co Vulcan Foundry Maryborough (Vic)
- Cornish boiler (not in situ)
- 2 Five head stamp batteries - Fraser Chalmers Erith England
- 2 Mortar boxes (not in situ) - Fraser Chalmers 108A
- 2 Two-cylinder crude oil engines with flywheels - Petter Yeovil
- Small kerosene engine with two flywheels - no brand
- Wilfley table
- Berdan pan (not in situ)
- Grinding pan (not in situ) - Kalgoorlie Foundry Engineers
- Silverthorne & Adair Boilermaker
- Egg-end air receiver
- Small retort furnace

== Heritage listing ==
Tyrconnel Mine and Battery was listed on the Queensland Heritage Register on 21 October 1992 having satisfied the following criteria.

The place is important in demonstrating the evolution or pattern of Queensland's history.

The Tyrconnel mine and battery is significant in Queensland's history as one of the most complete and impressive mine and battery sites in the State. It demonstrates technological developments from 1876 to the mid 1980s.

The place demonstrates rare, uncommon or endangered aspects of Queensland's cultural heritage.

The surviving combination of living quarters, mine, battery and cyanide works in close proximity is rare. The battery shed is one of only a handful in North Queensland that are intact and contain plant; (others include the Emuford battery, Irvinebank StateTreatment Works, Kidston and Venus batteries). The current plant includes the third stamp battery on the site. The very intact Thompson air compressor is one of only two recorded in North Queensland (the other is at the Croydon State mine) and is rare, as is the Vulcan winding engine. The intactness of the cyanide plant relates to its recent use and is not common in the Mareeba Mining District.

The place is important in demonstrating the principal characteristics of a particular class of cultural places.

Buildings and plant are relatively intact and the complete gold mining process from raising the ore to the final extraction of gold through the milling and cyanidation processes, can be traced through the physical evidence remaining on site.
