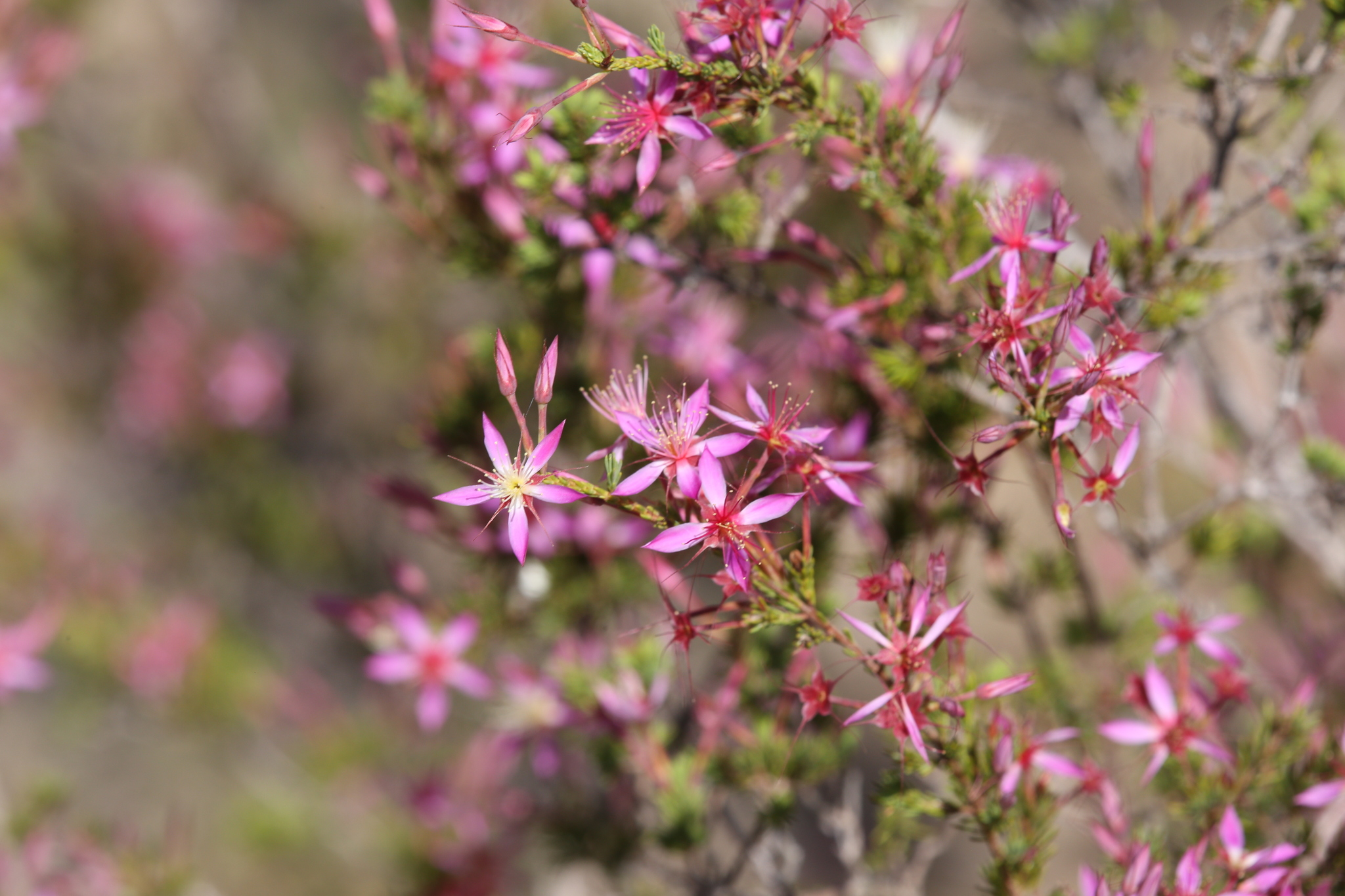
- Near Dimbulah

Conservation status
- Vulnerable (EPBC Act)

Scientific classification
- Kingdom: Plantae
- Clade: Tracheophytes
- Clade: Angiosperms
- Clade: Eudicots
- Clade: Rosids
- Order: Myrtales
- Family: Myrtaceae
- Genus: Calytrix
- Species: C. leptophylla

Binomial name
- Calytrix leptophylla Craven

= Calytrix leptophylla =

Species of flowering plant

Calytrix leptophylla is a species of flowering plant in the myrtle family Myrtaceae and is endemic to Queensland, Australia. It is a glabrous shrub with linear leaves, and pink to light purple flowers with a white base, and about 35 to 40 white to yellow stamens in several rows.

== Description ==
Calytrix leptophylla is a glabrous shrub that typically grows to a height of up to 2 m (6 ft 7 in). Its leaves are linear, 2–6 mm (0.079–0.236 in) long, 0.25–0.30 mm (0.0098–0.0118 in) wide on a petiole 0.25–0.50 mm (0.0098–0.0197 in) long. There are stipules up to 0.25 mm (0.0098 in) long at the base of the petiole. The flowers are borne on a peduncle 3.5–7.5 mm (0.14–0.30 in) long with egg-shaped, elliptic or oblong lobes 2.0–4.5 mm (0.079–0.177 in) long. The floral tube is mostly free from the style, 7–11 mm (0.28–0.43 in) long and usually has 5 ribs. The sepals are fused at the base, with more or less egg-shaped to round lobes 1.5–2.0 mm (0.059–0.079 in) long and about 1.5 mm (0.059 in) long, with an awn long up to 11 mm (0.43 in) long. The petals are pink to light purple with a white base, elliptic to narrowly elliptic, 5–9.5 mm (0.20–0.37 in) long and about 1.75–2.75 mm (0.069–0.108 in) wide, and there are about 35 to 40 white to yellow stamens in two rows. Flowering occurs from March to November.

== Taxonomy ==
Calytrix leptophylla was first formally described in 1867 by George Bentham in his Flora Australiensis from specimens collected by Ferdinand von Mueller.

== Distribution and habitat ==
This species of Calytrix grows in callitris country on stony ridges, near a creek, in heathy scrub on sandstone slopes and on granite outcrops from the Coen district to near Hughenden in north Queensland.

== Conservation status ==
Calytrix leptophylla is listed as of "least concern" under the Queensland Government Nature Conservation Act 1992.
