= Thermo Electric Ore Reduction Corporation Mill =

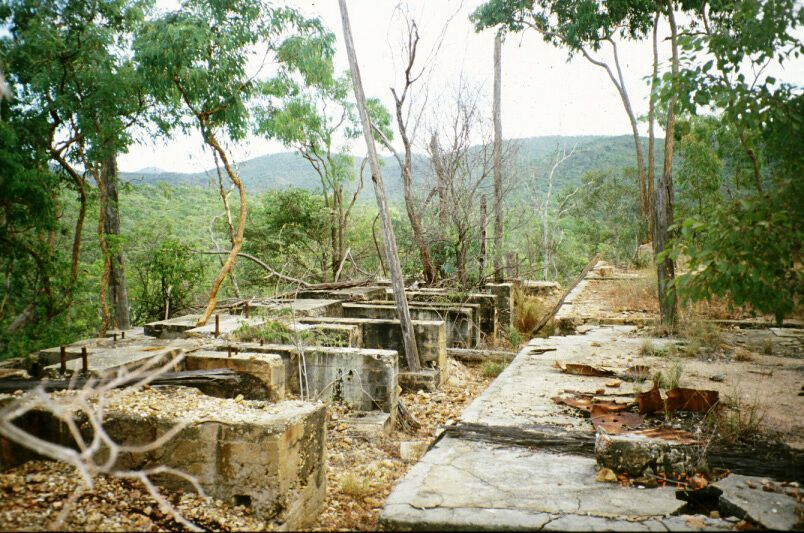
- Thermo Electric Ore Reduction Corporation Mill, 2003

- Location within Queensland Location within Australia
- 17.0905°S 144.9555°E
- Location: Wolfram Road, Wolfram, Dimbulah, Shire of Mareeba, Queensland, Australia

History
- Design period: 1900–1914 (early 20th century)
- Built: 1906–1918

Queensland Heritage Register
- Official name: Thermo Electric Ore Reduction Corporation Mill
- Type: state heritage (archaeological)
- Designated: 7 April 2004
- Reference no.: 602240
- Significant period: 1906, 1918 (fabric); 1906–1920 (historical)
- Significant components: weir, mounting block/stand, track, terracing, office/administration building, wall/s – retaining

Thermo Electric Ore Reduction Corporation Mill is a heritage-listed ruins of a mining building at Wolfram Road, Wolfram, Dimbulah, Shire of Mareeba, Queensland, Australia. It was built from 1906 to 1918. It was added to the Queensland Heritage Register on 7 April 2004.

== History ==
The Hodgkinson River area was declared a goldfield in 1876. While yields of gold were small compared to those being produced along the Palmer River, the area is also a geologically rich mineral field. The mineral known as wolfram (also known as wolframite) was discovered in 1894 in the headwaters of the Hodgkinson River scattered over the surface as bunches in quartzose boulders or in drifts interspersed with coarse gravels. In 1900, 91 pounds of molybdenite was also discovered. This was said to contain some of the finest specimens of molybdenite discovered anywhere in Australia.

Wolfram is composed of a heavy gray-white metallic element, with pure wolfram being used mainly in electrical applications and is also the ore from which tungsten is refined. In 1899 wolfram was returning £38 per ton. Other than along the Hodgkinson, wolfram has been located in north Queensland at Bamford Hill approximately 85 kilometres (53 mi) west-south-west of Cairns in 1893, north-west of Cairns at Mount Carbine in the 1890s, on Moa Island in the Torres Strait during the 1940s, and also in the Herberton district.

A small town formed near the mineral deposits, and by 1900 there were 100 men working wolfram, molybdenite and bismuth at what became known as Wolfram Camp. The Irvinebank Mining Company invested there in 1900, appointing a manager, Alexander Gillan.

Demand for high grade wolfram, after the development of tungsten as a lamp filament in 1904, and for molybdenite for use in patent alloys, led to an early interest in rare metals by British firms, the most prominent being George G. Blackwell and Sons of Liverpool. Prices in 1904 for both metals were high - up to £200 per ton for molybdenite and £140 per ton for wolfram - and attracted many goldminers. Of the 1,136 people on the Hodgkinson by 1904, 700 were miners working at Wolfram Camp. By 1909 wolfram was returning £41,820 compared to the value of gold production at £7,089. But the rare metals industry was unstable - there was insecurity in the unknown overseas markets where demand fluctuated erratically and local miners were never sure of their returns. So a Wolfram Co-operative Association was formed to arrange advances and shipments through intermediaries such as the New Zealand Loan and Mercantile Agency and W.J. Lempriere and Co, but generally the local industry was poorly organised.

From 1904, 2,500 tons of wolfram valued at £250,000 were produced at Wolfram Camp, half of which went through John Moffat's Irvinebank Company mill. John Moffat, a large speculator and enterprising investor in north Queensland mining, was diversifying his interests through steady exports of rare metals. The Irvinebank Mining Company spent upwards of £1,000 on development work on the main mines the Weate, Tully, Weate United and Comerford in 1905. The Irvinebank Company set up the battery in 1906 on Bulluburrah Creek in the lower valley using the technology for separating molybdenite which was developed by local miners. W.A. Pepper was the battery manager. The battery comprised: a rockbreaker, Cornish rolls, a Krupp table, and a Frue vanner to remove the quartz. This battery was a stabilising influence on Wolfram Camp - treating ore from the Mulligan, United, Downfall, Nichol's, Forget-me-Not, Bonner, Tully, Weate, Larkin United, Murphy's and Leinster's claims. The mill was closed for long periods throughout 1909 because of strikes over the 44-hour week. It operated again from 1910 to 1912 and was closed in the rationalisation of the Irvinebank Mining Company's assets that year.

The wolfram mining industry passed through a depression for several years from 1910 chiefly because of the exhaustion of the residual surface accumulations of ore, thus ending the days of the gougers. The Irvinebank Company had been the chief producer but its operations were not a financial success. High cartage costs to the mill and water supply were problems, as was the old and troublesome ball mill, whereas the company's molybdenite plant, erected for the separation of quartz and molybdenite with aid of oily water, was a model of simplicity. Lionel Ball, government geologist, noted that: "The Irvinebank Mining Company's enterprise ... in the hazardous undertaking of wolfram mining demands recognition. Its mines are the deepest and by far the most extensive at Wolfram; and had it not erected a battery, the yield for some years past would have been insignificant, while Wolfram as a town would probably have ceased to exist".

Many of the mines were closed during World War I. In 1915 new rolls were added by the Irvinebank Company to the dry crusher and a roasting furnace was built to treat increased quantities of pyrites. A government subsidy was also used for a road deviation to assist Wolfram miners. In 1916 the Irvinebank Mining Company replaced the ball mill with stamps and installed a dynamo for lighting and a magnetic machine to separate wolfram from bismuth and the impurities from the concentrates. A 66 hp suction gas engine and belt-driven air compressor were erected at Leisner's Wolfram Block mine.

The advent of the Thermo Electric Ore Reduction Corporation of Britain sustained the Wolfram district through the war years with the government paying fixed prices. Mr F.C. Cann was General Manager and consulting engineer. Unfortunately the completion of the company's new and extensive reduction and concentrating works was delayed until 1918 when the first unit of 20 stamps and the concentrating plant became operational.

The corporation's mill was located adjacent to the Irvinebank Mining Company's battery. The new company bought the Irvinebank Company's and other mines, built a new dam, and planned a new gravity treatment plant. The Corporation lost some of its machinery in transit during the war. Twenty head of stamps and an aerial ropeway were erected to treat the wolfram ore in 1918. The mines were formed into groups with common haulage systems. The central collection point for the mines (Liesner's Wolfram Block, Murphy and Geany, Larkin and Wade, Hillside, Hughes, Tully and Mulligan) was the Forget-me-Not mine, and the buckets were transported electrically to the mill.

The Thermo Electric Ore Reduction Corporation failed to survive the slump in metal prices after the return to free market forces in March 1920. Within weeks Wolfram Camp was almost deserted. It is presumed that the mill ceased to operate from this time and was dismantled as the next wolfram mining revival in 1926 saw the Queensland Rare Metal Company erecting a new battery on the site of the Irvinebank Mining Company's previous 10 head battery.

== Description ==
The place contains four separate groups of structural foundations in addition to a number of breached weirs along Bulluburrah Creek. A group of concrete foundations and engine mounts on the west side of the Wolfram road form the remains of the Irvinebank Company mill powerhouse and molybdenite tower.

Opposite, on the eastern side of the road, a series of terraced building surfaces retained by heavy dry stone walls, formed the foundations of the Thermo Electric Ore Reduction Corporation's store and office. A feature of this group is the form-cast concrete walls of the office, which remain in good condition, though without a roof.

The Thermo Electric Corporation mill foundations to the south are connected to the store and office by a benched track supported by a rock retaining wall. The mill foundations are extensive and comprise massive retaining walls of rough-dressed stone blocks, supporting eight terraced benches with concrete machinery mounts and rendered surfaces. A fourth group of machinery mounts south of the mill comprise the boiler room and power plant foundations.

== Heritage listing ==
Thermo Electric Ore Reduction Corporation Mill was listed on the Queensland Heritage Register on 7 April 2004 having satisfied the following criteria.

The place is important in demonstrating the evolution or pattern of Queensland's history.

The Thermo Electric Ore Reduction Corporation Mill at Wolfram is important in demonstrating the evolution of rare mineral mining and processing practices in Queensland in the early 20th century. The mill provides physical evidence of an important shift in mining practices and employment in the Hodgkinson River area, from gold to rare mineral mining and processing.

The Thermo Electric Ore Reduction Corporation Mill is significant in Queensland's history as an example of overseas (British) capital funding a state-of-the-art ore processing works, which was short-lived (18 months) due to foreign market influences and an inability to diversify.

The mill and associated remains, especially the scale of the mill foundations, demonstrate the scale and economic importance of wolfram mining in north Queensland in the years prior to, and during, World War One.

The place demonstrates rare, uncommon or endangered aspects of Queensland's cultural heritage.

The mill is representative of an uncommon mining practice in north Queensland, that of rare mineral mining of molybdenite and bismuth.

The Thermo Electro Co. office, a 1918 form-cast concrete building, is unique in relation to early twentieth century mining in north Queensland. The heavy stone retaining walls with concrete machinery mounts rise up the steep slope in eight terraced benches and are the largest and most massive mill foundations recorded in north Queensland.

The place is important in demonstrating a high degree of creative or technical achievement at a particular period.

The mill is significant due to its association with John Moffat, who between 1872 and 1918, played an important role in the development of the base metal mining industry in north Queensland. The mill is representative of Moffat's efforts to diversify his mining activities in the north, particularly his activities involving the extraction, processing and export of rare metals.
