= Goodenia effusa =

Scientific classification
- Kingdom: Plantae
- Clade: Tracheophytes
- Clade: Angiosperms
- Clade: Eudicots
- Clade: Asterids
- Order: Asterales
- Family: Goodeniaceae
- Genus: Goodenia
- Species: G. effusa

Binomial name
- Goodenia effusa A.E.Holland

Species of plant

Goodenia effusa is a species of flowering plant in the family Goodeniaceae and is endemic to Queensland. It is an annual herb with many stems, needle-shaped, often curved leaves, and racemes of yellow flowers with brown veins.

== Description ==
Goodenia effusa is a spreading annual herb with many stems and that typically grows to a height of 40 cm (16 in). The leaves are needle-shaped, 10–70 mm (0.39–2.76 in) long, 0.3–0.5 mm (0.012–0.020 in) wide and often curved. The flowers are arranged in racemes up to 150 mm (5.9 in) long, each flower on a pedicel 8–35 mm (0.31–1.38 in) long and with leaf-like bracts at the base. The sepals are narrow egg-shaped, 2–4 mm (0.079–0.157 in) long and the corolla is yellow and 12–16 mm (0.47–0.63 in) long. The lower lobes of the corolla are 1.5–3 mm (0.059–0.118 in) long with wings 1–2 mm (0.039–0.079 in) wide. Flowering mainly occurs from March to May and the fruit is more or less spherical, slightly flattened capsule 3–6 mm (0.12–0.24 in) in diameter.

== Taxonomy and naming ==
Goodenia effusa was first formally described in 2015 by Ailsa E. Holland in the journal Telopea from material collected near Georgetown in 2011. The specific epithet (effusa) refers to the species' diffuse, many-branched habit.

== Distribution and habitat ==
This goodenia grows in open woodland in the area between Chillagoe, the Lynd junction, Croydon and Dimbulah in Queensland.

== Conservation status ==
Goddenia effusa is classified as of "least concern" under the Queensland Government Nature Conservation Act 1992.
