= Totley Township =

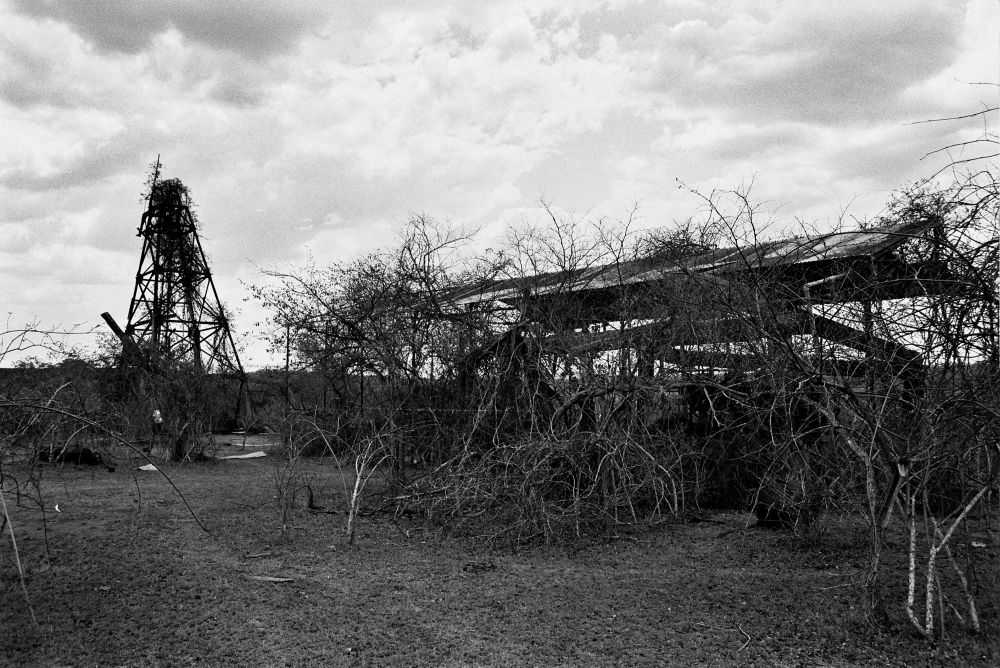
- Totley Mine

- Location within Queensland Location within Australia
- 20.0794°S 146.8821°E
- Location: Charters Towers Mining District, Ravenswood, Charters Towers Region, Queensland, Australia

History
- Design period: 1870s–1890s (late 19th century)
- Built: c. 1883–c. 1964

Queensland Heritage Register
- Official name: Totley Township, Great Extended Mill, Great Extended Mine, King's New Mill and Tramway
- Type: state heritage (built, archaeological)
- Designated: 21 October 1992
- Reference no.: 600457
- Significant period: 1880s, 1940s (fabric); 1883–1890, 1947–1964 (historical)
- Significant components: machinery/plant/equipment – mining/mineral processing, mullock heap, tank – storage, shaft, abutments – road bridge, mounting block/stand, settling tank / pond, shed – machinery, embankment – tramway, forge/blacksmithy, headframe

Totley Township is a heritage-listed mining camp at Charters Towers Mining District, Ravenswood, Charters Towers Region, Queensland, Australia. It is 2.2 kilometres (1.4 mi) north of the centre of Ravenswood.

The township was built from c. 1883 to c. 1964. It is also known as Great Extended Mill, Great Extended Mine, and King's New Mill & Tramway. It was added to the Queensland Heritage Register on 21 October 1992.

== History ==
=== Great Extended Mine ===
Ravenswood struggled to maintain its status as an important gold producer during the 1870s but in early 1880, a silver-lead discovery at Totley, about 2 kilometres (1.2 mi) from Ravenswood led to renewed prosperity.

Richard King developed the first silver mine during 1881 and 1882, but realized he needed more capital to exploit the mine. Accordingly, he launched the Ravenswood Silver Mining Company Limited, with £60,000 in £1 shares, in Sydney in June 1882 and installed new plant and surface buildings. This activity sparked a small rush for silver properties and by the end of 1883 there were rival companies on adjacent leases trying to intersect the lode at deep levels.

The Great Extended Ravenswood Mining Company spent over £2,000 on surface plant (headframe, winding gear and two engines), and the shaft was sunk to 209 metres (686 ft) on the vertical and to a further 30.5 metres (100 ft) on the underlie once the lode was intersected. Although one assay was of 5,000 ozs of silver to the ton, results were disappointing compared with the adjacent King's mine.

There was a fatality (Alfred Cook) in the mine in 1886 and the mine manager (Frederick Wolff) was fined after admitting that the brace was faulty.

The Great Extended Company, with strong financial backing, was sustained more by hope than metal returns. Indeed, the rich 1885 assay influenced wanton expenditure on an elaborate treatment plant costing £11,500, even though by 1888, when the mine's treatment works were completed, the amount of driving and stoping after the shaft had cut the lode, was minimal and only 2,000 tons had been stacked.

Operations at the mine ceased in 1890, probably due to speculative investment, which led to over-capitalisation, rather than because of falling silver prices, which had been sliding since 1886, or the loss of a silver consignment on the ill-fated RMS Quetta.

In 1947 Percy Kean Jnr. commissioned a mining engineer, Archibald Woodville Wilson to report on the prospects for King's freehold and M.L. 363 which included the Great Extended shaft. Wilson reported the Great Extended shaft had definitely proved a large lode formation with 180 to 206 metres (591 to 676 ft) vertical depth, from 1.5 to 3.6 metres (4 ft 11 in to 11 ft 10 in) in width with phenomenally high metal values at 198 metres (650 ft) depth. Kean decided to go ahead with development and purchased the mining plant at the Louisa mine, near Maytown, on the Palmer River goldfields. By 1949 he had erected the steel headframe, recollared the shaft and installed the Vickers generator and a 220 h.p. MAN diesel engine from the Louisa, and a new winding engine. However attempts to dewater the mine were unsuccessful so he pumped out the nearby King's mine.

In 1952, Thomas Heywood Connah, a government geologist, recommended further investigation of the front portion of the lode and Kean renewed equipment and continued mining. With the market depressed in 1953, Kean decided to abandon both mines. Kean's enterprise had produced 3,034 ozs of silver, 20 tons of lead and less than 100 tons of zinc concentrates.

Kean sublet the Great Extended lease to a Sydney company, Silver Horizons No Liability in 1964. They employed nine men to dewater the mine and clean out the stopes before mining but poor assay results discouraged further work and they withdrew. The mine has been abandoned since, although most of the machinery remains on site.

=== King's New Mill and Tramway ===
Richard King, realising that he needed capital to further develop his mine, launched the Ravenswood Silver Mining Company Limited with £60,000 capital in June 1882. The treatment works were erected by 1883 and consisted of a Hope's stone breaker, a set of 75-centimetre (30 in) rolls, a Hancock jig, 35-centimetre (14 in) raff wheel, pulleys and trommels; and the workforce doubled to 46 men. In 1883, 371 tons of high grade ore valued at £11,872 were exported. In 1884, the despatch by railway of 853 tons of concentrate valued at £19,566 reflected the increased productivity. In 1885, despite temporary suspension of operations due to drought, 866 tons of concentrate valued at £21,568 were dispatched. In 1886, 743 tons valued at £19,036 were exported and in 1887, the output was 899 tons valued at £20,632.

The township of Totley was surveyed in 1886 and the King family dominated the lives of the residents: Richard was the managing director of the Ravenswood Silver Mining Company; Edward was the mine manager; William owned the boarding house and store; and George ran the brickworks. Over half the streets of the township were named after King family members.

Following favourable official assessments of the ore potential in King's freehold, a Melbourne syndicate bought into the Ravenswood Silver Mining Company and refloated it, under the same name, on the English market. With over 30,000 tons of tailings in the dumps, the new company proposed an elaborate treatment plant to be housed in an all brick building on One Mile Creek, connected by an endless chain tramway to the mine, at a cost of £15,000.

The mill was completed in 1889 and equipped by Sandycroft and Company, of Chester U.K., with three engines aggregating 54 h.p., Cornish boilers, piston jiggers, stone breakers, two pairs of rollers, two raff wheels and elevators, classifier, three sluices, six 4.9-metre (16 ft) Borleas round buddles, picking tables, three Frue vanners and a separator. Richard King remained as director of the company and Edward King as mine manager. When operations resumed in 1890, the mill ran only briefly yielding 274 tons of concentrate valued at £6,411. Soon after it closed permanently and King's mine was let to tributors but it too closed at the end of 1891 when the company abandoned its leases.

In 1924 Percy Kean Snr. acquired King's freehold and commenced dewatering King's shaft but the task proved too much for their machinery and finances. After World War 2, King's freehold and M.L.363, which included the neighbouring Great Extended Shaft, were taken over by Percy Kean Jnr., who decided to recommence operations. However water inflow was again a problem and Kean decided to pump out King's shaft. In 1951 Kean raised 50 tons of galena from King's mine and rather than re-equip King's mill he had his ore processed at Partridge's mill on Elphinstone Creek. However, with falling prices, Kean decided in 1953 to abandon both mines.

=== Great Extended Mill ===
The Great Extended Mill was developed in conjunction with the Great Extended Mine. A rich assay in 1885 influenced £11,500 expenditure on an elaborate treatment plant which was completed in 1888. It consisted of three 54 h.p. steam engines, six Jordan and Cummins patent jiggers, a Black and Marsden stone breaker, winding and pumping gear, six revolving screens, two Linkenbach round buddles, classifier, elevators, picking tables, grizzly and spitzcasten.

The works were located on One Mile Creek, about 200 metres (660 ft) downstream from King's New Mill. Schemes were proposed for connecting the mill to the Great Extended Mine by a wire tramway and for constructing a pumping engine at Rocky Point on Elphinstone Creek with underground pipes to a reservoir to ensure sufficient water supply to the mill. However, apart from trial runs, the works never treated a single ton of ore for export and they were sold to the Mount Albion Silver Mining Company, operating at Montalbion near Irvinebank, and dismantled at the end of 1891.

== Description ==
=== Great Extended Mine ===
The site contains a steel headframe of asymmetrical design which is located over a timbered shaft. Erosion of the shaft collar has fully exposed one of the concrete footings of the headframe. A mullock dump is located immediately west of the headframe. East of the headframe is an open-sided engine shed of corrugated iron on a timber and steel frame, containing a winding engine on a brick mount and a large four- cylinder MAN diesel engine with a Vickers generator. The engine shed also contains a compressor and marble slab electrical switchboard. A security fence has recently been erected around the engine shed.

The surviving plant includes:

- Four-cylinder (marine type) diesel engine with flywheel – M.A.N.
- DC generator (coupled to the M.A.N. diesel engine) – Vickers
- Small diesel engine – General Motors
- Electric winding engine – James Steel Engineers Marrickville Sydney
- Headframe steelwork – Dorman Long Middlesbrough.

=== King's New Mill and Tramway ===
The site contains brick milling and machinery foundations located within a 50-metre (160 ft) square area on the east bank of One Mile Creek. A dominant structure is a brick mount that was probably associated with the terminus of the endless chain tramway. A stone forge is located at the north of the place. Structural evidence of the mill is minimal and difficult to interpret. The formation of the tramway running east from the mill features a raised ramp with stone abutments to allow its passage under Birkby Street, Totley.

=== Great Extended Mill ===
Mill foundations are located on the bank of a creek and include rendered brick concentration tanks and two concrete buddle bases each 8 metres (26 ft) in diameter with four outer annular channels of concrete. Adjacent to and immediately south of the buddles is a large rendered brick settling pond. There is minimal evidence of the mill building/s or other plant. The site of a large tailings dump is still evident to the south and east of the mill.

== Heritage listing ==
Totley Township was listed on the Queensland Heritage Register on 21 October 1992 having satisfied the following criteria.

The place is important in demonstrating the evolution or pattern of Queensland's history.

The Great Extended Mine at Totley is significant as a silver mining operation which was sustained more by hope than metal returns during two separate phases: 1883–1890 and 1947–1964.

Despite minimal structural evidence of the mill, other than machinery foundations of brick covering a 50-metre (160 ft) square area, the tramway formation running east from the mill site is still visible with raised embankments with stone abutments to allow its passage under the streets of Totley township. This archaeological remnant is rare surviving evidence of the transport system from mine to mill and illustrates the speculative enterprise of the King family in their overcapitalized attempt to establish a viable silver mining industry in the Charters Towers district.

The Great Extended Mill's locational association with King's New Mill illustrates the competition of rival companies during a speculative boom period through the duplication of facilities.

The place demonstrates rare, uncommon or endangered aspects of Queensland's cultural heritage.

The steel headframe over the mine is the only asymmetrical steel headframe recorded in North Queensland and, together with the MAN diesel engine and Vickers generator, was associated with the Wolfram molybdenite field and the Palmer River goldfield.

Despite minimal structural evidence of the mill, other than machinery foundations of brick covering a 50-metre (160 ft) square area, the tramway formation running east from the mill site is still visible with raised embankments with stone abutments to allow its passage under the streets of Totley township. This archaeological remnant is rare surviving evidence of the transport system from mine to mill and illustrates the speculative enterprise of the King family in their overcapitalized attempt to establish a viable silver mining industry in the Charters Towers district.

The Great Extended Mill, Totley, is significant as a rare example of a silver processing mill in the Charters Towers district and one of only two sites recorded in North Queensland where Linkenbach buddles were installed.

The place is important in demonstrating the principal characteristics of a particular class of cultural places.

The mine in its early phase was associated with poor management, accidents and a fatality, and in its later phase with experimentation by Percy Kean. The Great Extended Mine at Totley is one of the few readily accessible sites with early haulage plant and machinery still in position and physical evidence of mining remaining.

The place is important in demonstrating a high degree of creative or technical achievement at a particular period.

The plant was imported by the La Societe Francaise des Metaux Rares company in 1912 and re-located to the Louisa mine on the Palmer in 1915. The MAN diesel engine is also associated with the beginnings of the use diesel technology in Queensland mining, This demonstrates the reuse of equipment and technology from one field to another and its creative adaptation to suit different mining conditions forty years later.

The place has a special association with the life or work of a particular person, group or organisation of importance in Queensland's history.

King's New Mill and Tramway is significant through its association with the enterprising King family, pioneers of Totley silver mining and milling.

== See also ==
- List of tramways in Queensland
