= Kingsburgh =

Kingsburgh may refer to:

- Kingsburgh, KwaZulu-Natal, South Africa
- Kingsburgh, Skye, Highland, Scotland
- Kingsburgh, California, former name of Kingsburg, California, United States
- Kingsborough, Queensland, a former mining town in Australia
