= Wolfram, Queensland =

Wolfram
- Town
- Coordinates: 17.0821°S 144.9642°E
- Country: Australia
- State: Queensland
- LGA: Shire of Mareeba
- Location: 23.7 km (14.7 mi) WNW of Dimbulah; 70.0 km (43.5 mi) WSW of Mareeba; 132 km (82 mi) WSW of Cairns; 441 km (274 mi) NNW of Townsville; 1,791 km (1,113 mi) NNW of Brisbane

Government
  - State electorate: Cook
  - Federal division: Kennedy
- Postcode: 4872

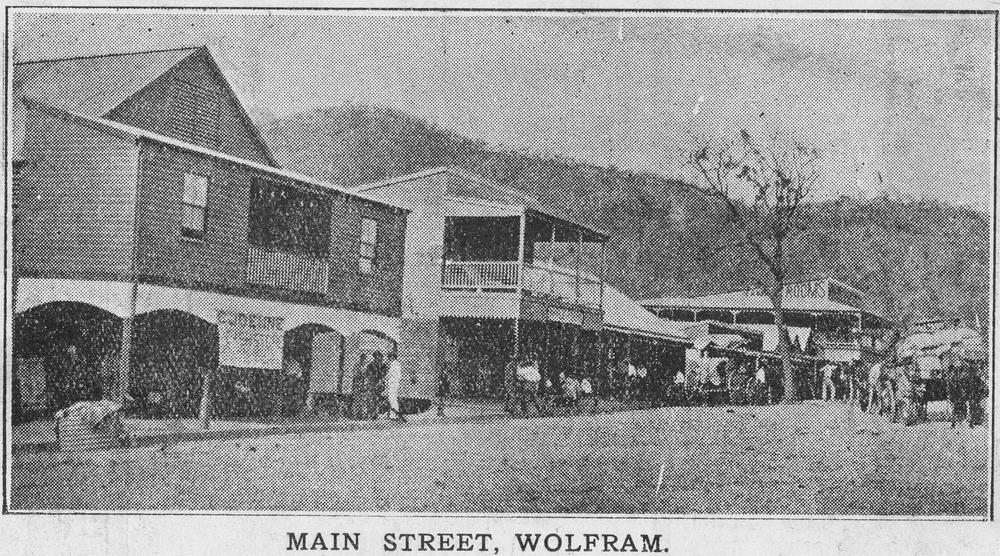
Historic photo of Main street, Wolfram

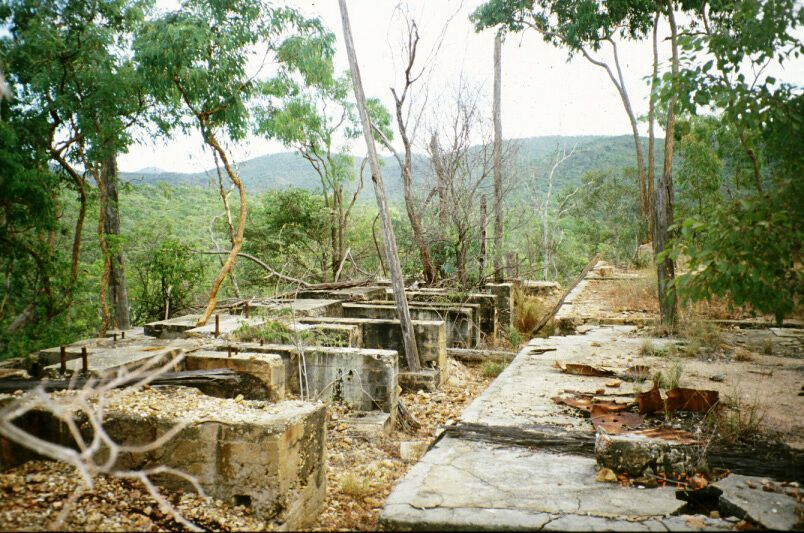
Foundations of Thermo Electric Ore Reduction Corporation Mill (2003)

Wolfram is a former mining town within the locality of Dimbulah in the Shire of Mareeba in Queensland, Australia, now a ghost town.

== Geography ==
Wolfram is about 90 kilometres (56 miles) west of Cairns and 15 kilometres (9.3 miles) south of Thornborough. It was also known as Wolfram Camp. It is at an altitude of approximately 538 metres.

== History ==
The mineral wolfram (from which the town derives its name) was discovered in the area in 1891 and attracted miners from neighbouring mining regions such as Thornborough and the Palmer River, forming a settlement known initially as Wolfram Camp.

== Wolfram today ==
Today there are few visible remains of the settlement. There are some concrete foundations of long-gone buildings, headstones in the cemetery, and a row of mango trees that mark where the school used to be.

== Heritage listings ==
Wolfram has a number of sites listed on the Queensland Heritage Register including:

- La Société Française des Métaux Rares treatment plant, Main Street
- Thermo Electric Ore Reduction Corporation Mill, Wolfram Road

== Notable people ==
- Bunny Adair, Member of the Queensland Legislative Assembly for Cook was born in Wolfram
