= Kingsborough, Queensland =

Kingsborough
- Town
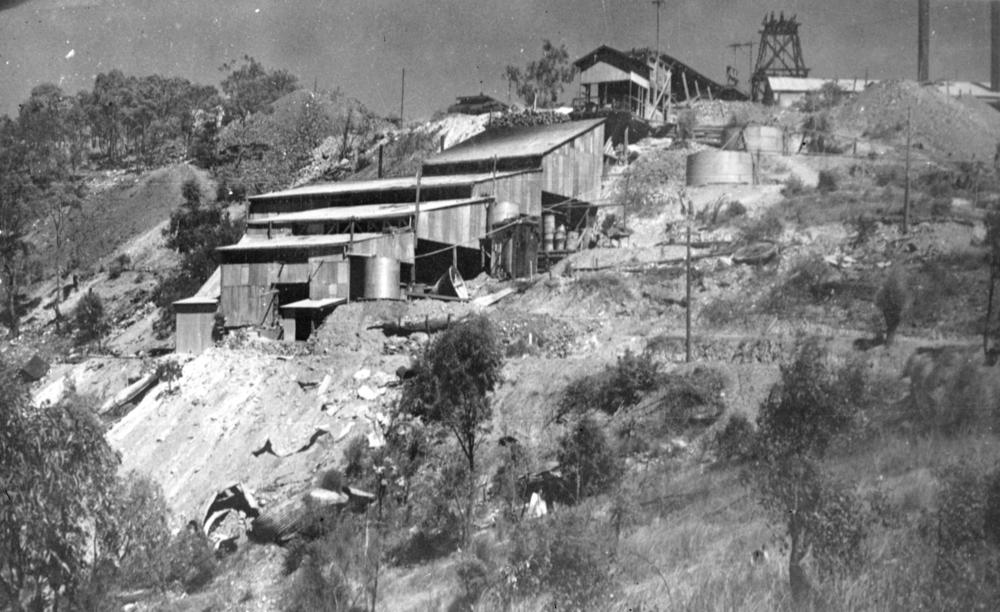
- Tyrconnell gold mine battery, between Kingsborough and Thornborough, Hodgkinson goldfield, 1936

- Coordinates: 16.9236°S 145.0386°E
- Country: Australia
- State: Queensland
- LGA: Shire of Mareeba
- Location: 35.7 km (22.2 mi) N of Dimbulah; 79.8 km (49.6 mi) WNW of Mareeba; 142 km (88 mi) W of Cairns; 1,780 km (1,110 mi) NNW of Brisbane

Government
  - State electorate: Cook
  - Federal division: Kennedy
- Time zone: UTC+10:00 (AEST)
- Postcode: 4871

Kingsborough is a small historic mining town in the locality of Thornborough in the Shire of Mareeba, Queensland, Australia. It was part of the Hodgkinson Minerals Area.

== History ==
Kingston Post Office opened around 1876, was renamed Kingsborough in 1877 and closed in 1924.

The first hotel was opened by James McGroarty in 1876 and others soon followed.

A Roman Catholic chapel opened in 1878.

The Town of Kingsborough appears on a 1880 survey plan.

Kingsborough State School opened circa 1882 and closed in 1924.

== Heritage listings ==
Kingsborough has a number of heritage-listed sites, including:

- General Grant Mine, off Dimbulah-Mount Mulligan Road (16.9227°S 145.028°E)
- Kingsborough Battery, off Kingsborough-Thornborough Road (former East Street, 16.9275°S 145.0383°E)
- Tyrconnel Mine and Battery, Kingsborough-Thornborough Road (16.9347°S 145.0351°E)

== Education ==
There are no schools in Kingsborough. The nearest government primary school is Dimbulah State School in Dimbulah to the south; the school also offers secondary schooling to Year 10. For secondary schooling to Year 12, the nearest government secondary school is Mareeba State High School in Mareeba to the south-east, but it is probably too distant for a daily commute, with distance education and boarding school as the alternatives.
