= Thornborough, Queensland =

Thornborough
- Town
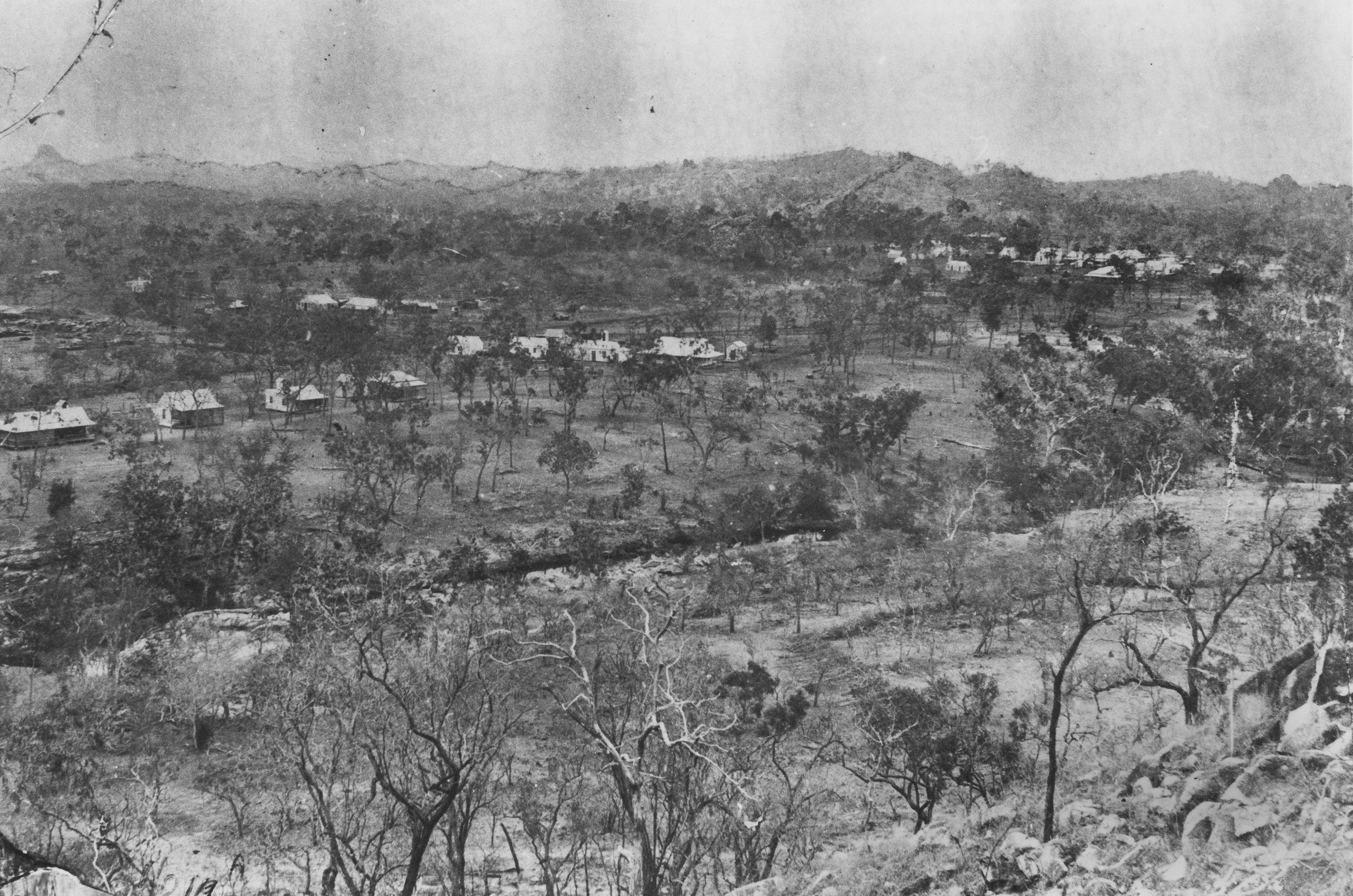
- View of Thornborough township, circa 1913

- Interactive map of Thornborough
- Coordinates: 16.9425°S 145.0083°E
- Country: Australia
- State: Queensland
- LGA: Shire of Mareeba
- Location: 21.0 km (13.0 mi) NNE of Dimbulah; 58.1 km (36.1 mi) W of Mareeba; 120 km (75 mi) W of Cairns; 1,776 km (1,104 mi) NNW of Brisbane

Government
  - State electorate: Cook
  - Federal division: Kennedy

Area
  - Total: 415.4 km^{2} (160.4 sq mi)

Population
  - Total: 21 (2021 census)
  - Density: 0.0506/km^{2} (0.1309/sq mi)
- Time zone: UTC+10:00 (AEST)
- Postcode: 4871
Localities around Thornborough
Mount Mulligan	Mount Mulligan	Glen Russell
Chillagoe	Thornborough	Glen Russell
Chillagoe	Dimbulah	Arriga; Mutchilba

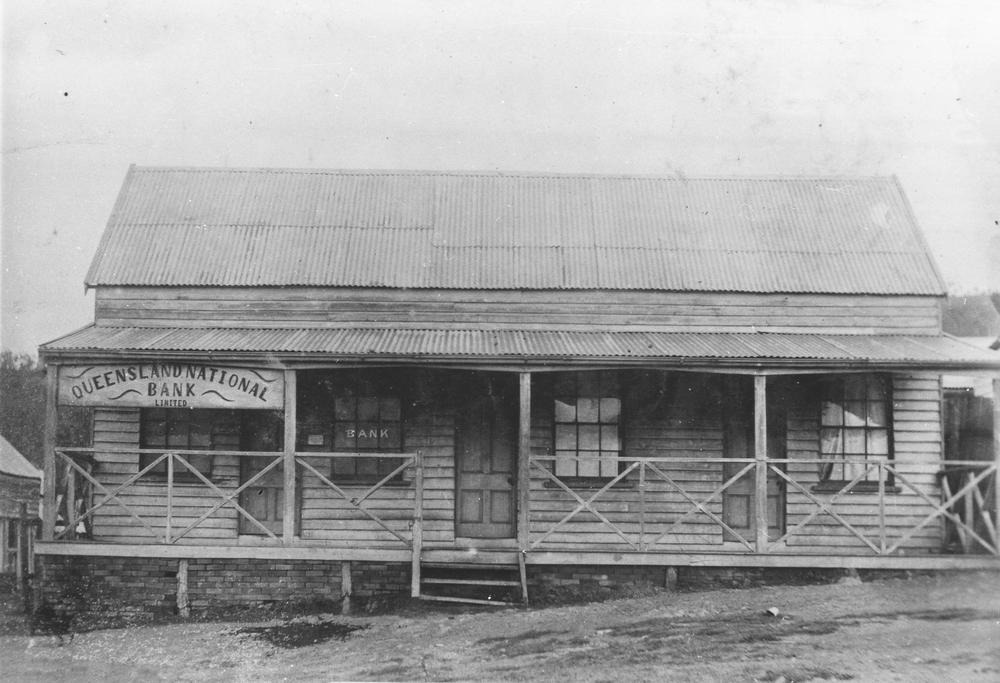
Queensland National Bank, Thornborough, ca. 1888

Thornborough is a rural town and locality in the Shire of Mareeba, Queensland, Australia. The town rose to prominence in the 1870s as a gold mining town in the Hodgkinson Minerals Area, but there are very few buildings remaining in the town. In the 2021 census, the locality of Thornborough had a population of 21 people.

== Geography ==
The town of Kingsborough, another former mining town, is located to the north-east of the town of Thornborough (16.9236°S 145.0386°E). Beaconsfield is a neighbourhood within the east of the locality (16.9666°S 145.1166°E).

Thornborough has the following mountains:

- Bulls Pinnacles in the east of the locality (16.9464°S 145.1474°E)
- Mount Mcleod in the south-east of the locality (17.0347°S 145.2062°E) 807 metres (2,648 ft)
- Mount Roberts in the north-west of the locality (16.9451°S 144.9829°E) 537 metres (1,762 ft)

Mount Mulligan Road enters the locality from the south (Dimbulah), passes the town of Thornborough to the south-east, and then exits to the north-west (Mount Mulligan). The Thornborough Kingsborough Road commences from Mount Mulligan Road as it passes the town of Thornborough and provides access to the towns of Thornborough and Kingsborough.

The Hodgkinson River rises in Glen Russell to the east and then flows through the locality through the town of Thornborough before exiting to the north-west (Mount Mulligan). It ultimately becomes a tributary of the Mitchell River, which flows into the Gulf of Carpentaria.

The land use is grazing on native vegetation, but there are many former gold mines in and around the towns of Thornborough and Kingsborough.

== History ==
Thornborough was named in 1876 after George Henry Thorn, the then Queensland Premier.

By May 1877, the streets were laid out and named after pioneers of north Queensland, such as James Venture Mulligan and William (Billy) McLeod and Muirson.

Thornborough Provisional School opened circa 1878. In 1909, it became Thornborough State School. It operated as a half-time school in conjunction with Dimbulah School (meaning the schools shared a single teacher) in 1918 and then closed. It reopened in 1920 and closed in 1925.

Kingsborough State School opened circa 1882 and closed in 1924.

Wolfram Camp Provisional School opened in 1905. On 1 January 1909, it became Wolfram Camp State School and was renamed that year to be Wolfram State School. It closed in 1930, reopened in 1938 and then closed finally circa 1940.

== Demographics ==
In the 2016 census, the locality of Thornborough had a population of 9 people.

In the 2021 census, the locality of Thornborough had a population of 21 people.

== Heritage listings ==
Thorborough has a number of heritage-listed sites, including:

- General Grant Mine, off Dimbulah–Mount Mulligan Road, Kingsborough (16.9227°S 145.028°E)
- Kingsborough Battery, off former East Street (now Kingsborough–Thornborough Road), Kingsborough (16.9275°S 145.0383°E)
- Tyrconnel Mine and Battery, Kingsborough–Thornborough Road (16.9347°S 145.0351°E)

== Education ==
There are no schools in the locality of Thornborough. The nearest government primary school is Dimbulah State School in neighbouring Dimbulah to the south. The nearest government secondary schools are Dimbulah State School (to Year 10) and Mareeba State High School (to Year 12) in Mareeba to the east. However, students in some parts of the locality may be too distant to attend either of these schools; the alternatives are distance education and boarding school.

There is a Catholic primary school in Dimbulah, while Mareeba has both a Catholic primary and secondary schools.
