= La Société Française des Métaux Rares treatment plant =

- Location within Queensland Location within Australia
- 17.0749°S 144.9711°E
- Location: Wolfram, Dimbulah, Shire of Mareeba, Queensland, Australia

History
- Design period: 1900–1914 (early 20th century)
- Built: 1911–1913

Queensland Heritage Register
- Official name: La Societe Francaise des Metaux Rares treatment plant (former), Former French Company Rare Metal Treatment Plant Site Upper Wolfram
- Type: state heritage (archaeological)
- Designated: 4 July 2006
- Reference no.: 602583
- Significant period: 1911–1913 (fabric and historical use)
- Significant components: trench, mounting block/stand, terracing, slab/s – concrete, machinery/plant/equipment – mining/mineral processing, platform, mullock heap, pit – machinery

La Société Française des Métaux Rares treatment plant is a heritage-listed smelting works at Wolfram, Dimbulah, Shire of Mareeba, Queensland, Australia. It was built from 1911 to 1913. It is also known as French Company Rare Metal Treatment Plant Site. It was added to the Queensland Heritage Register on 4 July 2006.

== History ==
The former La Société Française des Métaux Rares treatment plant operated between 1911 and 1913. The plant used an unusual dry blowing treatment process for the rare mineral, wolfram.

Wolfram was discovered in 1894 in the headwaters of the Hodgkinson River scattered over the surface as bunches in quartzose boulders or in drifts interdispersed with coarse gravel. In 1899 when wolfram was at its highest price, 240 long tons (240 t) were sent away for £38 per 1 long ton (1.0 t).

The township, Wolfram, named after the mineral, formed on the banks of the Bulluburrah Creek in two parts, Upper Wolfram or Top Camp, and Lower Wolfram or Bottom Camp.

In 1900, 91 pounds (41 kg) of molybdenite was discovered at Wolfram. This was said to contain some of the finest specimens of molybdenite discovered in Australia. There were 100 men working at Wolfram by late 1900, on wolfram, molybdenite, and bismuth. The Irvinebank Mining Company invested at Wolfram in 1900, appointing Alexander Gillan as manager.

Demand for high-grade wolfram, after the development of tungsten as a lamp filament in 1904, and for molybdenite for use in patent alloys, led to an early interest in rare minerals by British firms, the most prominent being Liverpool's George G. Blackwell and Sons. Prices in 1904 for both metals were high — up to £200 a ton for molybdenite and £140 a ton for wolfram. This attracted many goldminers. Of the 1,136 people on the Hodgkinson by 1904, 700 were miners working at Wolfram. By 1909, wolfram was returning £41,820 compared to the value of gold at £7,089. But the rare metals industry was unstable — there was insecurity in the unknown overseas markets where demand fluctuated erratically and local miners were never sure of their returns. So the Wolfram Co-operative Association was formed to arrange advances and shipments through intermediaries such as the New Zealand Loan and Mercantile Agency and WJ Lempriere and Co, but generally, the local industry was poorly organised.

The workings extended without a break from over 3 kilometres (1.9 mi) along the contact of the intrusive granite with older porphyries and slates from high rugged slopes down to the valley of Bulluburrah Creek (QGMJ 15 Jan 1913: 4). Initially, settlement was concentrated on the higher slopes at Top Camp.

From 1904, 2,500 long tons (2,500 t) of wolfram valued at £250,000 were produced at Wolfram Camp, half of which went through Moffatt's Irvinebank Co. Mill. The Irvinebank Mining Company set up a battery on Bullaburrah Creek in the lower valley. This battery was a stabilising influence on Wolfram Camp, although it was closed for long periods throughout 1909 because of strikes over the 44 hour week. It operated again from 1910 to 1912 and was closed in the rationalisation of Irvinebank Mining Company's assets at the end of that year.

The area around the mill in the lower valley became the main settlement after 1907. The township, clustered on a ridge north of the battery, was at its peak during World War I. The wolfram mining industry passed through a depression for several years from 1910, chiefly because of the exhaustion of the residual surface accumulations of ore, thus ending the days of the gouger.

La Société Française des Métaux Rares was registered in Queensland in 1911. That same year Frenchman, Mr Poulet, took over a number of mine dumps and tailing heaps on behalf of French syndicate. The objective was to extract wolfram, molybdenite, and bismuth from the lowest grade mixed-metal ore using a specially designed treatment plant.

The crushing plant was delivered in August 1911 and the earthworks were underway in July 1912 for installation of the plant above Bulluburrah Creek in Upper Wolfram. The power plant imported by the company included an early 240 horsepower MAN diesel engine, type A4V49, weighing nearly 35,000 kilograms (77,000 lb) that was coupled axially to a DC generator. An extensive system of overhead wire ropeways to collect ore from mullock heaps and a dam in Bulluburrah Creek were some of the proposed constructions. The cost of installation was expected to be considerably over £50,000 and required constant employment of 50 people, mostly skilled mechanics.

After a few short and unsuccessful trial runs, the process plant was liquidated in 1913 because of the health hazards associated with the dry blowing process.

The diesel engine was sold to Cooktown syndicate, and transported to the Louisa mine on the Palmer Goldfield. It now resides at the Great Extended Mine, Totley.

Many of the mines were closed during WWI. The Thermo-Electric Ore Reduction Corporation plant built near the site of the Irvinebank Company Mill at Lower Wolfram sustained the district through the war years with the government paying fixed prices. After slumps in metal prices after the return of free market forces in March 1920, the Thermo Co. failed to survive. Wolfram Camp was almost deserted within weeks of its shutdown.

In 1926, Queensland Rare Metal Company erected a new battery on the site of the Irvinebank Mining Company's 10-head battery. As the prices of wolfram and molybdenite were declining, there was little hope of success and the plant worked intermittently, with no crushing in 1934. Increased wolfram prices in 1935 attracted miners back to Wolfram and in 1937, the Pepper mine was dewatered and had 200 men working in the area.

During World War II, 3 tributers worked mines at Wolfram: Larkin, Lansky and Forget-me-Not. In 1946, the contract price for wolfram between the British and Australian governments expired. No further prices were quoted and operations ceased. There were small scale workings at some of the mines in 1947. There was a brief rush after the outbreak of the Korean War in 1951. However, as the price of wolfram fell, many mining activities ceased.

The Mount Arthur Molybdenite Company NL worked several mines in the Wolfram Camp area in the 1970s until they sold their equipment by tender in 1989.

In 2006, there is renewed interest in mining wolfram, molybdenite, and bismuth at Wolfram, and an open cut mining operation approximately 1 kilometre (0.62 mi) south of the site of the former La Société Française des Métaux Rares plant, was proposed. In 2016, the open cut mine was sold to ATC Alloys Limited.

== Description ==
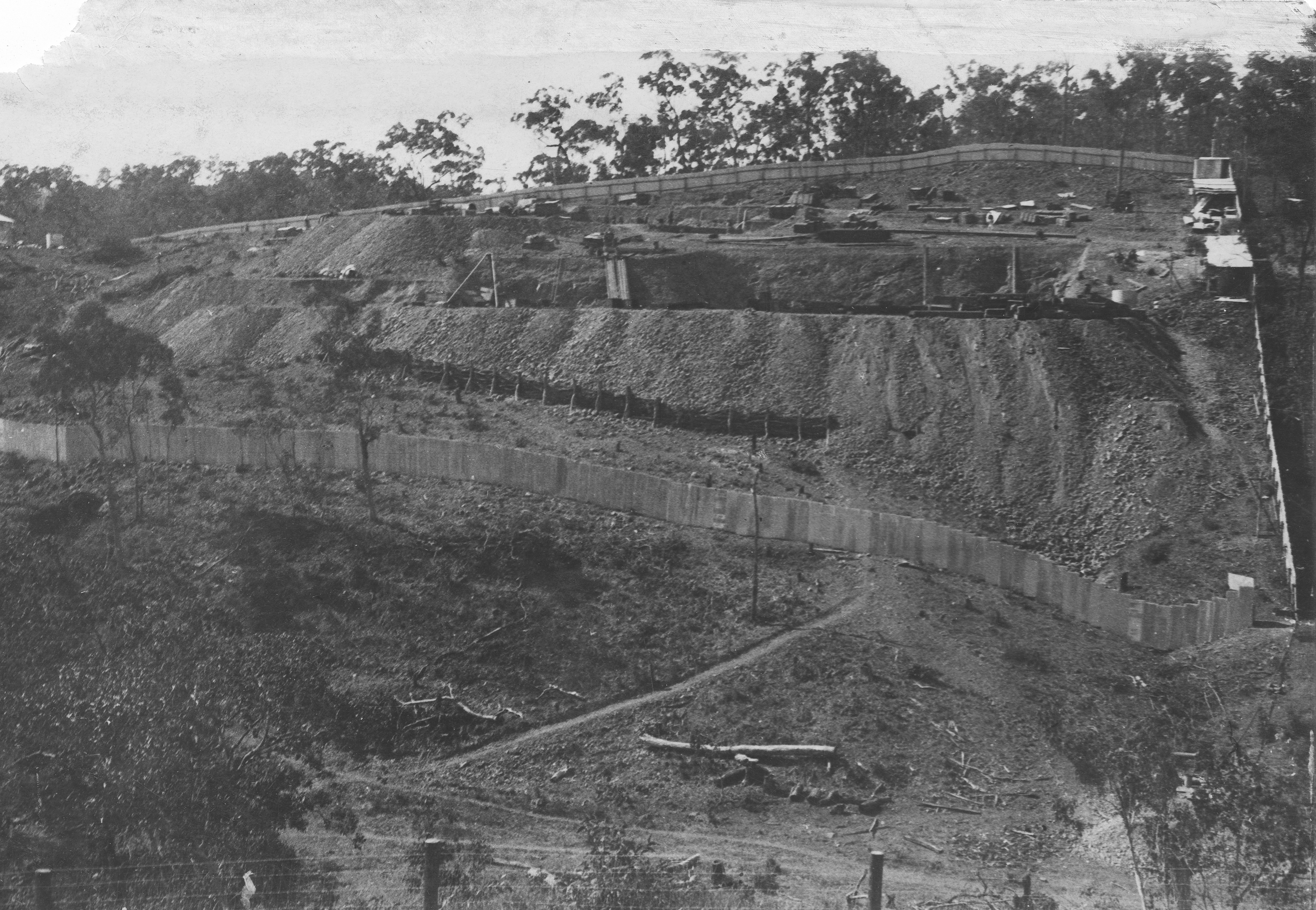
Works site of the Société française des métaux rares, Wolfram, 1912

The site of the former La Société Française des Métaux Rares treatment plant is across six levels excavated from the side of hill on the eastern bank of Bulluburrah Creek.

The principal extant remains are on Levels 3 and 4. Level 3 is a levelled area of approximately 50 by 25 metres (164 ft × 82 ft). It includes a concrete-lined hole, 6 by 8 metres (20 ft × 26 ft) and 5 metres (16 ft) deep. A row of 5 concrete fan blocks of varying sizes are adjacent to the excavated area, on the south side. The largest fan block is 4.4 by 3.2 metres (14 ft × 10 ft) and stands 4 metres (13 ft) high, with a round opening of 1.6 metres (5 ft 3 in) in diameter. There are three smaller concrete blocks, 1.4 to 1.8 metres (4 ft 7 in to 5 ft 11 in) high between the largest fan block and another large fan block that measures 4.3 by 2.9 metres (14.1 ft × 9.5 ft) and stands 2.7 metres (8 ft 10 in) high. It also has a round opening of 1.6-metre (5 ft 3 in) diameter. Two rows of skip track anchor posts, standing 400 millimetres (16 in) high and set in concrete blocks, run north–south on the east and west edges of Level 3.

Level 4 consists of a concrete floor (23 by 5 metres (75 ft × 16 ft)) and a concrete bed (16 by 6 metres (52 ft × 20 ft)) with a complicated arrangement of concrete pits, trenches, and platforms. There two parallel rows of bolts standing upright in a line for 3.5 metres (11 ft), as well as a number of other bolts indicating where the engine was bolted to the floor. A concrete floor with dimensions 23 by 5.1 metres (75 ft × 17 ft) is 8 metres (26 ft) south of the machine site.

Level 5 is the highest level on the site and consists of a flat clay floor approximately 25 by 10 metres (82 ft × 33 ft). Some small pieces of metal fragments are present. Two more excavated levels are evident to the south of Level 5. The first, which appears to be hand-excavated, is 50 by 25 metres (164 ft × 82 ft). Another appears machine excavated and measures 25 by 25 metres (82 ft × 82 ft).

Level 6 is a smaller excavated area to the north of Level 3. A mullock heap extends 40 by 20 metres (131 ft × 66 ft) above Level 6. It consists of quartz, molybdenite, sandstone, and wolfram.

Level 1 and 2 are the lowest levels and the closest to Bulluburrah Creek. Level 1 has a concrete block with a small pulley wheel. A number of cement canister retaining strips can be seen on this level.

Level 2 is above and to the north of Level 1. It contains a few archaeological remains, including part of a steel cable and cement canister retaining strips.

The northern boundary is a straight line starting at a point on Bulluburrah Creek at 17°04′25″S 144°58′21″E and finishing at Bulluburrah Creek at 17°04′25″S 144°58′14″E. The western boundary is Bulluburrah Creek to a point at 17°04′30″S 144°58′12″E. The southern boundary is from this point on the creek to a point on the top of the hill above Level 5 at 17°04′34″S 144°58′21″E. The eastern boundary runs from the point on the top of the hill to the northeasternmost point on Bulluburrah Creek.

== Heritage listing ==
The former Société Française des Métaux Rares treatment plant was listed on the Queensland Heritage Register on 4 July 2006 having satisfied the following criteria.

The place is important in demonstrating the evolution or pattern of Queensland's history.

The former La Société Française des Métaux Rares treatment plant is important in demonstrating the pattern of Queensland mining history. One of four processing plants in the Wolfram area, the treatment plant provides physical evidence of an important shift in milling practices and employment in the Hodgkinson River area, from gold to other mineral mining and processing. The treatment plant represents an uncommon milling practice in north Queensland, that of the mineral, wolfram. The scale of the treatment plant foundations demonstrates the scale and economic importance of wolfram mining in north Queensland in the years prior to WWI.

The place demonstrates rare, uncommon or endangered aspects of Queensland's cultural heritage.

The former La Société Française des Métaux Rares treatment plant has the potential to contribute to our understanding of the different processing methods used in the treatment of wolfram, prior to WWI. The relatively high value of the mineral led to the experimentation with different processing methods such as the dry blowing process used at La Société de Francaise des Metaux Rares treatment plant.

The place is important because of its aesthetic significance.

The former La Société Française des Métaux Rares treatment plant is important because of its aesthetic significance. As an abandoned industrial ruin complex in a secluded dry bushland setting, the place evokes a strong aesthetic response. The remains of the treatment plant, over 6 terraced levels, exhibit a "sense of remoteness" enhanced by the place's isolation, landscape, scale and setting.
