= General Grant Mine =

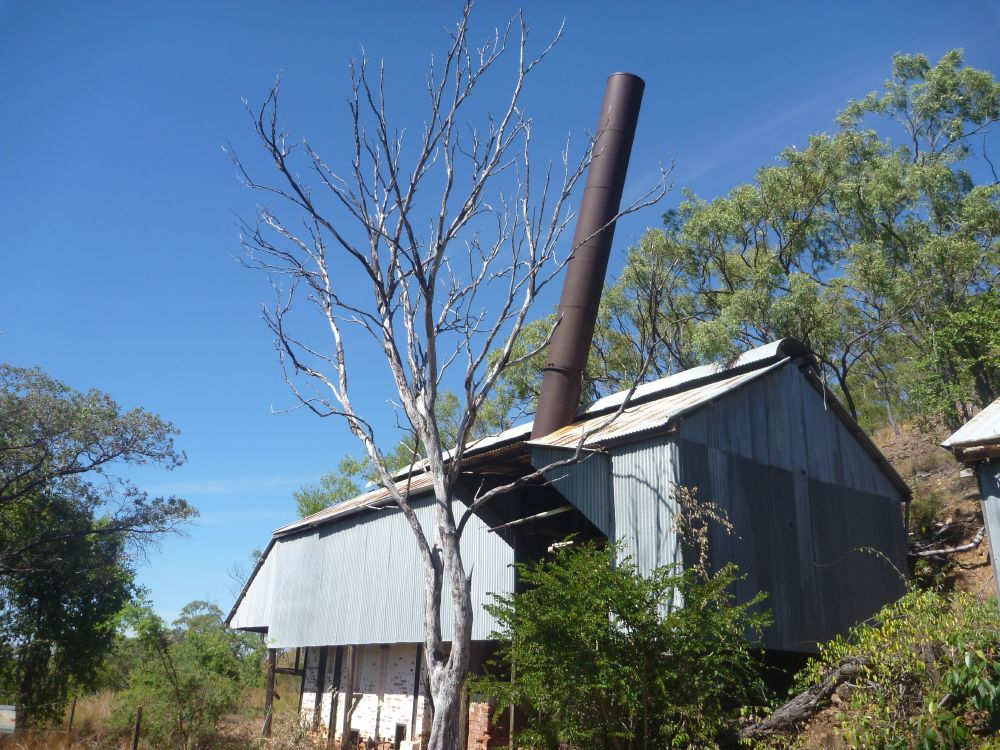
- General Grant Mine and Winding Plant, 2012

- Location within Queensland Location within Australia
- 16.9227°S 145.028°E
- Location: Off Dimbulah–Mount Mulligan Road, Kingsborough, Shire of Mareeba, Queensland, Australia

History
- Design period: 1870s–1890s (late 19th century)
- Built: c. 1878–1930s

Queensland Heritage Register
- Official name: General Grant Mine and Winding Plant
- Type: state heritage (built, archaeological)
- Designated: 21 October 1992
- Reference no.: 600683
- Significant period: c. 1878–1930s (fabric, historical)
- Significant components: workshop, shaft, chimney/chimney stack, shed – winding, machinery/plant/equipment – mining/mineral processing, shed/s, terracing, mullock heap, adit, forge/blacksmithy

General Grant Mine is a heritage-listed mine off Dimbulah–Mount Mulligan Road, Kingsborough, Shire of Mareeba, Queensland, Australia. It was built from c. 1878 to the 1930s. It was added to the Queensland Heritage Register on 21 October 1992.

== History ==
The Hodgkinson Goldfield was proclaimed on 15 June 1876. Although the Hodgkinson was geologically similar to the great alluvial gold field to the north, the Palmer, it was predominantly a reefing field with its major mines in the vicinity of the now abandoned townships of Kingsborough, Thornborough and Northcote. It was a neglected field through lack of capital, and although there was an optimistic outlook until the first decade of the twentieth century, it was clear by 1908 that its small yield no longer justified separate goldfield administration and accordingly, in 1909 it was incorporated into the Chillagoe Gold and Mineral field.

There was an initial rush of over 2,000 men and up to 1877 it was estimated that over 100,000 ounces (2,800,000 g) of gold had been produced from gravel and reef; in 1878 over 44,000 ounces (1,200,000 g); then a decline until 1891, when only 655 ounces (18,600 g) was produced. Since then there was rising production to 4,853 ounces (137,600 g) in 1901.

The General Grant reef up to the end of 1882 recorded seventeen crushings totalling 957 long tons (972 t) of ore yielding 1,281 ounces (36,300 g) of gold. The workings remained idle between 1883 and 1893, but in the next two years produced 1,048 long tons (1,065 t) of ore yielding 1,402 ounces (39,700 g).

The revival was unexpected, but the opening of the Tablelands railway from Cairns to Mareeba in 1893 had made the field more accessible and increased use of cyanding promised improved returns for reefing fields. The real impetus came in 1897 when the British group, the Cecil Syndicate focused on the General Grant mine.

With an infusion of capital not previously witnessed in the area, the syndicate erected sophisticated surface plant and sunk the shaft to 177 metres (581 ft). Between 1898 and 1910, it returned 25,622 ounces (726,400 g) of bullion gold from 27,145 long tons (27,581 t) of ore. In 1902, when the shaft reached the reef at the 150-metre (490 ft) level the syndicate decided to erect a battery at the mine and constructed a 10,000,000-imperial-gallon (45,000,000 L; 12,000,000 US gal) capacity dam. However crushing from the mine did not even recoup the £8,000 outlaid on the construction of the dam, battery and cyanide plant.

Intermittent working resulted in the shaft reaching the 229-metre (751 ft) level by 1937 when it was owned by the Hodgkinson Gold Development Syndicate Limited. The reef was under consideration for dewatering and re-opening in late 1944, when it was thought that at least 8,000 long tons (8,100 t) of ore, with an average grade of 0.4 ounces (11 g) gold, remained and although the grade is said to have improved at the bottom of the workings, it was not economical. Several small prospecting efforts have been carried out since.

== Description ==
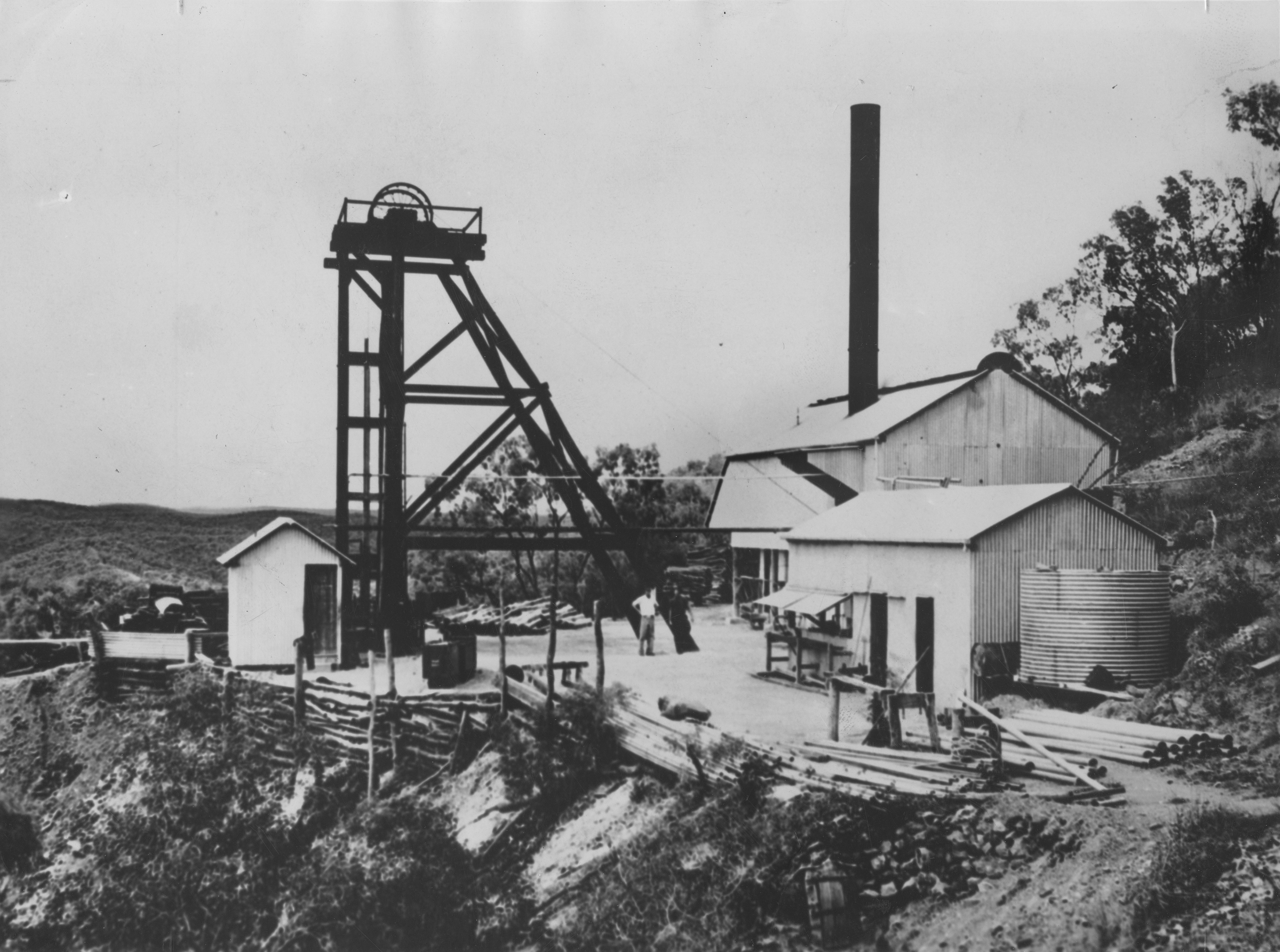
General Grant Mine at Kingsborough, 1937

The place includes a large winding shed, workshop, and two mine shafts situated on a terrace, set high on a steep hillside. Extensive mullock dumps extend from both shafts to the base of the hill. The collar of the main shaft has caved and is strewn with the timbers of a recently collapsed headframe.

The winding shed is constructed of heavy round timber uprights supporting a sawn timber frame. The building and adjacent workshop are corrugated iron clad. The building contains a winding engine, an intact Babcock boiler in a brick mount, a compressor and an air receiver. The Babcock & Wilcox boiler is equipped with a high steel chimney. A second shaft and an adit are located about 70 metres (230 ft) north-west with two colonial boilers.

The surviving plant includes:

- One-cylinder air compressor – R.Schran & Co. Engineers London
- Babcock & Wilcox boiler – no brand
- Two-cylinder steam winding engine – Walkers Limited Queensland No 870 1908
- 2 Colonial boilers (one not in situ)
- Egg-end air receiver.

== Heritage listing ==
General Grant Mine was listed on the Queensland Heritage Register on 21 October 1992 having satisfied the following criteria.

The place is important in demonstrating the evolution or pattern of Queensland's history.

The General Grant Mine is significant in Queensland's history because it was a major producer of reef gold on the Hodgkinson field between 1878 and 1910.

The place demonstrates rare, uncommon or endangered aspects of Queensland's cultural heritage.

In addition, the winding shed is one of two surviving in North Queensland housing an intact range of early winding plant. (The other is located at the Great Northern Mine, Herberton) The Walkers winding engine is one of the most intact examples surveyed, while the Schran air compressor is rare. The Babcock and Wilcox boiler in its brick housing is the only intact example surviving in the Mareeba Mining District.

The place is important in demonstrating the principal characteristics of a particular class of cultural places.

Isolation and difficult access has ensured the survival in situ of this representative and now rare mine haulage plant.
