= Hodgkinson Minerals Area =

Former mining area in Queensland, Australia

The Hodgkinson Mineral Area was a mining area near the Hodgkinson River about 80 km (50 mi) west of Cairns, in the present-day Shire of Mareeba in Queensland, Australia. It was the site of a gold rush in the 1870s.

== History ==
Prospector James Venture Mulligan discovered gold in the Hodgkinson River area in 1876. Mines were established and many towns developed:

- Beaconsfield (16°58′00″S 145°07′00″E)
- Glen Mowbray
- Kingsborough
- Merton
- Northcote
- Tinaroo
- Great Western
- Hodgkinson
- Woodville
- Wellesley
- Union Town
- New Northcote
- Mount Mulligan
- Montmunro
- MacLeodsville
- Littleton
- Kingston
- Stewartown
- Thornborough
- Tyrconnel
- Watsonsville (not to be confused with Watsonville near Herberton)

Many miners relocated from the Palmer River goldfields to the Hodgkinson field. As the Hodgkinson field was too far from the port at Cooktown, a new port was established at Cairns. However, it was a very steep trip up through the Barron Gorge to reach Cairns and so explorer Christy Palmerston successfully searched for an easier track (known as the Bump Track) down the Great Dividing Range to the coast leading to the creation of Port Douglas.

In 1877, two towns - Kingsborough and Thornborough emerged in the area with a substantial population of thousand people residing in each town. Just five kilometres away from each other, the towns developed at a fast pace and were soon home to various hotels, retail stores and shops. Mining operations received a further boost with the inauguration of the Cairns-Mareeba rail line in 1893 which improved accessibility to the area.

As with many gold rushes, after a few years only a few people had made money and the others left, often to another promising new gold rush. There was a brief resurgence of interest during the economic depression of the 1890s as gold became more valuable, but eventually the mining came to an end.

== Present day ==
Most of the towns no longer exist, apart from a few relics. The Tyrconnel Historic Gold Mine can be visited as a tourist attraction.
