= Dimbulah, Queensland =

Dimbulah
- Town
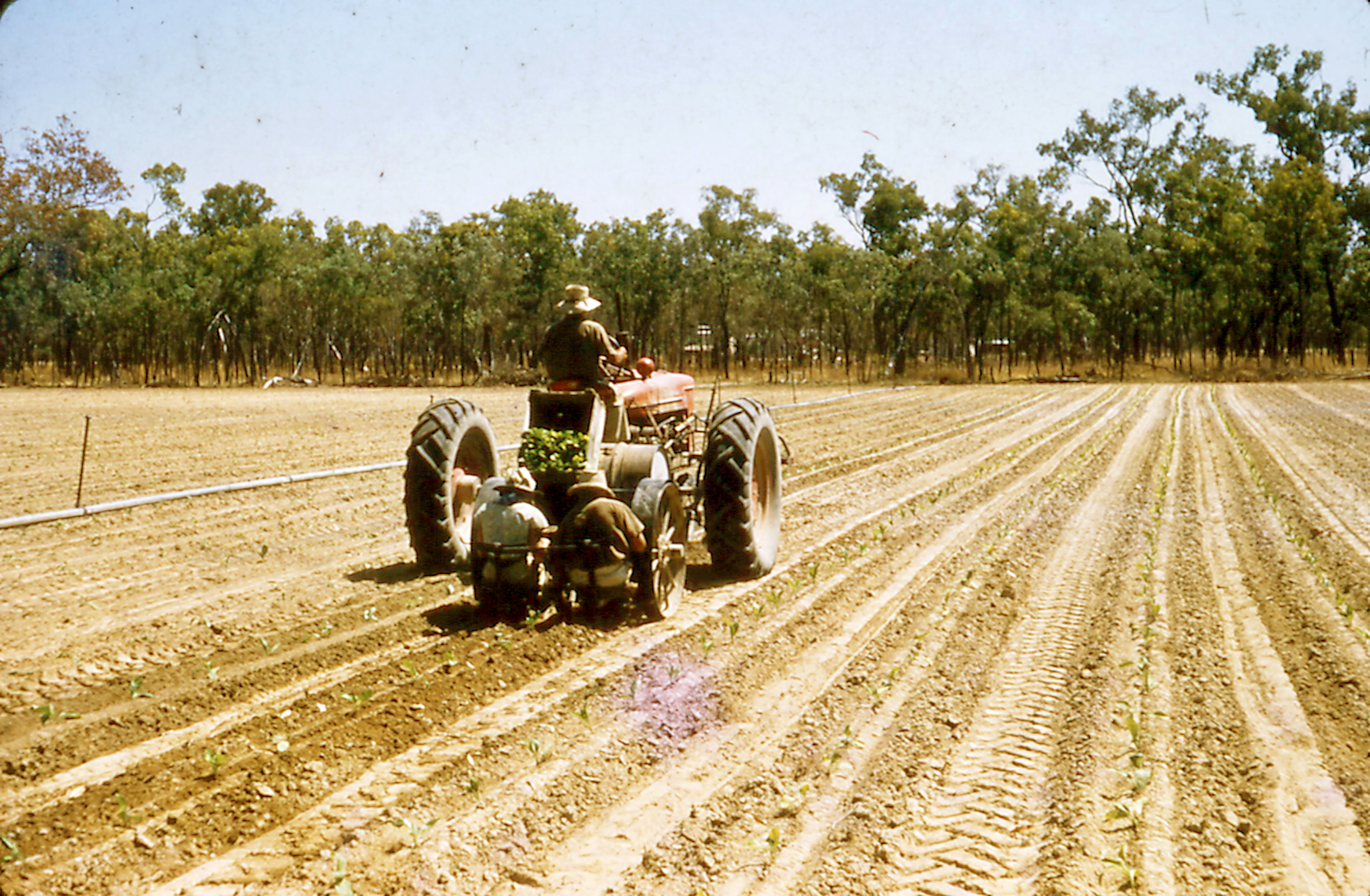
- Farming at Dumbula, circa 1958

- Interactive map of Dimbulah
- Coordinates: 17.1488°S 145.1108°E
- Country: Australia
- State: Queensland
- LGA: Shire of Mareeba
- Location: 46.4 km (28.8 mi) SW of Mareeba; 109 km (68 mi) WSW of Cairns; 415 km (258 mi) NNW of Townsville; 1,764 km (1,096 mi) NNW of Brisbane
- Established: 1876

Government
  - State electorates: Hill; Cook
  - Federal division: Kennedy

Area
  - Total: 703.7 km^{2} (271.7 sq mi)
- Elevation: 407 m (1,335 ft)

Population
  - Total: 975 (2021 census)
  - Density: 1.3855/km^{2} (3.5885/sq mi)
- Time zone: UTC+10:00 (AEST)
- Postcode: 4872
- Mean max temp: 35 °C (95 °F)
- Mean min temp: 10.5 °C (50.9 °F)
- Annual rainfall: 783.2 mm (30.83 in)
Localities around Dimbulah
Chillagoe	Thornborough	Thornborough
Chillagoe	Dimbulah	Mutchilba
Petford	Irvinebank	Irvinebank

Dimbulah is a rural town and locality in Far North Queensland, Australia, 114 kilometres (71 mi) from Cairns by road, on the Atherton Tableland. It is within the local government area of Shire of Mareeba (between 2008 and 2013, it was within the Tablelands Region). In the 2021 census, the locality of Dimbulah had a population of 975 people, a decrease from the 1,050 people in the 2016 census.

The historic mining town of Wolfram is within the locality.

== Geography ==
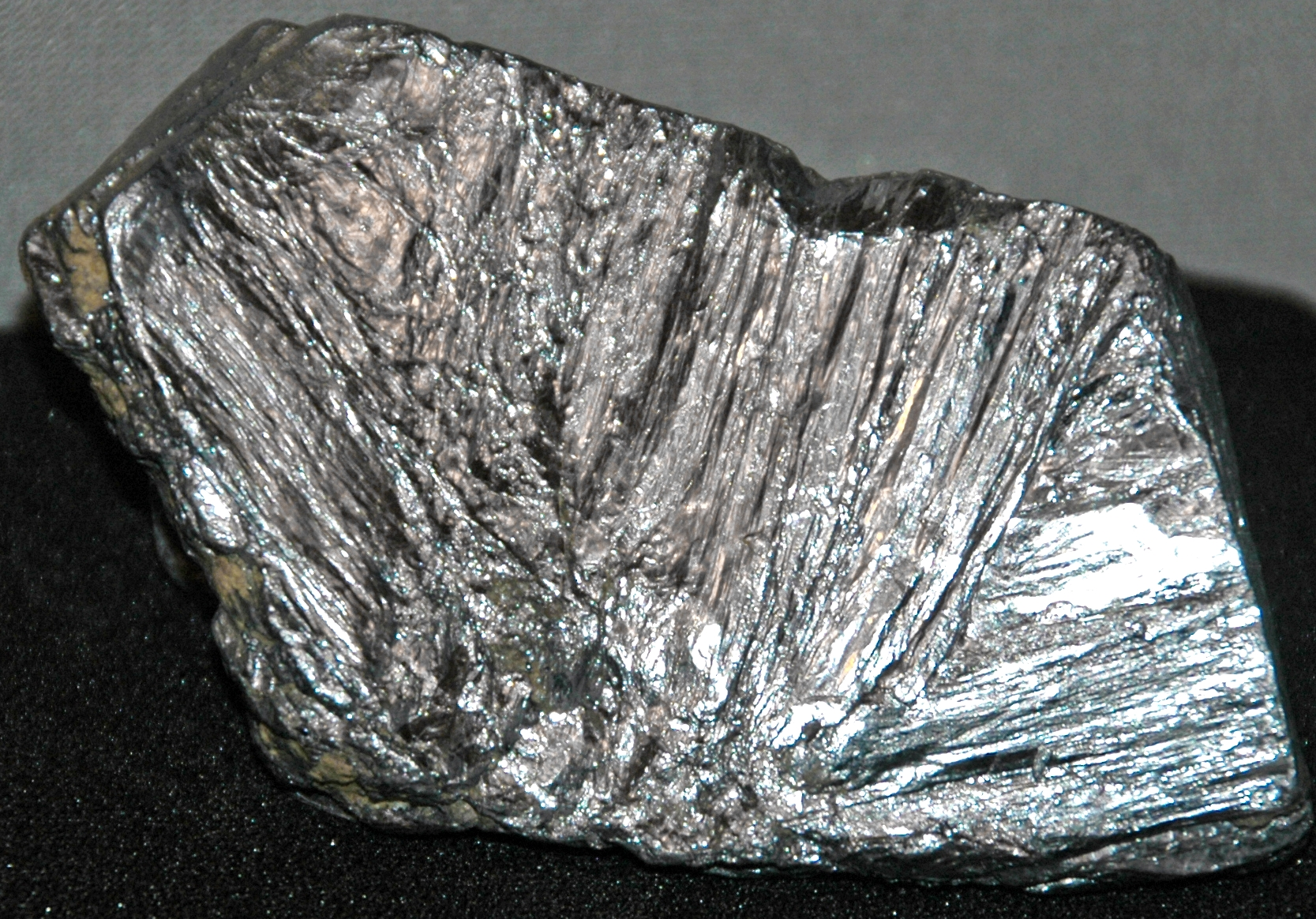
Molybdenite from Wolfram Camp near Dimbulah

Dimbulah is 109 kilometres (68 mi) south-west of Cairns.

The Tablelands railway line passes through the locality which is served by the following railway stations (from north to south):

- Chircan railway station, now abandoned (17.1323°S 145.1331°E)
- Dimbulah railway station (17.1496°S 145.1112°E)
- Leafgold railway station, now abandoned (17.1799°S 145.0720°E)
- Carbonate Creek railway station, now abandoned (17.2016°S 145.0736°E)
- Solanum railway station, now abandoned (17.2207°S 145.0747°E)
- Boonmoo railway station (17.2456°S 145.0734°E)
- Verdure railway station, now abandoned (17.2752°S 145.0017°E)

The main vegetation is low open woodlands consisting mainly of the eucalypts such as bloodwood, box along with melaleucas and a grass cover of kangaroo grass and spear grass.

== History ==
The town was established in 1876 to service the Tyrconnell Gold Mine, one of the richest mines on the Hodgkinson Gold Fields. The name "Dimbulah" is thought to have come from the local Indigenous Australian word for "long waterhole", referring to the Walsh River that runs nearby the town. Dimboola Post Office opened by 1900 and was renamed Dimbulah in 1904.

The area around Dimbulah was originally home to the Djankun and Kuku Djungan tribe.

Wolfram Camp Provisional School opened in 1905. On 1 January 1909, it became Wolfram Camp State School and was renamed that year to be Wolfram State School. It closed in 1930, reopened in 1938 and then closed finally circa 1940.

Boonmoo Provisional School opened circa July 1910 and closed circa April 1912. It was on Boonmoo Road (17.24527°S 145.07642°E).

Dimbulah Provisional School opened on 28 September 1914. On 1 December 1914, it became Dimbulah State School. On 25 January 1965, it was expanded to include a secondary department. The school celebrated its centenary on 27 September 2014.

The Dimbulah parish of the Roman Catholic Diocese of Cairns was established in 1963.

St Anthony's Catholic School opened in January 1966 by the Sisters of St Joseph with an initial enrolment of 64 students. The Sisters operated the school for 22 years, after which it was operated by the Roman Catholic Diocese of Cairns.

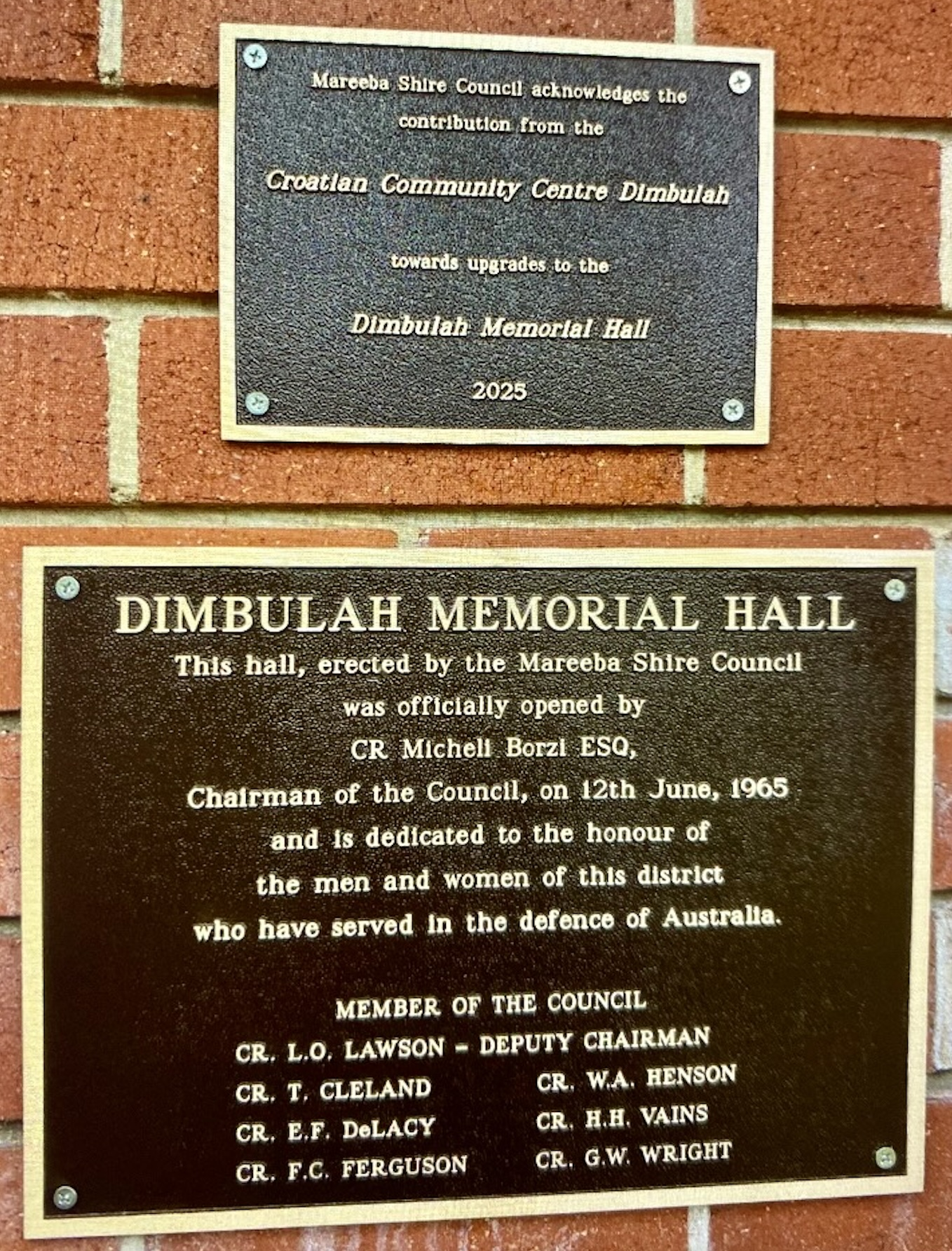
Dimbulah Memorial Hall Upgrades funded by the Croatian Community Centre Dimbulah.

The Dimbulah Public Library opened in 1995 with a minor refurbishment in 2013.

== Demographics ==
In the 2011 census, the locality of Dimbulah had a population of 1,414 people.

In the 2016 census, the locality of Dimbulah had a population of 1,050 people.

In the 2021 census, the locality of Dimbulah had a population of 975 people.

== Heritage listings ==
Dimbulah has a number of sites listed on the Queensland Heritage Register including:

- La Société Française des Métaux Rares treatment plant, Main Street, Wolfram
- Thermo Electric Ore Reduction Corporation Mill, Wolfram Road, Wolfram

== Economy ==
Tobacco remained the dominant crop until the early-2000's when government policy compelled its demise, with de-regulation of the industry in 1995 being the leading cause.

A ban on the cultivation of tobacco came into effect in 2004 with the last legal sale of tobacco occurring at the Mareeba Tobacco Sales floor on February 20, 2004 by Dimbulah tobacco grower Glen Cagnola.

The Mareeba Tobacco Leaf Marketing Board building can still be seen on Byrnes Street, Mareeba at the current Westpac Bank location.

Recent attempts at alternative crops such as tea trees, mangoes, sugar cane, coffee, lemons, limes, avocados, papaws, papayas, peanuts, soya beans, lychees, grapes and cash crops (pumpkins, melons, etc.) have met with mixed success.

== Education ==
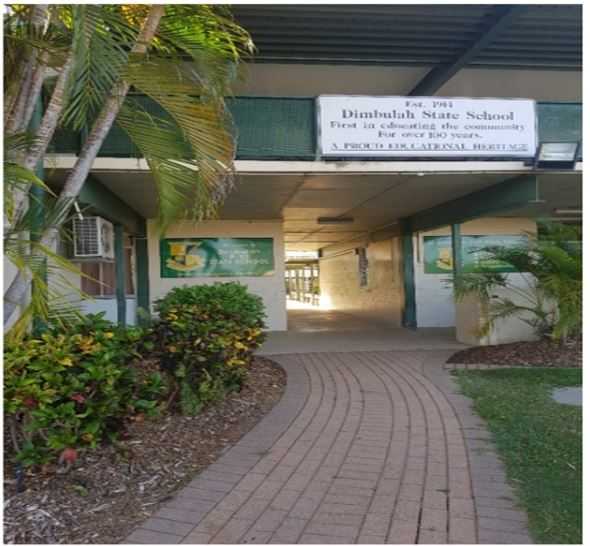
Dimbulah State School

Dimbulah State School is a government primary and secondary (Prep–10) school for boys and girls at 48–50 Kennedy Street (17.1489°S 145.1131°E). In 2018, the school had an enrolment of 150 students with 17 teachers (14 full-time equivalent) and 13 non-teaching staff (9 full-time equivalent).

St Anthony's School is a Catholic primary (Prep–6) school for boys and girls at 3 Hyde Street (17.1473°S 145.1118°E). In 2018, the school had an enrolment of 37 students with 8 teachers (5 full-time equivalent) and 10 non-teaching staff (4 full-time equivalent).

There are no schools offering education to Year 12 in Dimbulah. The nearest government secondary school with education to Year 12 is Mareeba State High School in Mareeba to the north-east. However, it would be too distant from some parts of Dimbulah and distance education and boarding schools would be other options.

== Amenities ==
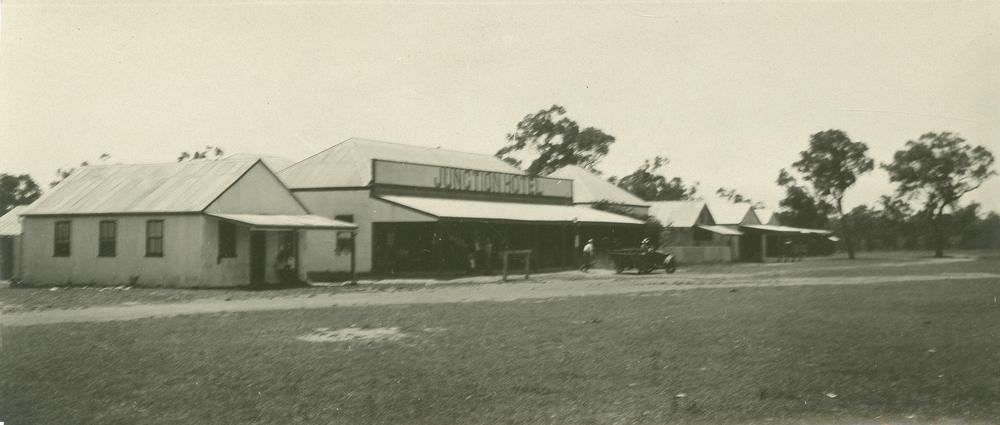
Junction Hotel, Dimbulah, circa 1930 (still operating 2017)

The Mareeba Shire operates a public library at Shire Hall at the corner of Raleigh Street and Burke Development Road.

The Dimbulah branch of the Queensland Country Women's Association meets at the QCWA Hall at 22 Brickley Street.

St Anthony's Catholic Church is in Raleigh Street. It is within the Dimbulah Parish of the Roman Catholic Diocese of Cairns which is administered from the Atherton parish.

== Events ==
St Anthony's Catholic Church celebrates the Feast Day of St Anthony of Padua on the 3rd Sunday of June with a special mass, followed by a procession, barbeque and pesca (a lucky dip which takes its name from the Italian pesca miracolosa, the miraculous catch of fish).

== Notable people ==
- The Hon. Keith De Lacy AM, former Treasurer of Queensland
- Chris Sheppard, former NRL player
- William Yang, photographer and actor
